= Marble Arch Caves Global Geopark =

Lies on the Fermanagh-Cavan border, Ireland

Coordinates: 54°15′30.34″N 7°48′51.53″W

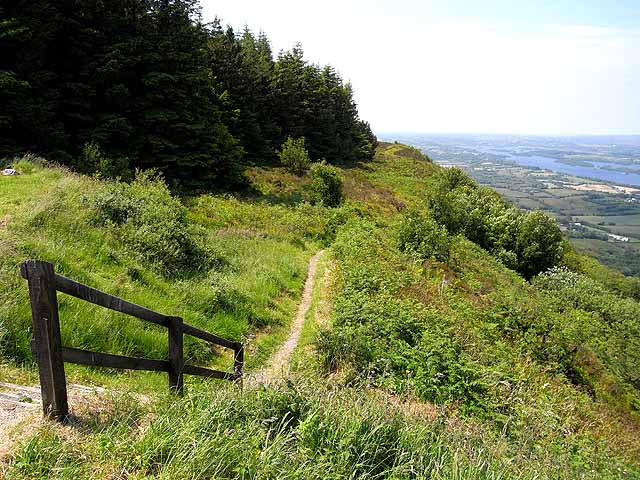
Clifftop pathway at the Cliffs of Magho, above Lower Lough Erne.

The Cuilcagh Lakelands Geopark formerly known as the Marble Arch Caves Global Geopark straddles the border between Northern Ireland and the Republic of Ireland. It is centred on the Marble Arch Caves and in 2001 it became one of the first geoparks to be designated in Europe.

The Geopark features various sites which demonstrate the geological and wider natural heritage of the area, as well as the cultural heritage relating to 7,000–8,000 years of recorded human occupation since the last ice age. It is jointly managed by Fermanagh and Omagh District Council and Cavan County Council.

== Geography ==
The Geopark consists of over 30 discrete areas of land, largely in public ownership across County Fermanagh and neighbouring parts of County Cavan between Pettigo and Belleek in the north and west and the town of Cavan in the southeast. Most extensive of these are the Cuilcagh Mountain Park, along with the forests of Ballintempo, Belmore, Tullychurry, Lough Navar, Conagher and Big Dog, each of which are managed by the Forest Service Northern Ireland.

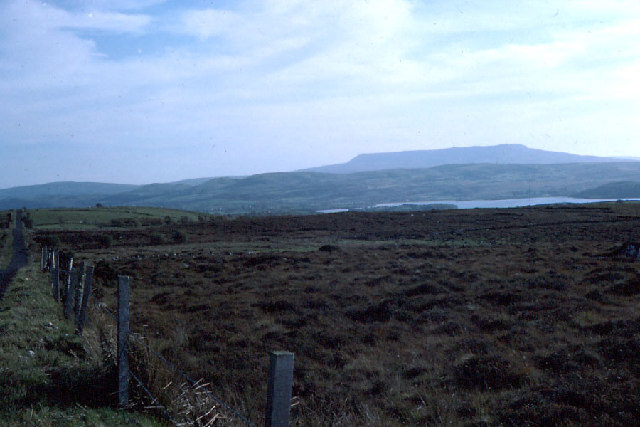
Cuilcagh Mountain, with Upper Lough Macnean in the foreground.

A number of national nature reserves and other natural and historic sites and viewpoints also fall within the designated area, the distribution of which has been likened to an archipelago. There are particular concentrations of geopark sites around both Lower Lough Erne and south of Belcoo.

The Breifne Mountains straddle the border between Northern Ireland and the Republic of Ireland, a few miles southwest of Enniskillen. Cuilcagh itself attains a height of 666 metres (2,185 ft). The Sruh Croppa, Owenbrean and Aghinrawn rivers flowing on the northern flanks of Cuilcagh Mountain sink underground on reaching the limestone outcrop, combining underground to form the Cladagh River which emerges at a natural rock bridge known as the Marble Arch.

Much of the rest of the Geopark comprises parts of the range of hills stretching between Belmore Mountain, which peaks at 401 metres (1,316 ft), and the Cliffs of Magho overlooking the western reaches of Lower Lough Erne.

== Geology ==
The Geopark is almost wholly formed in sedimentary bedrock dating from the Carboniferous Period. These are a suite of faulted and gently folded sandstones, mudstones and limestones assigned to the Visean and Namurian stages of the period. There are however a few areas where older rocks are to be found. The larger part of the Geopark is covered by thick glacial deposits which obscure the bedrock geology across much of the lower ground.

=== Pre-Carboniferous strata ===
The oldest rocks within the Geopark are quartzo-feldspathic gneisses found to the northwest of Lower Lough Erne. They originated as marine sandstones and were metamorphosed during the Caledonian Orogeny. Further east around Tappaghan Mountain and Lack are a suite of schists, phyllites and marble ascribed to the Dalradian Supergroup.

Greywackes, shales, sandstones and conglomerates of Ordovician age are found around the margins of the southern extent of the Geopark at Cavan and Butlers Bridge and between Lismoren and Killashandra. This outcrop is intruded by the Crossdoney granite emplaced during the Silurian period. Also of Silurian age is a small outcrop of turbidites at Lisbellaw. An area around Lisnarick and Irvinestown is underlain by Old Red Sandstone; these early Devonian age sandstones, mudstones and siltstones extend to the shores of Lower Lough Erne though, as elsewhere across the lower lying ground of the area, are largely obscured by much younger superficial deposits.

=== Carboniferous strata ===
The Carboniferous strata consists of numerous recognised formations which are assembled into an underlying (older) Tyrone Group and an overlying (therefore younger) Leitrim Group. The Marble Arch Caves are developed in the Asbian-age Glencar Limestone Formation and the Knockmore Limestone Member of the overlying Dartry Limestone Formation. Cuilcagh Mountain and the hills to its northwest are largely made up of rocks of the Asbian/Brigantian age Glenade Sandstone Formation, the Brigantian/Pendleian-age Dergvone and Carraun Shale Formations, the Pendleian-age Briscloonagh Sandstone Formation and the Arnsbergian-age Bencroy Shale, Lackagh Sandstone and Gowlaun Shale Formations.

=== Palaeogene intrusions ===
Many of these formations are heavily faulted. Those at Cuilcagh are intruded by the WNW–SSE-oriented Cuilcagh Dyke – one of several Palaeogene age vertical intrusions of dolerite in the area whilst a dolerite sill intrudes into the area to the west of Conagher Forest.

=== Quaternary ===
The limestone formations have given rise to Northern Ireland's finest karst landscape. The caves themselves are of unknown age but date back in part over 380,000 years.

The area was subject to repeated glaciation during the Quaternary period. The most recent ice age, the Midlandian or Devensian, has left a spread of glacial erratics across the landscape. Erratics at Cavan Burren Park feature in an interpretive trail at this locality. The larger part of the Geopark is covered by a huge swarm of drumlins, the alignment of which reflect the passage of ice broadly from east to west though in a southerly direction south of Upper Lough Erne. They formed under an icesheet in excess of 1000m thick at the height of the ice age. The distinctive landscape of Upper Lough Erne and the southern stretch of Lower Lough Erne results from the partial drowning of numerous drumlins in the post-glacial period.

== Protected areas ==
There are several national nature reserves within the Geopark, including those of Correl Glen, Hanging Rock, Cladagh Glen and Killykeegan. Some of the blanket bog on Cuilcagh Mountain is protected as a Special Area of Conservation (SAC) under the European Union's Habitats Directive and as a Ramsar site designated under the Ramsar Convention.

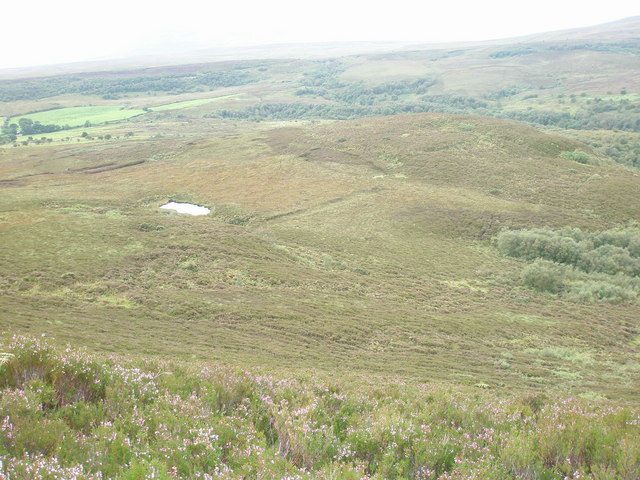
Blanket bog near Florencecourt, on the foothills of Cuilcagh mountain.

== Principal attractions ==
- Marble Arch Caves are a major draw for visitors in Northern Ireland and these show caves exhibit a wide range of classic cave features which are enjoyed by visitors by boat and on foot.
- The Cavan Burren Park is an area of forestry land near Blacklion in County Cavan, which contains a wealth of prehistoric monuments linked by trails, with a visitors' centre providing interpretation of the features. These include the Calf House or Druid's Altar, a fine example of a portal tomb or dolmen dating from Neolithic times, and the nearby Giant's Leap wedge tomb.
- Shannon Pot is a natural feature which is considered to be the source of Ireland's longest river, the Shannon. It has rich mythological associations, not least the story of Sionnan, granddaughter of the Celtic sea-god Lir, who came to this spot in search of the great Salmon of Wisdom.
- There are a number of castles and historic buildings in the Geopark, now largely in ruins. These include Castle Caldwell, Tully Castle, Monea Castle, Drumlane Abbey and Enniskillen Castle, of which the latter is refurbished and contains a museum.
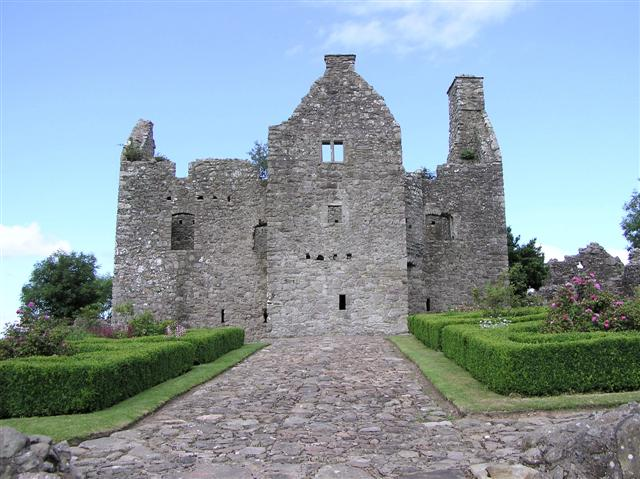
  Tully Castle in 2006.
- Devenish Island is a registered ancient monastic site in Lower Lough Erne which is accessible by boat.
- Boa Island is on situated off the northern shore of Lower Lough Erne and is accessible by road. It contains important scheduled monuments related to early Christianity.

== History ==
The Marble Arch Caves were first explored in 1895 by the French speleologist Édouard-Alfred Martel together with naturalist Lyster Jameson. During the following 70 years, members of the Yorkshire Ramblers' Club and other speleological organisations made further explorations of the system. Fermanagh District Council began to consider developing a show cave at the site and they eventually opened them to the public in 1985. The nearby Cuilcagh Mountain Park was opened in 1998.

The two areas became one of the first European geoparks in 2001 and gained the status of global geopark in 2004 following the Madonie Agreement between UNESCO and the European Geoparks Network. In 2007 the geopark was extended to cover many thousands of hectares of afforested upland to the north west of Cuilcagh Mountain, and in September 2008 it became the world's first transnational geopark in the European and Global Geoparks Networks as it was extended across the international border into County Cavan in the Republic of Ireland.

== Events ==
The Geopark promotes walks and events of various sorts to interpret its attractions both to local people and visitors. These include a celebration of European Geoparks Week which takes place at the end of May – start of June, coinciding with similar events in geoparks across Europe.

== See also ==
- Castle Archdale
- Cladagh Glen Nature Reserve
- Cliffs of Magho
- Hanging Rock Nature Reserve
- Lough Oughter
