= Caves of the Tullybrack and Belmore hills =

Series of caves in Northern Ireland

Coordinates: 54.37736°N 7.85934°W

The Caves of the Tullybrack and Belmore hills are a collection of caves in southwest County Fermanagh, Northern Ireland. The region is also described as the West Fermanagh Scarplands by environmental agencies and shares many similar karst features with the nearby Marble Arch Caves Global Geopark.

The caves are situated under the hills of Tullybrack (386 m (1,266 ft)) – which incorporates Glenkeel (373 m (1,224 ft)) and Knockmore (280 m (920 ft)) – and Belmore (398 m (1,306 ft)), and feature three major cave systems: Reyfad–Glenkeel, Noon's Hole–Arch Cave and Boho Caves. They have been described as nationally significant by the Northern Ireland Environment Agency.

The caves and related features are formed predominantly in the Dartry Limestone Formation – a sequence of rocks assigned to the Asbian sub-stage of the Visean stage of the Carboniferous period. Within this formation, the Knockmore Limestone Member is also an important cave-forming rock sequence. Cave development occurred within the Quaternary period and certain features are ascribed to the Holocene epoch of the last 10,000 years.

With the exception of Arch Cave, all of the caves and related karstic features listed below have been designated as provisional Areas of Special Scientific Interest (provisional ASSIs, or PASSIs), a conservation designation in Northern Ireland equivalent to SSSIs in other parts of the United Kingdom.

== Belmore Mountain ==
=== Boho Caves ===
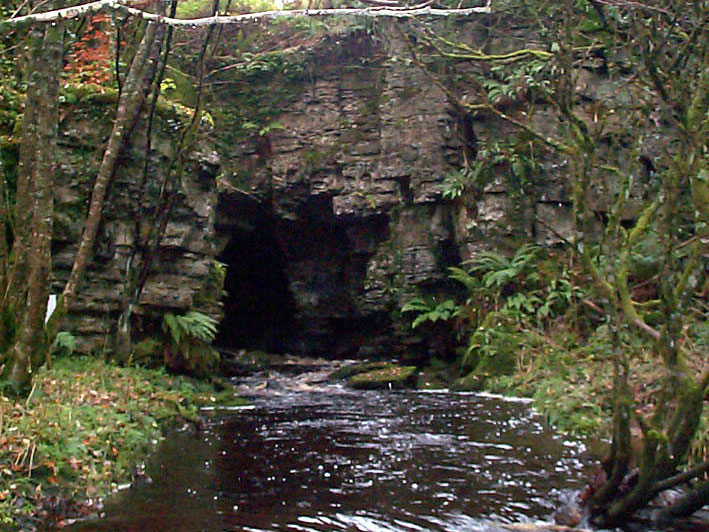
Quarry Entrance of Boho Cave, in flood.

Grid Ref: H12684431. The Boho Caves are a selection of caves encompassing the main Boho Cave, the smaller Waterfall Cave and Upper and Lower Ravine Caves. The Boho Cave system is the sixth-longest cave system in Northern Ireland and is the only example of joint-controlled caves in Northern Ireland.

=== Aghnaglack Cave ===
Grid ref: H108436. This small cave is part of the Boho Cave system and has been designated a Provisional Area of Special Scientific Interest (PASSI) site. The substrata dates from the Holocene epoch of the Quaternary period and is composed of limestone. There are two passages in this cave estimated to be about 8 m (26 ft) long, one of which has been enlarged as a souterrain and is also a scheduled ancient monument.

=== Aghnaglack Rising ===
Grid ref: H10884343. This cave is also part of the Boho Cave system and has been designated a PASSI. The substrata date from the Holocene and are composed of limestone. This formation can be crawled through in dry conditions.

=== Pollnagollum, Coolarkan ===
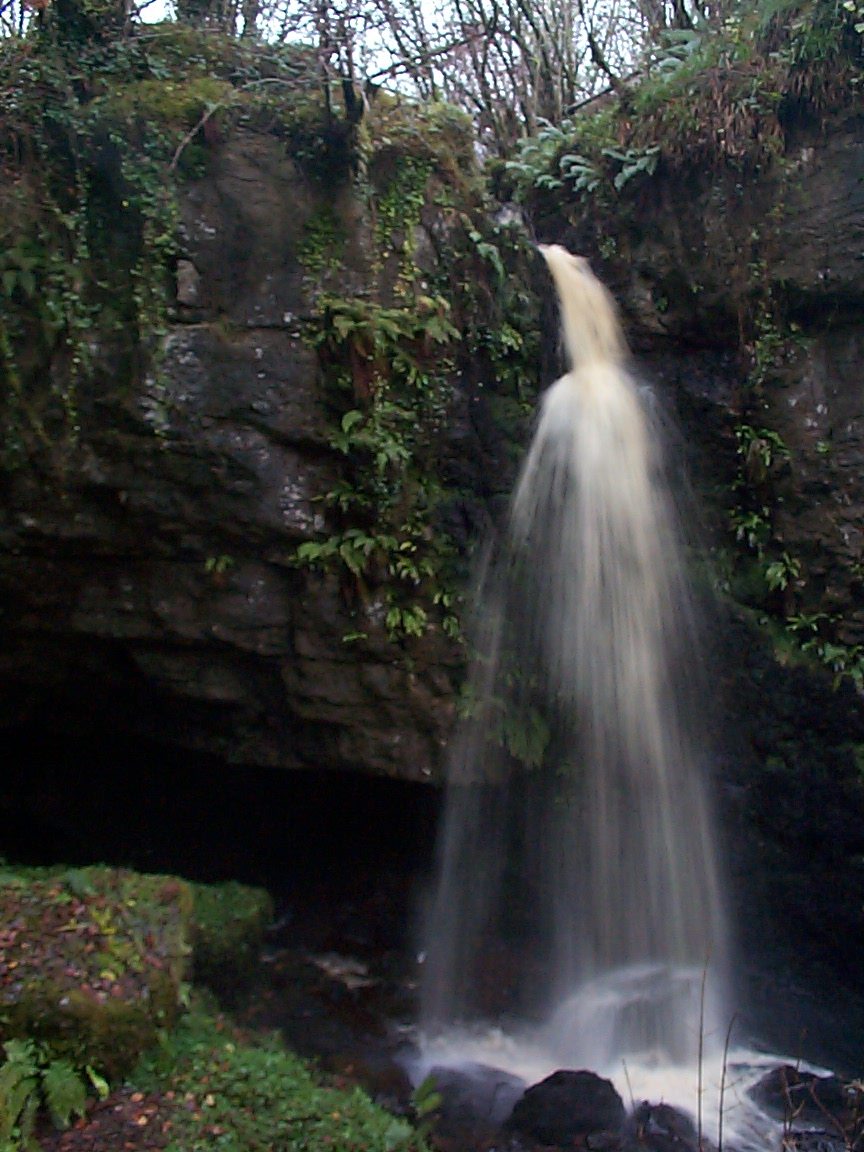
Water cascades beside and flows into Pollnagollum Coolarkan

Grid ref: H12214311. (Irish: Poll na gColm, meaning 'hole of the doves'). This site is designated as a PASSI. The rocks comprise Dartry Limestone, chert, and some calcite formations. The cave can be entered by a previously collapsed roof structure through which a large waterfall flows. The stream runs through the cave until it comes to a boulder choke which has so far proved to be impenetrable. The stream resurfaces onto the valley floor of the Aghanaglack River 1.8 km to the west north west.

Early speleological visits to the cave include that of Henry Lyster Jameson in 1895, primarily to collect specimens of fauna.

== Tullybrack ==
The second karst system in the Boho area is known as the Reyfad–Carrickbeg system, containing a number of very impressive features. The Northern Ireland Environmental Agency describe this system as follows: "the quality of geomorphological and geological features in the Reyfad–Pollnacrom–Polltullybrack cave system make it arguably the most important underground karst site in Northern Ireland."

=== Carrickbeg Rising Cave (Bunty Pot) ===
Grid ref: H11724670. The rocks here date from the Quaternary, Carboniferous period and are designated PASSI. This cave is approximately 1 km long in a north–south direction and is divided into two parts. The main body of water flowing through the cave is traversable, but there is a 10 m flooded sump which emerges in another section known as the Farr Out Series.

Carrickbeg Rising is the proven resurgence of four major stream sinks within the system: Pollnacrom, Polltullybrack, Waterfall Sink and Watson's Sink.

=== Fairy Cave ===
Grid ref: H09254750. The passages here date from the Holocene. The area has been designated a PASSI. Fairy Cave has been speculated to be part of a previous series of passages of the main Reyfad system. There is a small passage that runs along the joints of the bedrock and is only 1 m in height, which terminates in a sump; beyond this is a silt-choked hole.

=== Ivy Hole ===
Grid ref: H10694635. The rocks of this sinkhole are of Knockmore Limestone. The hole is designated a PASSI and is one of a pair of dolines. A small stream flows into the sinkhole, which is estimated to be 10 m deep. It has been determined that the water from this hole emerges at Carrickbeg Rising.

=== Little Reyfad ===
Grid ref: H096465. The rocks of this sinkhole consist of Dartry Limestone, Knockmore Limestone and chert. The site has been designated a PASSI. Little Reyfad is at the base of a shakehole. A series of descents (7 m) leads to a floor of broken chert, followed by a further 3 metre difficult descent to another base, which is blocked with a rock and gravel.

=== Mad Pot ===
Grid ref: H09444666. The rocks of this sinkhole are composed of Dartry Limestone and Knockmore Limestone with inclusions of chert. The sinkhole originates in peat and then cuts into limestone rock. There are a series of chert base levels which have been broken up to give access to further passages. When the substrata changes into Knockmore Limestone, the character of the cave changes to a more vertically oriented passage. After some more climbing there is a 22 m vertical drop with a further crawl at the base, which leads to a completely flooded section or sump, which itself is completely blocked up with silt. Above this is a very high roofed chamber or aven.

=== Murphy's Hole ===
Grid ref: H10054613. The rocks of this formation date from the Quaternary (Holocene) period and consist of limestone. The area is designated a PASSI.

Murphy's Hole is situated at the north end of a depression that also contains Seltanacool Sinks. A waterfall drains into the sink, which takes a large volume of water in heavy rains. Water draining here has been dye traced to the resurgence at Carrickbeg.

=== Oweyglass Caves ===
Grid ref: H100470. The substrata from this formation dates from the Quaternary (Holocene) era and is composed of limestone. Designated a PASSI, it is situated in a cliff of Knockmore Limestone.

This cave is linked to a series of springs. The longest passage here is reported to be no more than 15 m (49 ft).

=== Pollbeg ===
Grid ref: H11744557. The rocks from this sinkhole are of Carn and Dartry Limestones. The site is designated a PASSI. This hole floods in wet weather.

=== Pollkeeran ===
Grid ref: H11834513. Also known as Pollkerran, this sinkhole is designated a PASSI. The strata consist of Carn Limestone with mudstone and shale deposits. This formation is thought to have been a cave roof, which has collapsed, normally known as a shakehole. The debris from the collapse has formed what is known as a 'choke hole'. Investigations have determined that the stream which sinks into Pollkeeran rises again 2 km to the north at Carrickbeg Rising Cave.

Extreme caution is advised as this sink is extremely dangerous and attempts to explore should only be undertaken by very experienced cavers.

=== Pollmore (Poll Mór) ===
Grid ref: H11654582. The rocks from this shakehole are of Carn Limestone. The shakehole contains two sinks and is surrounded by cliffs on three sides. In wet weather, the sinks flood and water up to 2 m deep can build up. It has been ascertained that the water from Pollmore emerges at Carrickbeg Rising.

=== Pollnacrom ===
Grid ref: H08534702. The rocks from this formation are composed of Dartry and Knockmore Limestones with chert and gypsum. This site has been designated a PASSI.

This cave is part of the main Reyfad system that links to the 'Heaven and Hell' passage. It has a small, wet entrance. The cave contains two shafts at 50 and 15 m respectively, which permit entry to the main stream passage which trends in a north-west direction for 100 m (330 ft) before turning south. The cave has been explored for 600 m (2,000 ft) to an impassable sump. An attempt to force through this route in 1981 led to the death of a diver.

Access is by permission of landowner only.

=== Polltullybrack ===
Grid ref: H09214672. (Irish: Poll Tulaigh Breac, meaning 'hole of the speckled hillside'). The rocks in this second major entrance to the Reyfad system are composed of Dartry and Knockmore Limestones with chert and calcite formations. This cave is designated a PASSI.

There is a very tight entrance to this cave through a sinkhole in what is known as a dry valley, but this eventually expands into a wider cave. The continuation of the passage contains many boulders and a deep pool, followed by 250 m of difficult passage which ends in a submerged section, through which cavers have to duck. A short distance beyond this there is a 53-metre shaft, which is the longest-known pitch of any Irish cave. The cave joins up with the Reyfad system just north of the main chamber. Just before this are chambers known as the 'Grottoes', which contain fine examples of calcite features including stalactites, helictites and cave curtains.

Access is by permission of landowner only.

=== Rattle Hole ===
Grid ref: H10234633. The rocks from this pothole are limestone with some gravel. The site, located in moorland, has been designated a PASSI.

Rattle Hole consists of a single shaft of 36 m (118 ft) depth, which terminates in a boulder strewn base. This provides access to a second chamber, which is a further 25 m (82 ft) deep and ends in a gravel base. Further efforts at extending this passage have proved fruitless, but as a result of dye testing it is known that the water from here emerges at Carrickbeg.

=== Reyfad Pot (Pota Raith Fada) ===
Grid ref: H08894687. The rocks from this formation comprise Carn and Dartry Limestones with some Glenade Sandstone. Breccia, chert, calcite and gypsum deposits can also be found.

This cave is noted by the Northern Ireland Environment Agency as being the most important underground karst site in Northern Ireland. At 193 metres (633 ft) deep and 6.7 kilometres (4.2 mi) long, it is the deepest cave system in Ireland and the second-longest in Northern Ireland. This site is a PASSI and is a very active cave with many calcite formations and fossiliferous limestone, which includes evidence of Brachiopods and Crinoids. The extended area is hypothesised to have formed from the last glacial period (Pleistocene).

Access is by permission of landowner only.

=== Seltanacool Sinks ===
Grid ref: H102458. (Irish: Séilteán a Cúil, meaning 'rear rocky range'). The rocks from this line of three sinks date from the Quaternary (Holocene) and consist of limestone. It is thought that the sinks, which are situated in the same depression as Murphy's Hole, link to Carrickbeg Rising.

== Knockmore ==
=== Arch Cave ===
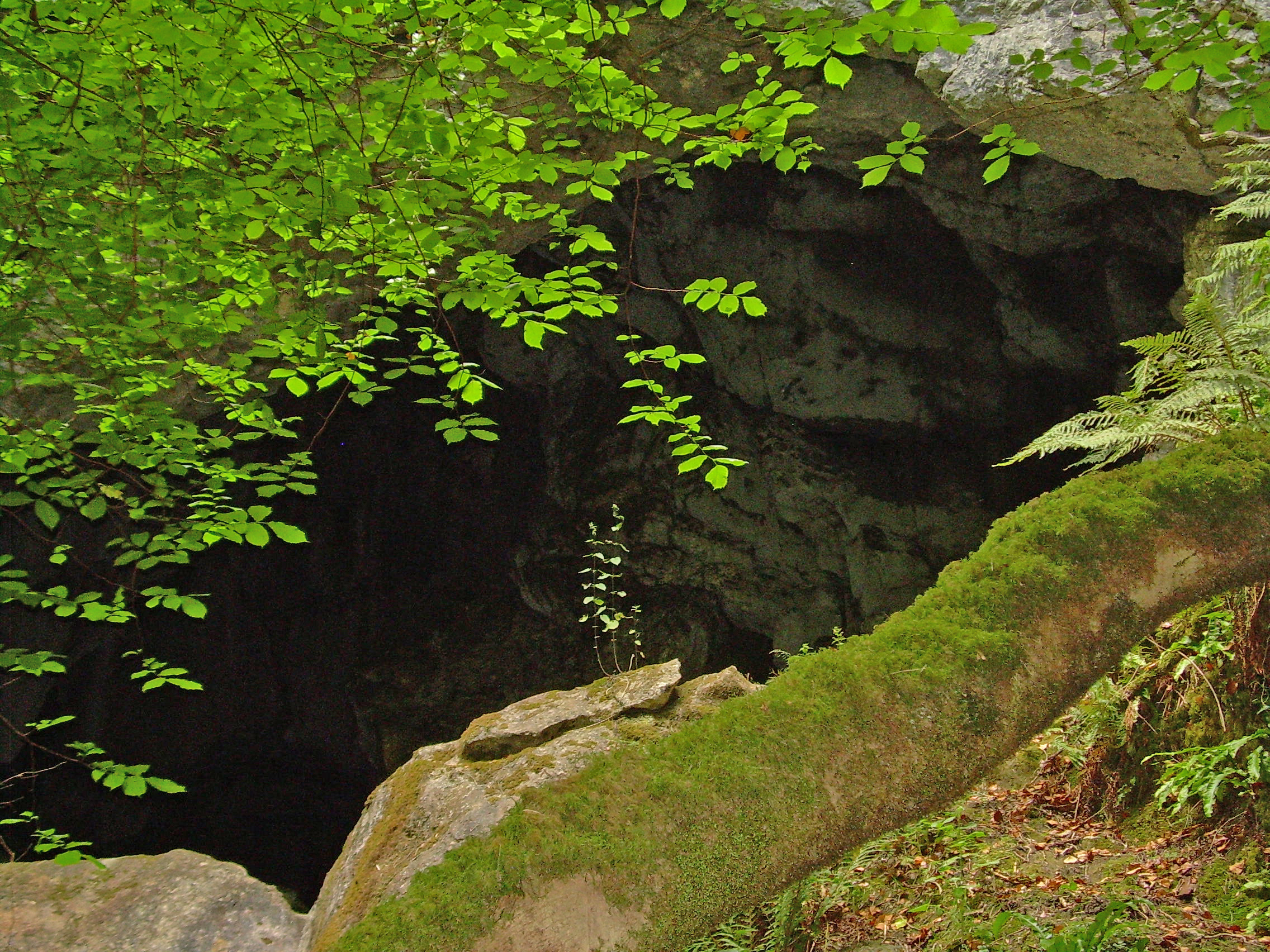
Arch Cave, June 2009, The Baraghan, Boho

Grid ref: H1037 4790. This cave is also known as Ooghboraghan. The rocks comprise Dartry Limestone, Glenade Sandstone, Glencar Limestone, Knockmore Limestone, Meenymore Formation. These are found together with breccia, chert, limestone, mudstone and calcite.

=== Aughakeeran Pot ===
Grid ref: H09344765. Also known as Pollaphylla or Pollasod, the rocks of this pothole comprise Dartry and Knockmore Limestones. The site is designated a PASSI.

This sinkhole contains a substantial shaft of 30 m (98 ft) depth, with some crawling sections and short passages which ultimately end at an impenetrable crack in the rocks. The stream passing through Aughakeeran is believed to join the drainage through Pollanaffrin.

=== Crunthelagh Sink ===
Grid ref: H09374793. The rocks from this sinkhole comprise Dartry and Knockmore Limestones. The formation is designated a PASSI. The water flowing into this sink is thought to emerge into 'High Noon's' in the Noon's–Arch system.

=== Killydrum Sink ===
Grid ref: H09954771.

=== Lettered Cave (Inscribed Cave) ===
Grid ref H08845047. Situated 50 m from Knockmore summit, this is a small cave of mainly archaeological significance, and is partially man-made. The rocks in which it is formed is Knockmore Limestone.

The cave is named for the art and writing of varying age inscribed on the walls. It was investigated by William Wakeman (1866–70) and Thomas Plunkett (1878 and 1898) and is now a scheduled ancient monument. The cave, described in the paper by Wakeman in 1868 as lying 'in the midst of a desolate, heath-clad highland, which extends over a considerable portion of northern Fermanagh, with no trace of cultivation, ancient or modern" . He also describes it as situated beside a lake four miles and a quarter to the west and north of the police station of Bohoe (Boho).

=== Old Barr Sink ===
Grid ref H09244844. The rocks from this formation comprise Dartry Limestone and Knockmore Limestone. The feature is designated as a PASSI.

This sink is found in a forested area containing a small stream, which sinks in several places. The water from the stream is believed to enter 'Inlet 1' beside 'Artie's Chamber' in the Noon's–Arch system.

=== Pollanaffrin ===
Grid ref: H09354754. The rocks from this sinkhole comprise Dartry Limestone and Knockmore Limestone. The area is designated a PASSI.

A large river enters this pot hole when there is much rain. The cave follows many twists and drops and is of considerable length before it terminates at an impasse. It has been speculated that the water from this system enters Noon's Hole.

=== Seltanahunny Sink ===
Grid ref: H08964860. This sink forms part of the Noon's Hole–Arch Cave complex and the rock in which it is formed comprises Dartry Limestone and Knockmore Limestone. The site, which is designated a PASSI, features a narrow bedding plane leading for 12 m to a waterfall and a duck. It has been speculated that the water from this sink also joins the Noon's Hole drainage system.

== Notes and references ==
=== References ===
- Jones, Gareth Ll.; Burns, Gaby; Fogg, Tim; Kelly, John (1997). The Caves of Fermanagh and Cavan (2nd Ed.). Lough Nilly Press. ISBN 0-9531602-0-3.
