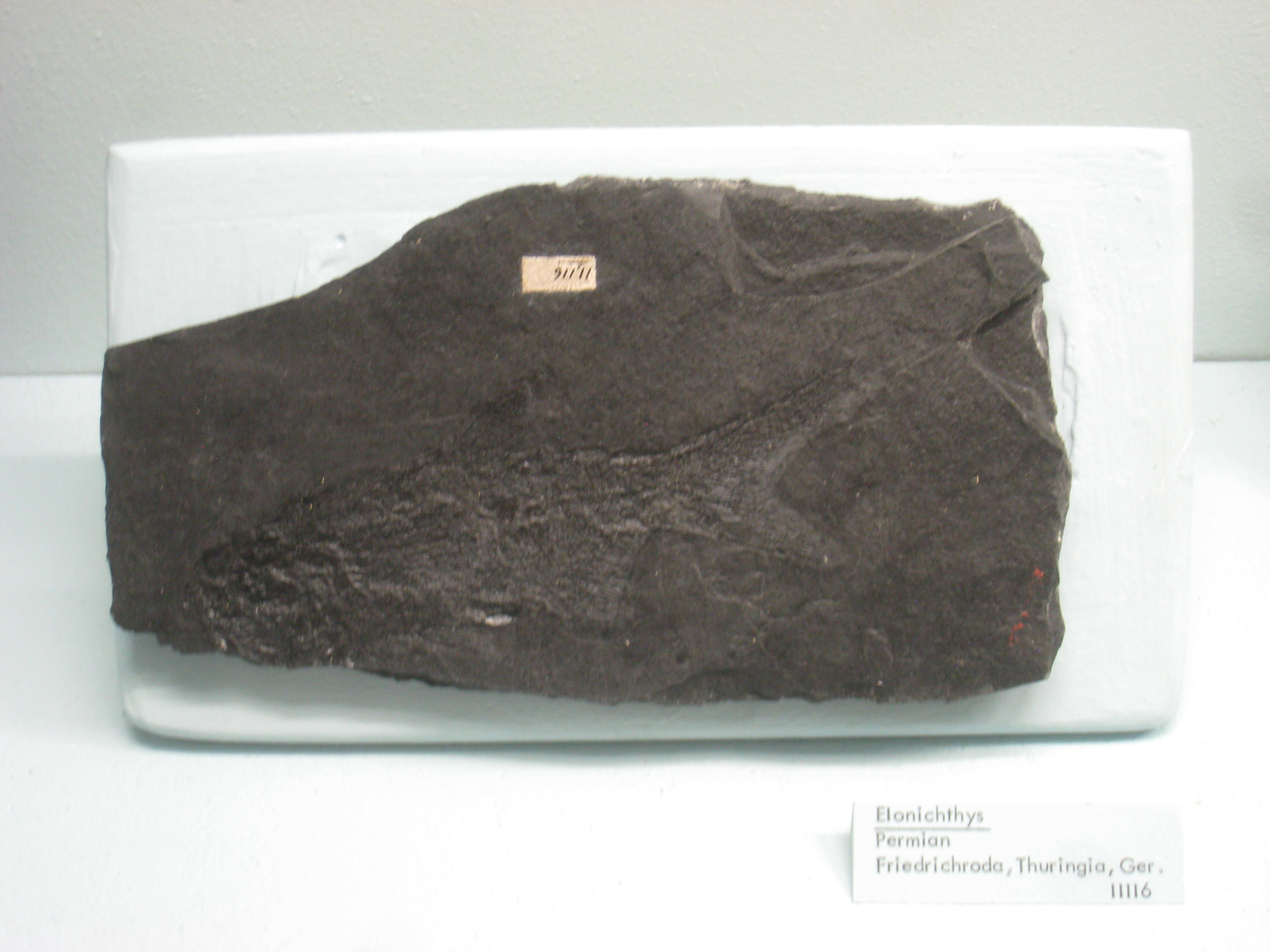
- Fossil of Elonichthys sp. from the Permian of Germany

Scientific classification
- Kingdom: Animalia
- Phylum: Chordata
- Class: Actinopterygii
- Order: †Elonichthyiformes
- Family: †Elonichthyidae
- Genus: †Elonichthys; Giebel, 1848

Type species
- †Elonichthys germari Giebel, 1848

Species
- †E. germari Giebel, 1848; †E. fritschi Friedrich, 1878; †E. krejcii (Fritsch, 1895)

= Elonichthys =

Elonichthys Temporal range: Late Pennsylvanian–early Asselian

Extinct genus of fishes

Elonichthys is an extinct genus of prehistoric freshwater ray-finned fish known from the late Paleozoic. The genus sensu stricto contains three species known from the latest Carboniferous to the earliest Permian of freshwater ecosystems of Europe, but as a former wastebasket taxon, it contains many more dubiously-classified species from the Carboniferous and Permian of Europe, Greenland, South Africa, and North America.

== Species ==
The following are species within Elonichthys sensu stricto:

- †E. germari Giebel, 1848 (type species) - Late Carboniferous (Gzhelian) of Germany (Siebigerode Formation)
- †E. fritschi Friedrich, 1878 - Early Permian (Asselian) of Germany (Meisenheim Formation)
- †E. krejcii (Fritsch, 1895) - Gzhelian of the Czech Republic (Slaný Formation)

=== Former species ===
The following are more dubious species that were formerly classified into this genus. However, the majority have been found to no longer even be members of Elonichthyidae.

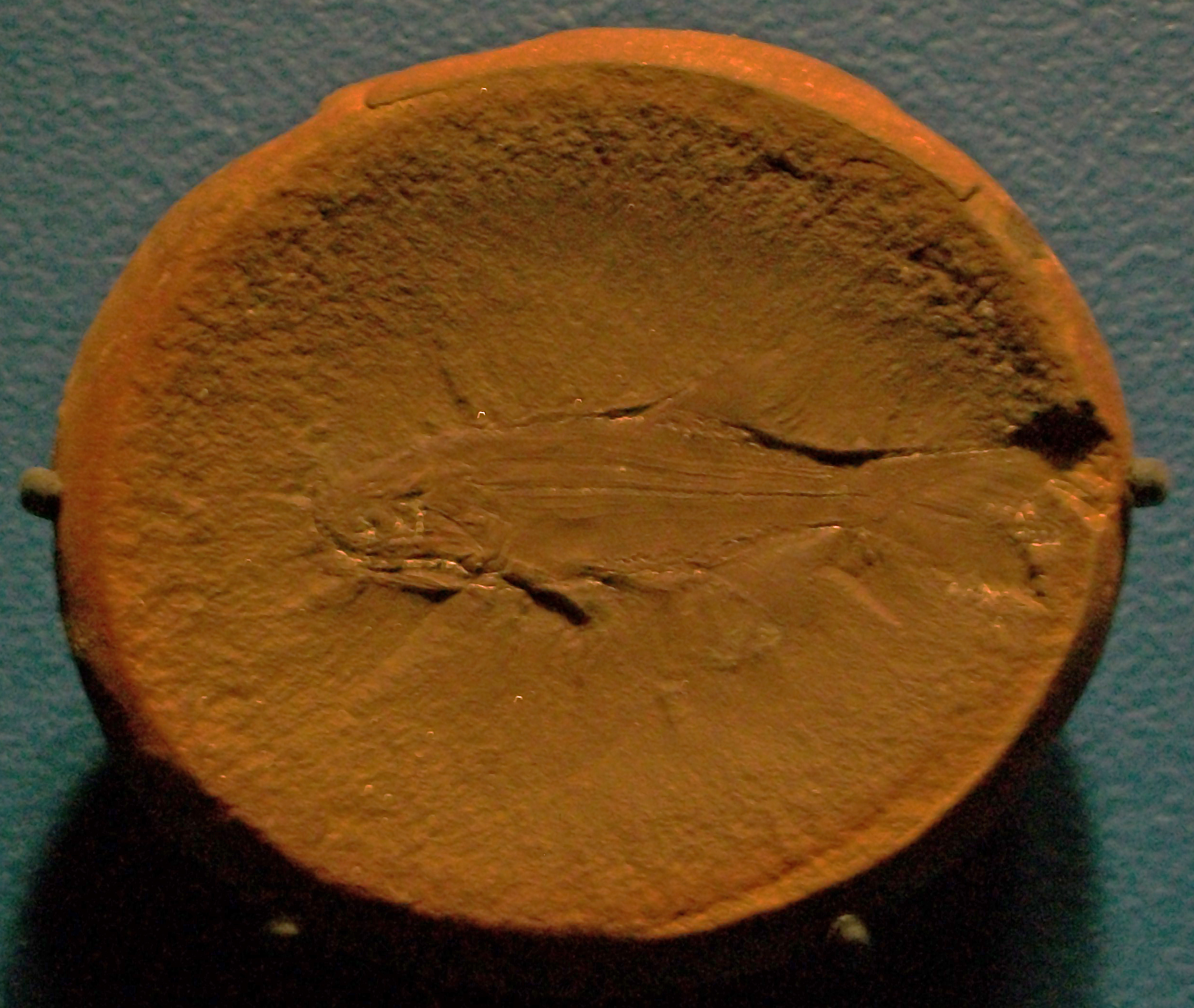
Fossil of "E." peltigerus in the Field Museum of Natural History, Chicago

- †E. aitkeni Traquair, 1886 - Carboniferous of England (Culm Measures and Lancashire Coalfield) → Mesonichthys aitkeni (Traquair, 1886)
- †E. caudalis Traquair, 1877 - Middle Carboniferous (Moscovian) of England (Lancashire Coalfield) → not an elonichthyid
- †E. egertoni (Egerton, 1850) - Middle Carboniferous (Bashkirian to Moscovian) of England (Lancashire Coalfield) → not an elonichthyid
- †E. gigas Fritsch, 1877 → Acrolepis gigas (Fritsch, 1877)
- †E. macropterus (Bronn, 1829) → Rhabdolepis macropterus (Bronn, 1829)
- †E. peltigerus Newberry, 1856 - Moscovian of Illinois and Ohio, United States (Carbondale Formation and Francis Creek Shale) → not an elonichthyid. A well-known, numerous species in the Mazon Creek fossil beds.
- †E. portlocki (Egerton, 1850) - Tournaisian to Visean of England, including Northern Ireland (Tyrone Group, Pendleside Limestones) → potentially an indeterminate elonichthyid
- †E. pulcherrimus Traquair, 1881 - Early Carboniferous (Visean) of Scotland (Glencartholm Volcanic Beds, Leitrim Group) → not an elonichthyid
- †E. robisoni (Hibbert, 1835) (=E. bucklandi (Agassiz, 1835)) - Visean of Scotland (Strathclyde Group) → not an elonichthyid, most likely a kentuckiid
- †E. serratus Traquair, 1881 - Visean of Scotland (Glencartholm Volcanic Beds, Leitrim Group) → not an elonichthyid, most likely a palaeoniscid
- †E. semistriatus Traquair, 1877 → Moscovian of England (Lancashire Coalfield) → not an elonichthyid
- †E. striatus (Agassiz, 1835) → Cosmoptychius striatus (Agassiz, 1835)

The following other dubious species are also known:

- Elonichthys disjunctus
- Elonichthys hypsilepus
- Elonichthys perpennatus
- Elonichthys punctatus
- Elonichthys whaitsi

== See also ==
- Prehistoric fish
- List of prehistoric bony fish
