= Christoph Gottfried Andreas Giebel =

German zoologist and palaeontologist (1820–1881)

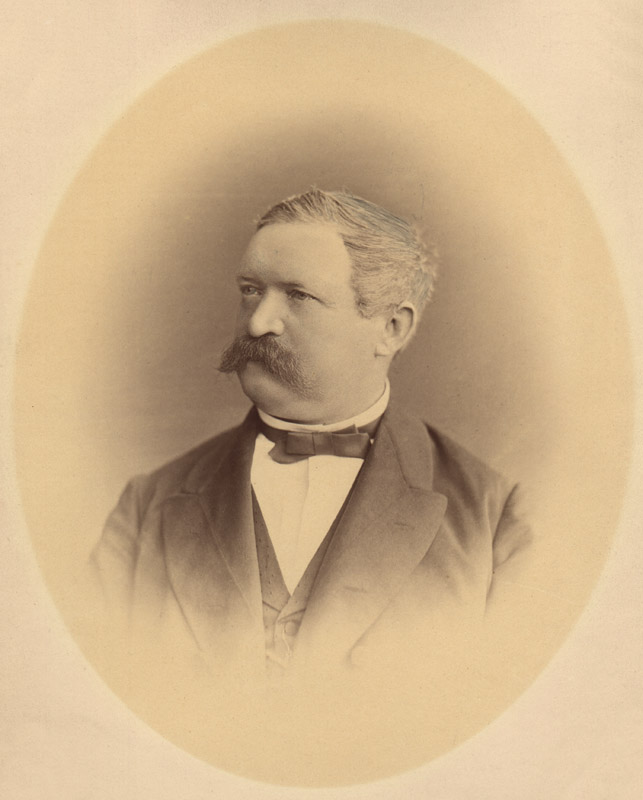

Christoph Gottfried Andreas Giebel (13 September 1820 – 14 November 1881) was a German zoologist and palaeontologist. He was a professor of zoology at the University of Halle where he managed the zoology collections at the museum. His interests were in systematics and paleontology and he opposed Darwinian evolution. He published several works including Palaozoologie (1846); Fauna der Vorwelt (1847-1856); Deutschlands Petrefacten (1852); Odontographie (1855); Lehrbuch der Zoologie (1857); and Thesaurus ornithologiae (1872-1877).

== Biography ==
Giebel was born on 13 September 1820 in Quedlinburg, Prussian Saxony where his father, Gottfried Andreas Giebel was a distillery owner. His mother was Johanna née Kühlholz. He was educated at the University of Halle where he graduated in 1845 with a Ph.D. on fossil hyenas. At Halle his instructors were Ernst Friedrich Germar and Hermann Burmeister. In 1858 he became professor of zoology and director of the museum there. He died on 14 November 1881 at Halle.

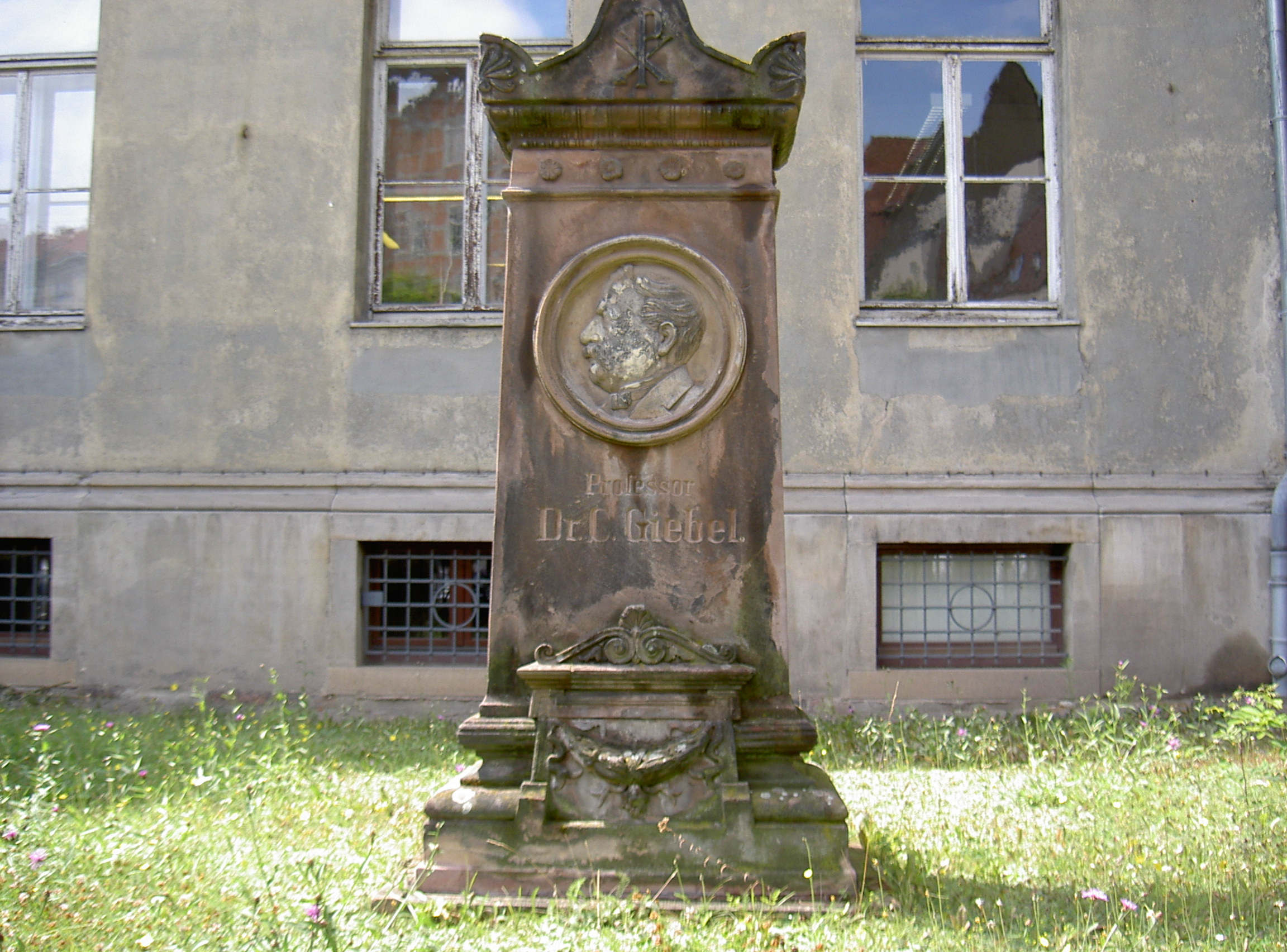
Memorial stone of Christoph Gottfried Giebel in Halle.

== Works ==
Giebel's chief publications were Palaeozoologie (1846); Fauna der Vorwelt (1847-1856); Deutschlands Petrefacten (1852); Odontographie (1855); Lehrbuch der Zoologie (1857); Thesaurus ornithologiae (1872-1877). His 5-volume Naturgeschichte des Tierreichs (1859–1864) is considered to be a forerunner to Brehms Tierleben. With Wilhelm Heinrich Heintz, he was editor of the Zeitschrift für Naturwissenschaften.

He is the taxonomic author of the extinct fish genera Asima (1848), Elonichthys (1848), and Tharsis (1847). He also described many species of ectoparasitic birdlice.
