= Claddagh (disambiguation) =

Claddagh may refer to several things associated with the island of Ireland:

- Claddagh, Galway, part of Galway city centre, formerly a fishing village on the old city outskirts
- Claddagh ring, a traditional friendship or wedding ring that originated in the Claddagh village
- Claddagh Records, a record label in Dublin

== See also ==
- Cladagh River, flows from the Marble Arch Caves to the Arney River, County Fermanagh
- River Cladagh (Swanlinbar), flows from Cuilcagh, a mountain in County Cavan, to Upper Lough Erne in County Fermanagh
