= Cliffs of Magho =

Cliffs in County Fermanagh, Northern Ireland

Coordinates: 54.4670°N 7.9065°W

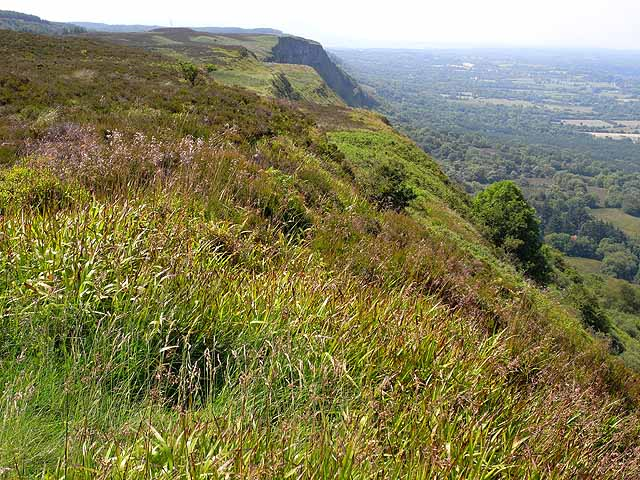
View along the Cliffs of Magho, June 2009.

The Cliffs of Magho are a 9-kilometre-long (5.6 mi) limestone escarpment located in the townland of Magho, County Fermanagh, Northern Ireland. The NNW-facing cliffs overlook the western reaches of Lower Lough Erne and define the northern edge of Lough Navar Forest, a major plantation managed by the Forest Service of Northern Ireland. A popular viewpoint atop the cliffs is accessed by a forest drive.

The escarpment is formed from two distinct bands of Carboniferous limestone: the Glencar Limestone Formation and the overlying Dartry Limestone Formation. These overlie a series of mudrocks known as the Benbulben Shale Formation. Under the cliffs there is a mostly continuous apron of scree and landslip material.

The cliffs are a proposed Area of Special Scientific Interest. They are home to the Irish Rock-bristle (Seligeria oelandica), a black moss found on wet calcareous rocks and known only from this site in the whole of the United Kingdom, though found elsewhere in the Republic of Ireland.

On 18 November 1943 a Royal Air Force, Short Sunderland (W4036) flying boat of No. 201 Squadron RAF was operating a training flight, practicing takeoffs and landings on Lough Erne. During one takeoff the aircraft overshot flare path, and shortly after the left wing struck the lough. The pilots lost control of the aircraft & crashed into Cliffs of Magho, bursting into flames on impact. Three of the eight crew on board died in the crash.

Since 2007 these cliffs have formed a part of the Marble Arch Caves Global Geopark.

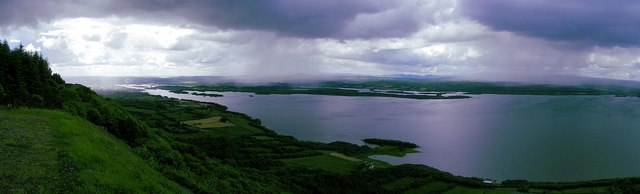
View across Lower Lough Erne from the cliffs, July 2006.
