= Owenbrean River =

River in Northern Ireland

Coordinates: 54.24667°N 7.79686°W

Owenbrean
- Native name: Abhainn Bhréan (Irish)

Location
- Country: United Kingdom
- Region: Northern Ireland
- County: County Fermanagh

Physical characteristics
- Source
  - location: Eastern Cuilcagh Mountain
- Mouth: River Cladagh
  - location: Marble Arch Caves
- Length: 8.5 km (5.3 mi)

The Owenbrean River (Irish: Abhainn Bhréan or "stinking river"), is a small river in County Fermanagh, Northern Ireland which flows down from Cuilcagh Mountain before sinking underground, eventually reaching the Marble Arch Cave system.

== Main route ==
The Owenbrean flows underground through Pollasumera, until it sumps and appears again in nearby Pollnagollum of the Boats. The river eventually enters the Marble Arch system via Skreen Hill 3—a 650-metre (2,130 ft) long stretch of cave only accessible by divers—Skreen Hill 2 and Skreen Hill 1, which is the furthest section of the show cave. During the guided tour of the Marble Arch Caves, visitors are led on a subterranean pathway alongside the Owenbrean River, as well as travelling upon it for a short while on an underground boat journey. The Owenbrean meets the combined Sruh Croppa and Aghinrawn at The Junction, which is halfway along the boat tour.

== Separation ==
Upstream of the main sinks in the blind gorge, the Owenbrean is also known to lose a portion of its flow as it is diverted into the Upper and Lower Sinks. These feed into the Prod's Pot–Cascades Rising cave system, from which the waters emerge above ground again around 2.5 km (1.6 mi) away in Cladagh Glen, rejoining the Owenbrean's original flow in its new form as the River Cladagh (Dunn, J.).

== See also ==
- Marble Arch Caves Global Geopark
