= Tyrone Group =

Succession of rock strata in Northern Ireland

- Stratigraphic range: Courceyan to Asbian – Carboniferous)
- Type: Group
- Unit of: Carboniferous Limestone Supergroup
- Sub-units: Dartry Limestone, Glencar Limestone, Benbulben Shale, Mullaghmore Sandstone, Bundoran Shale, Ballyshannon Limestone, Clogher Valley and Ballyness formations
- Underlies: Leitrim Group
- Overlies: Fintona Group
- Thickness: ~2400m

Lithology
- Primary: limestones
- Other: sandstone, conglomerates, mudstone, shale

Location
- Country: Northern Ireland
- Extent: County Fermanagh, County Tyrone

Type section
- Named for: County Tyrone

The Tyrone Group is a lithostratigraphical term coined to refer to a particular succession of rock strata which occur in Northern Ireland within the Visean Stage of the Carboniferous Period. It comprises a series of limestones, shales and sandstones which accumulated to a thickness of 2400m in the northwest Carboniferous basin of Ireland. The type areas for the group are the Clogher Valley of County Tyrone and the Fermanagh Highlands of nearby County Fermanagh. The rocks of the group sit unconformably on older rocks of the Shanmullagh Formation of the Fintona Group which are the local representatives of the Lower Old Red Sandstone. The top of the Dartry Limestone, the uppermost part of the group, is a disconformity, above which are the layered sandstones and shales of the Meenymore Formation of the Leitrim Group. The succession continues south and west across the border into the Republic of Ireland, though different names are typically applied.

== Constituent geological formations ==
In stratigraphic order (youngest/uppermost at top), its constituent formations are:

=== Dartry Limestone Formation ===
Traditionally known as the Upper Limestone, the Dartry Limestone is a significant landscape-forming rock unit dating from the Asbian substage. It is dark grey and argillaceous in nature and includes some fossils and chert nodules or beds. The type area is in the Benbulben Range and Dartry Mountains of County Sligo. Up to 350m thick, it is subdivided with several distinct ‘rock units’ or ‘members’ recognised. In stratigraphic order, these are:

- Carn Limestone
- Cloghany Limestone (a bioclastic crinoidal grainstone between 0.5 and 1.25m thick)
- Carrickmacsparrow Limestone (a crinoidal biosparite or packstone, fawn in colour, from 4-11m thick)
- Cloghan Hill Limestone (30-50m thick, mud mounds amidst shales, silts and limestones, includes coral bioherms)
- Knockmore Limestone (between 0-290m thick, lenticular mounds of grey micrites)

In the Irish Republic, this rock sequence is known as the Bricklieve Limestone Formation.

=== Glencar Limestone Formation ===
This formation which was formerly referred to as the upper part of the Middle or Calp Limestone is a 100-180m thickness of grey limestone with interbedded shale and mudstone) Its outcrop runs from west of Swanlinbar to Lough Macnean Lower then via Boho to the Cliffs of Magho overlooking Lower Lough Erne. It is also found widely around Sligo Bay to the west.

=== Benbulben Shale Formation ===
Known previously as the lower part of the Middle or Calp Limestone and of the Upper Calp Shale, this 60-120m thickness of mudstones with fossil-rich grey limestones and thin calciturbidites and sandstones make up the formation. The outcrop runs from north of Monaghan towards Upper Lough Erne then north to Maguiresbridge. West of the lough, a broad outcrop runs north to the Derrygonnelly area. From beneath the Cliffs of Magho, the outcrop wraps around the south of Lough Melvin generally west to Glencar Lough. There are further outcrops north of Ederney and running NE-SW through Manorhamilton.

=== Mullaghmore Sandstone Formation ===
Variously known in the past as the Middle or Calp Sandstone, Upper Calp (Macnean) Sandstone and Clonelly Sandstone Group, about 200m thickness of brown to grey sandstones interbedded with mudstones and siltstones make up this formation. A thin band extends southwest and northeast from Scotstown in County Monaghan whilst a broader band is found east of Lough Macnean Lower, running north to Derrygonnelly. A narrow outcrop runs northeast-southwest through Manorhamilton. The most extensive area is around Lough Melvin west to Mullaghmore Head and including Inishmurray. A further band wraps south towards Sligo. There are other outcrops west of Ballyshannon, around Mountcharles from Lough Bradan Forest to the shores of Lower Lough Erne.

=== Bundoran Shale Formation ===
Known variously in the past as the Middle or Calp Limestone, or Lower and Middle Calp Shales, this 80-450m thickness of dark grey mudstones with layers of bioclastic limestone includes at its base, the Skea Sandstone Member (a.k.a. the Dowra Sandstone Member). Its outcrop extends from northeast of Monaghan southwest to Upper Lough Erne, though is largely covered by more recent deposits. A band of these shales extends west of Enniskillen to north of Derrygonnelly. There are broken outcrops around the northern shore of Lower Lough Erne and from the west end of the lough to the coast at Bundoran and further outcrops around the northeast of Donegal Bay. There are more further west between Kinlough and Drumcliff whilst another band runs southwest from Manorhamilton. Occurrences of this rock further south in the Republic of Ireland are known as the Lisgorman Shale Formation.

=== Ballyshannon Limestone Formation ===
Formerly known as the Pettigo Limestone Group or the Lower Limestone, this 120-450m thickness of blue-grey limestones with interbeds of silty shale, includes the Gortnaree Sandstone Member at its base. It outcrops in the country between Clabby and Brookeborough and in a small area east of Aughnacloy. A further outcrop extends from north of Monaghan west then along the border from Rosslea to Upper Lough Erne and then through Enniskillen and the western edge of the lough as far as Church Hill. It also occurs in the Kesh and Ederney areas and in a broken curved outcrop towards Drumquin then northwest to Slieve Glass then west and southwest to Pettigoe and the north shore of Lower Lough Erne to Belleek. It is widespread east of Donegal Bay in the country around Ballintra and east of Donegal. There are further outcrops around Sligo Bay and southwest from Manorhamilton. In the Irish Republic, this rock sequence is known as the Oakport Limestone Formation.

=== Clogher Valley Formation ===
The formation which comprises peritidal limestones and shales is evident in the Castlecaulfield area and extends from Ballygawley through Clogher to the Fivemiletown area. The outcrop also extends southwest from the Tempo area to south of Lisbellaw and along the northeast edge of Enniskillen to the eastern shores of Lower Lough Erne.

=== Ballyness Formation ===
Formerly known by various names including the Lower Carboniferous Sandstone, Basal Clastics and Calciferous Sandstone, the formation comprises about 300m thickness of red sandstones and quartz conglomerates. Though much obscured by superficial deposits, its outcrop extends from the countryside north of Donamore southwestwards towards Clogher and in the area between Fivemiletown and Fintona. A further outcrop extends northwest from Lisbellaw to Ballycassidy and the eastern shores of Lower Lough Erne.
