= Badger Pot =

Caves found in County Fermanagh, Northern Ireland

Coordinates: 54.242°N 7.668°W

Badger Pot and Pigeon Pot are two caves found in the Karst topography on the eastern slopes of Cuilcagh Mountain, south of Florencecourt Forest Park, County Fermanagh, Northern Ireland.

They are sourced from small rivers which, at each pot, sink below ground. Dye tracing has linked these sinks to the underground river of the Prod's Pot–Cascades cave system. This river in turn rises at Cladagh Glen and feeds into the Cladagh River, before ultimately discharging into Upper Lough Erne.

Dye tracing has also proved a further underground link to Shannon Pot in County Cavan, suggesting that the latter may once have had a substantially larger catchment area.

== See also ==
- Marble Arch Caves
