= Marble Arch Caves =

Limestone caves in Northern Ireland

- Uaimheanna an hÁirse Marmair
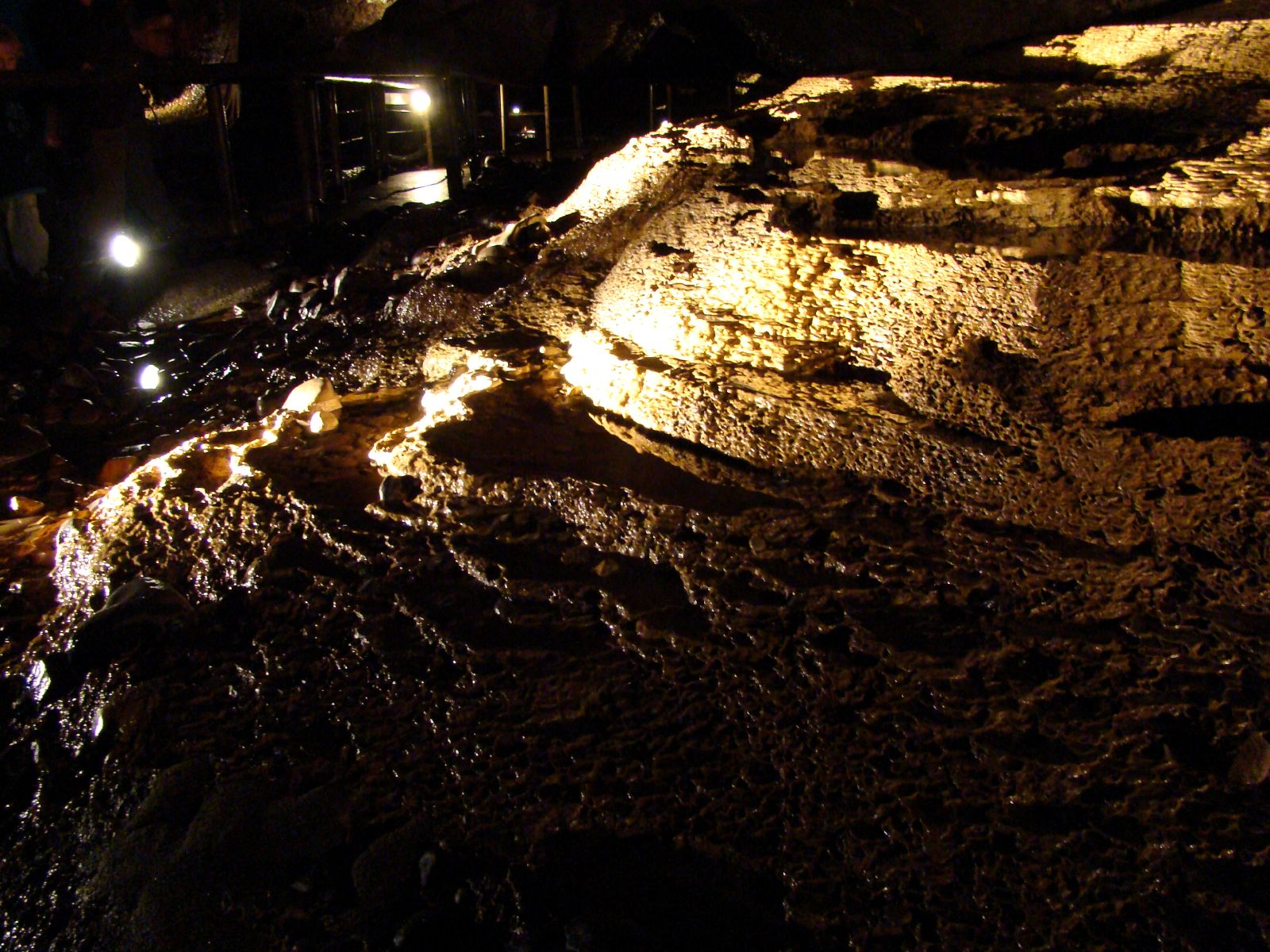
- "The Castle" gour pool formations in the Marble Arch Caves show cave

- Location within Northern Ireland
- Location: near Florencecourt, County Fermanagh
- Coordinates: 54°15′30.34″N 7°48′51.53″W
- Depth: 94 m
- Length: 11.5 km (7.1 mi)
- Discovery: 1895
- Access: Show cave; accessible beyond with permission from Marble Arch Caves centre

The Marble Arch Caves are a series of natural limestone caves located near the village of Florencecourt in County Fermanagh, Northern Ireland. The caves are named after the nearby Marble Arch, a natural limestone arch at the upstream end of Cladagh Glen under which the Cladagh River flows. The caves are formed from three rivers draining off the northern slopes of Cuilcagh mountain, which combine underground to form the Cladagh. On the surface, the river emerges from the largest karst resurgence in Ireland, and one of the largest in the United Kingdom. At 11.5 kilometres (7.1 mi), the Marble Arch Caves form the longest known cave system in Northern Ireland, and the karst is considered to be among the finest in the British Isles.

== History ==
=== 18th–19th century: The Junction, Grand Gallery, and Pool Chamber ===
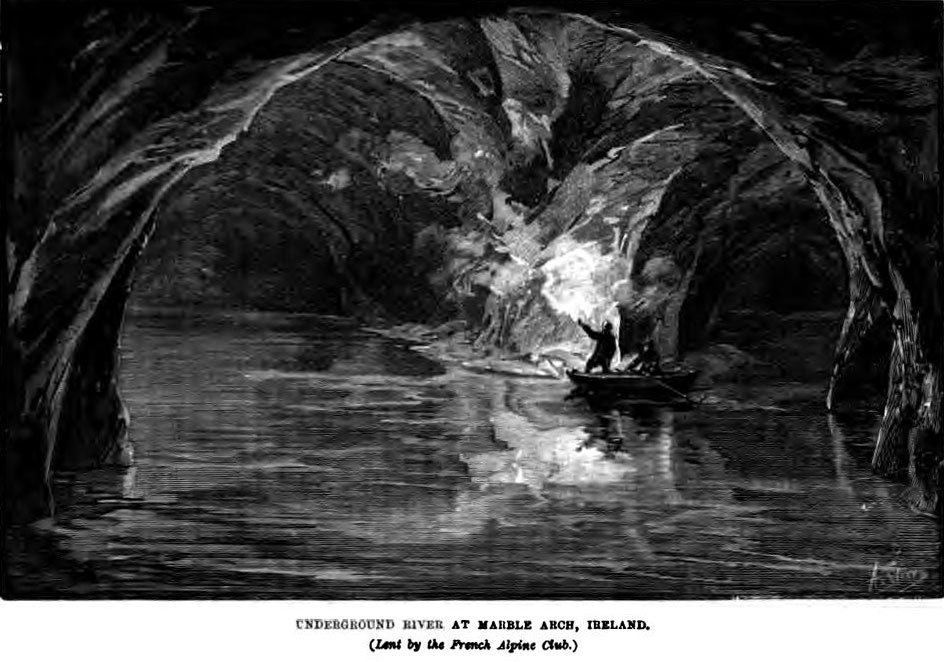
Drawing by É. A. Martel, depicting the first exploration of Marble Arch Caves in 1895

The Marble Arch, Cladagh River resurgence and three large dolines on the plateau above the end of Cladagh Glen were all known well before underground exploration began; in fact the arch was a popular tourist attraction in the 19th century. As early as the 1730s, the Reverend William Henry described these features, as well as the sinks of the Owenbrean, Aghinrawn and Sruh Croppa rivers which he correctly surmised to be feeders of the system.

Without venturing far into the cave, Henry descended to the base of one of the dolines above the resurgence:

The arch over my head was 20 feet high, continued with a little landing for 100 yards to the other great pit, by the light of which I could observe the river flowing gently along...

— Rev. William Henry, A Natural History of the Parish of Killesher (1732)

The stream passages at the base of each shakehole were first explored by Édouard-Alfred Martel and Dublin naturalist Lyster Jameson in 1895. Using a canvas boat, and with candles and magnesium flares for light, Martel and Jameson found 300 metres (1,000 ft) of passages, including the junction where the three rivers (the Owenbrean and the combined Aghinrawn and Sruh Croppa) meet. (Note: Ordnance Survey maps of the area incorrectly label the rivers west–east as the "Sruh Croppa", "Owenbrean or Monastir" and leave the most easterly river unnamed. Early reports of cave exploration on Cuilcagh Mountain use this naming convention, while later publications use the correct local names of Sruh Croppa, Aghinrawn (or Monastir) and Owenbrean.) They drew a map of the discoveries and line drawings depicting the expedition, noting the upstream conclusion by boat in the Grand Gallery, and on foot at Pool Chamber. Today, this route to Pool Chamber forms part of the walking section of the show cave.

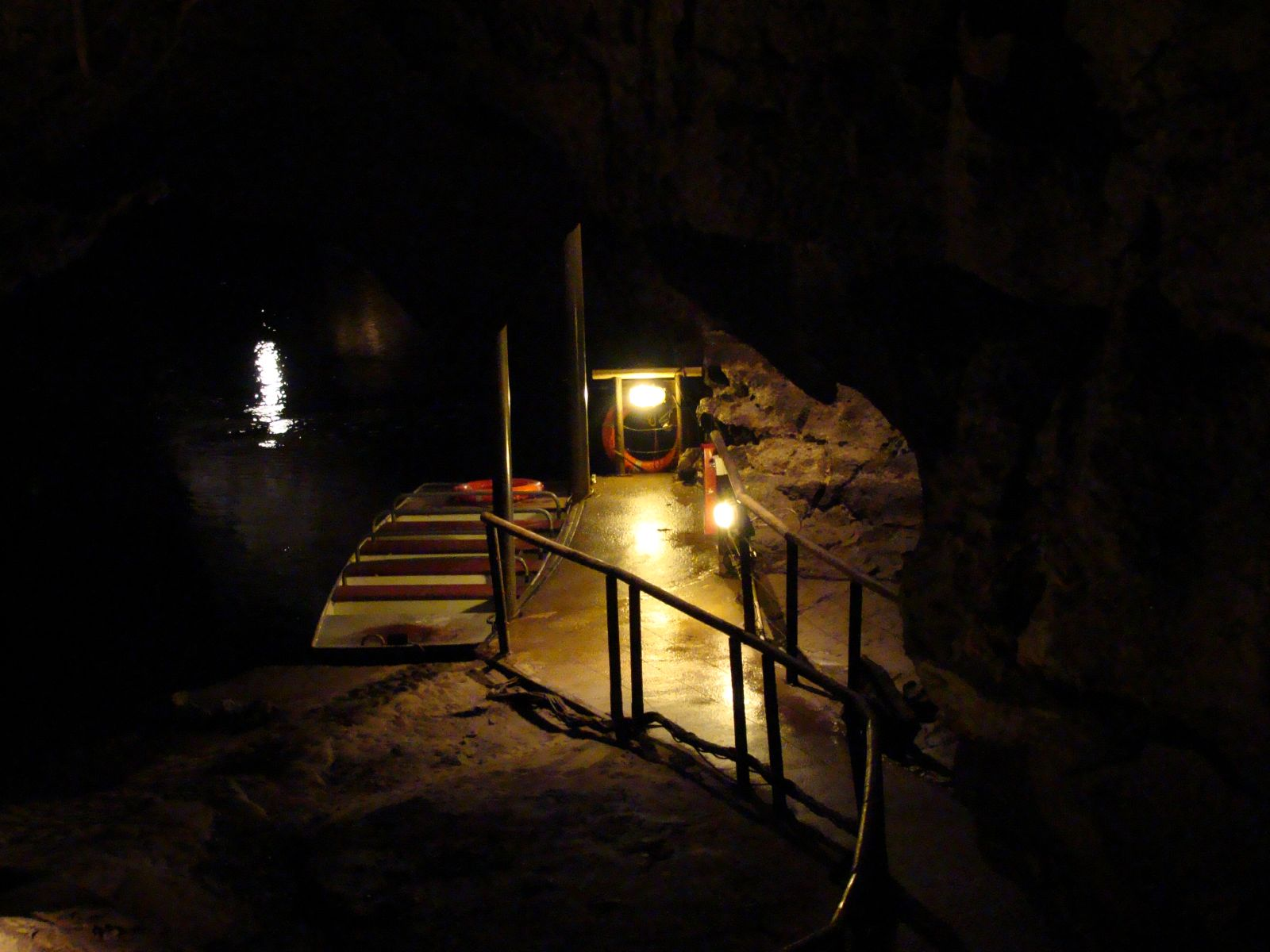
Today, visitors disembark at the same place that Jameson and Martel first made landfall.

Martel and Jameson also investigated Cradle Hole, a very large surface shakehole 400 metres (1/4 mi) south-south-west of Marble Arch. A cave entrance in the north-eastern corner—Lower Cradle—was explored, reaching an underground river and passages with the same proportions as those in the Marble Arch Cave.

=== 1907–1908: Great Boulder Chamber and dye tracing ===
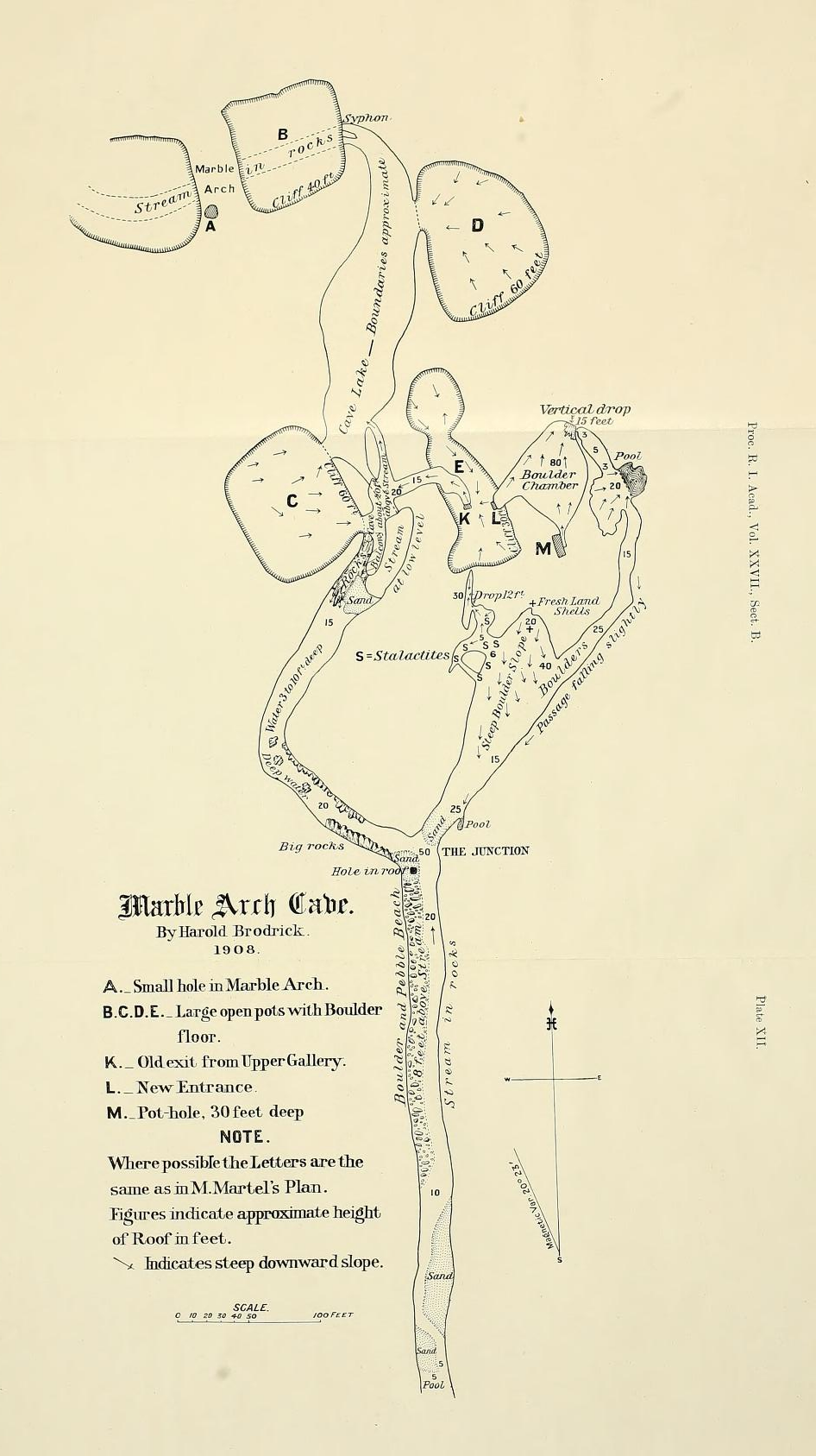
1908 survey of Marble Arch Caves by the Yorkshire Ramblers' Club

In 1907, English cavers from the Yorkshire Ramblers' Club began exploration in the area, and without access to a boat they decided to wade the section of underground river as far as The Junction, subsequently reaching the extent of Martel and Jameson's explorations. Bolstered by the experience, and the good possibility of further discoveries, the Yorkshire Ramblers returned in Easter 1908. A group of cavers descended a pothole located close to the large dolines on the plateau and discovered the Great Boulder Chamber. After a few hours of exploring, they realised that they had found a new route into Pool Chamber, bypassing the deep water of the original entrance.

During the 1908 explorations, the Yorkshire Ramblers conducted tests to ascertain the hydrological connections between caves. They performed a dye tracing experiment with fluorescein, establishing a direct hydrological connection from the Aghinrawn River sink at Monastir cliff, via Upper Cradle Hole Cave (situated on the south side of Cradle Hole), to the Cladagh Glen resurgence. While surveying Lower Cradle Hole Cave, one caver sent a floating candle downstream along the river, until it floated under a low ceiling out of sight at the end of the known passage. On plotting the surveyed passage on a map alongside Marble Arch Cave, it was apparent that only 9 metres (30 ft) separated the end of this passage from the upstream end of the Grand Gallery, and it was postulated that a connection between the two might be forged.

=== 1935–1938: Skreen Hill and connections ===
No further exploration was made until Easter 1935 when another group from the Yorkshire Ramblers' Club made their way from England. In wet conditions, the cavers re-entered Pool Chamber via the entrance found in 1908, and after some investigation discovered a high-level crawling passage exiting the chamber. The passage ended high in the wall of New Chamber, a cavern of considerable size, where the upstream continuation of the river was found. Exploration was halted here as the water was too deep to pass.

The club returned to New Chamber in 1936 to explore and survey the ongoing Skreen Hill passage, named after the hill on the surface above. After 370 metres (1,200 ft) of walking passage, the cavers stopped at a deep lake. This section of deep water is where the path of the current show cave ends. When club members returned again in 1938, they brought an inflatable dinghy, allowing them to progress across the lake, only to discover that the way on was blocked by Sump 1, just 40 metres (132 ft) from the shore.

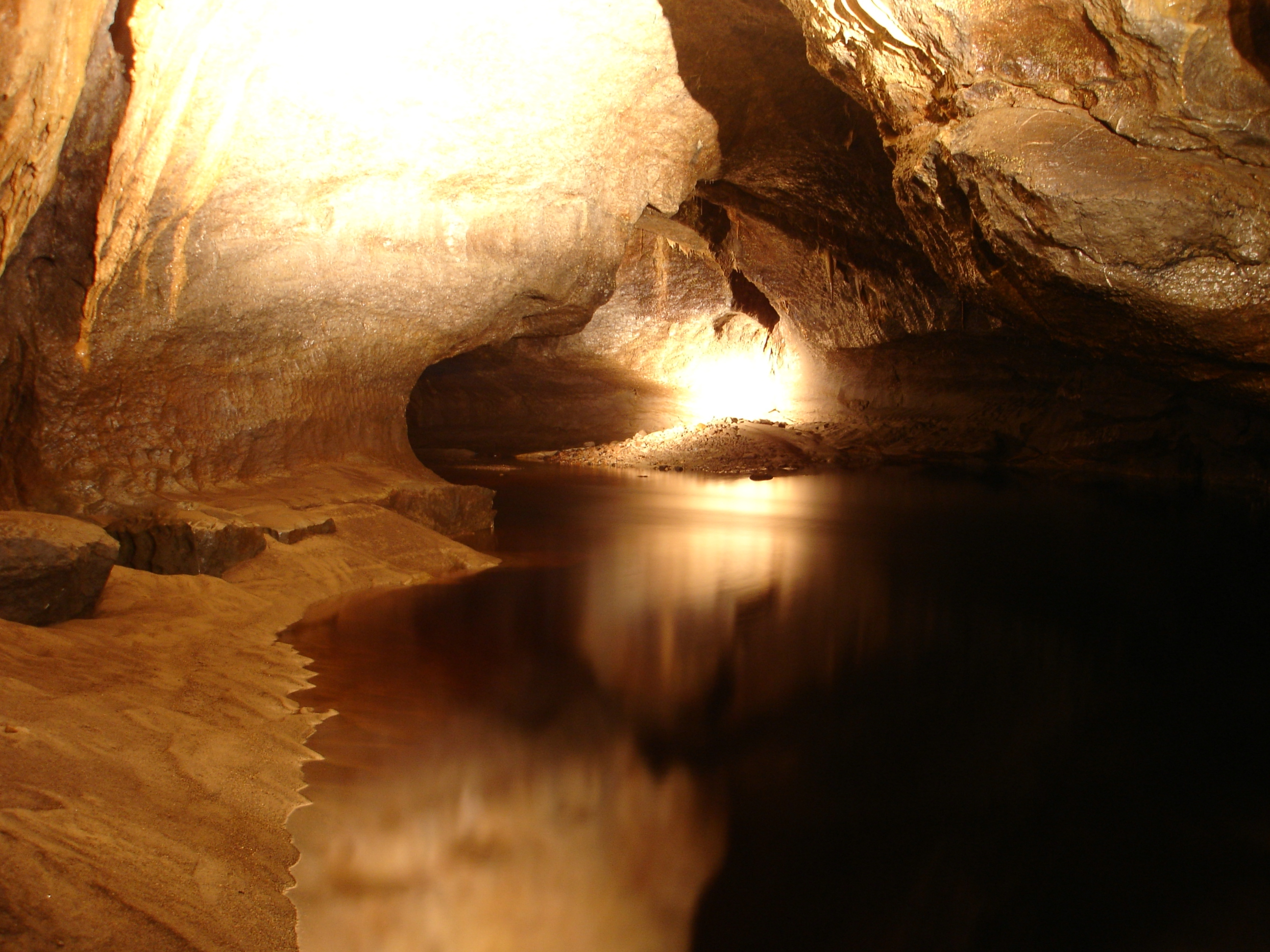
Lake in Skreen Hill at the upstream extent of the present show cave, shortly before Sump 1

During the 1935 expedition, another group of cavers explored Lower Cradle Hole Cave. On reaching the downstream end of the cave, they discovered that water levels were now low enough to see a series of low arches above the water surface. By anchoring a floating candle part-way through the passage, exiting the cave and returning to the end of the Grand Gallery in Marble Arch Cave, the cavers confirmed that the passages were connected; subsequently, two of the party swam through to make the first through-trip between Marble Arch Cave and Lower Cradle Hole Cave.

=== 1966–1967: Skreen Hill 2, 3 and Legnabrocky Way ===
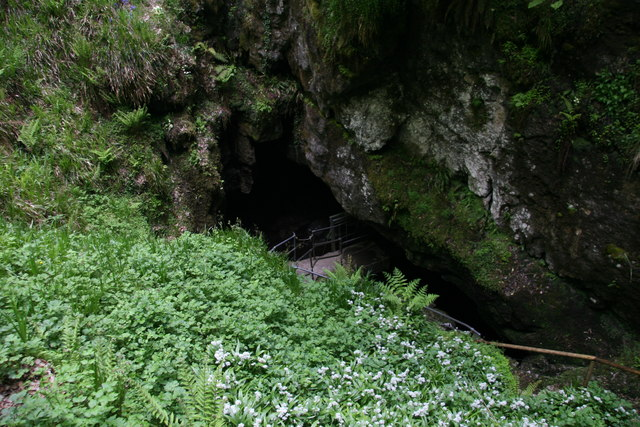
One of the traditional entrances to the underground Cladagh River: now an entrance to the show cave by boat.

By the mid-1960s, a number of advancements had been made in cave diving, by which method speleologists had extended their explorations into caves beyond the sumps that would normally have halted progress. In December 1966 divers Dave Cobley and Mike Boon made preparations to dive Sump 1 in Skreen Hill passage. Before making the dive however, they investigated a small dry passage leading off on the left bank of the lake, finding it to be blocked at the end by unstable boulders in the roof. The cavers removed one of the boulders to reveal a way on, which led via a dry route to the far side of Sump 1. The new 200-metre (660 ft) section of river passage beyond was named Skreen Hill 2, and a further 800-metre (1/2 mi) inlet passage was named Legnabrocky Way. A notable feature of the Legnabrocky Way is the Giant's Hall, a large chamber 60 m long, 30 m high and 15 m wide (200×98×49 ft). Despite only carrying a small stream, the Legnabrocky Way is the largest section of passage in Marble Arch Cave.

The upstream continuation of the river in Skreen Hill 2 was found to be shortly blocked by Sump 3, so in March 1967 a team of divers returned to attempt further exploration. William Frakes and John Ogden were the first to successfully pass the 25-metre (82 ft) sump to reach Skreen Hill 3, 640 metres (2,100 ft) of "magnificent stream passage" ending in boulder choke. In the ensuing months a comprehensive survey was made of all of Marble Arch Caves, including the newly discovered sections. During this time, surveyors learned of the deaths of Frakes, Ogden and Colin Vickers—another of the divers in the original team—in the Mossdale Caverns accident. In tribute, a number of cave features in Skreen Hill 3 were named after the three cavers.

=== 1982–1985: show cave development ===
From 1982, until after opening in 1985, sections of Marble Arch Cave underwent development to improve accessibility in order to accept tourist visitors. As well as concrete pathways, safety barriers and electric lighting, this involved installing weirs and jetties for boat access to enable visitors to enter the caves by the same route that Martel and the early explorers took.

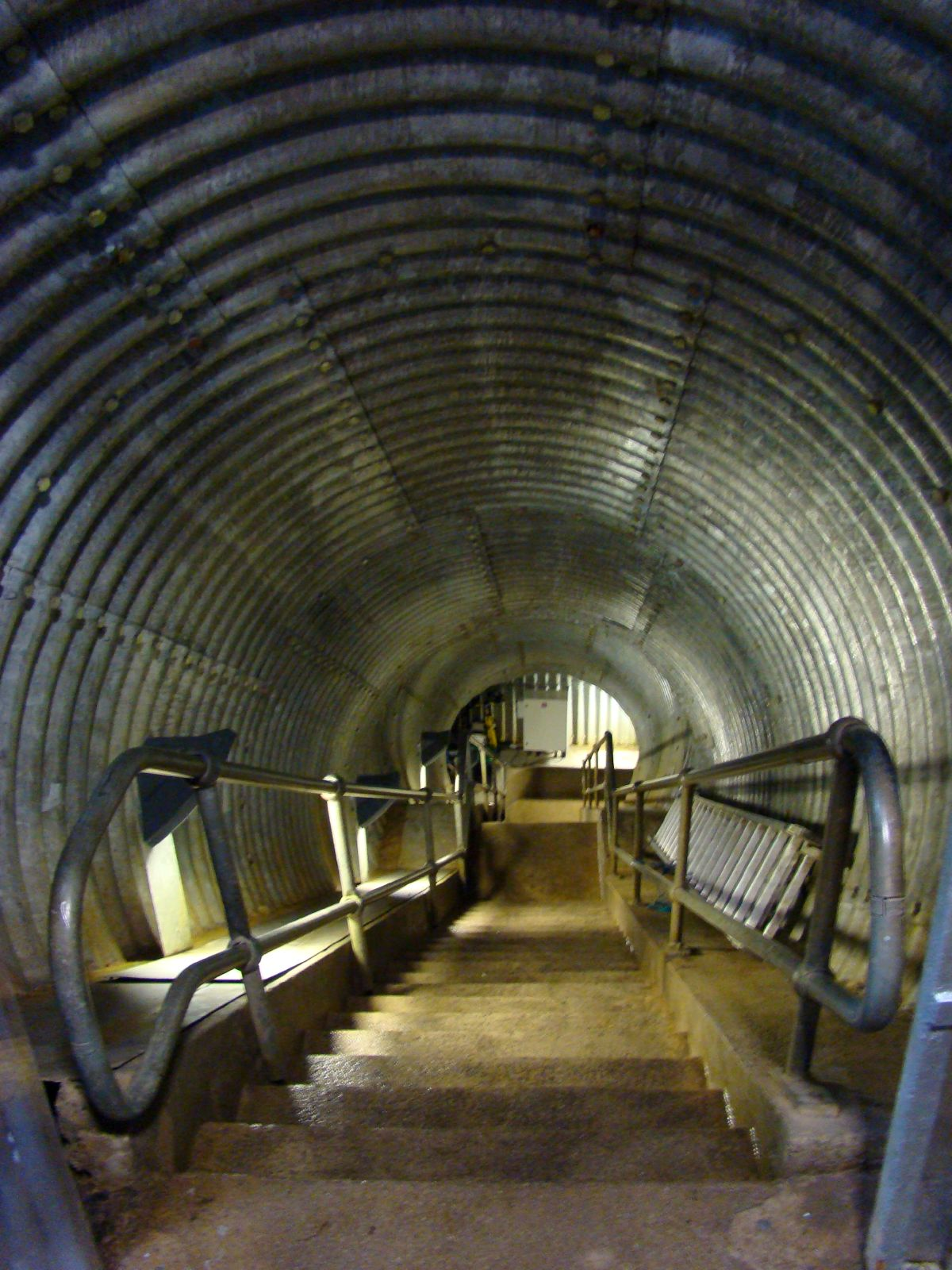
The man-made show cave exit also serves as an entrance during times when boats are not in use.

The development also included boring a new entrance shaft into Skreen Hill and, significantly, excavating a corridor using quarrymens' plugs and feathers (instead of potentially damaging explosives) through the short section of rock separating Pool Chamber from New Chamber. This connected Skreen Hill all the way to The Junction for walking visitors for the first time.

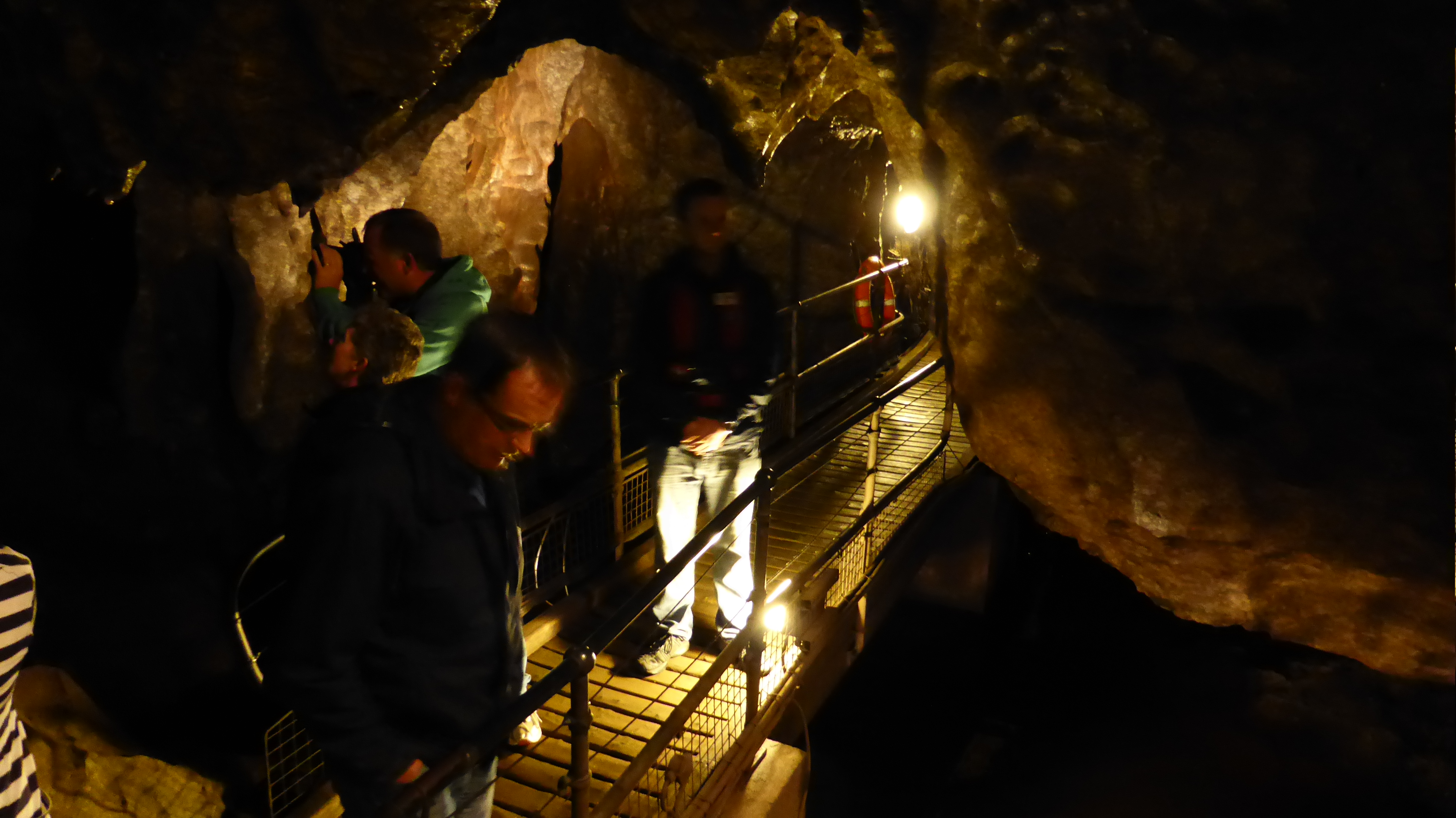
An elevated section of the walkway between New Chamber and Pool Chamber

At this time, all known entrances to the cave system were gated to control access. From then on, cavers were only allowed access by agreement with show cave management. The show cave has since become established as a popular tourist attraction.

=== 1995: Cradle Hole tragedy ===
Three cavers died on a trip into Lower Cradle Hole on 15 January 1995. They were in a group of ten cavers, mostly students from University College Dublin and Dublin Institute of Technology caving clubs, when the three were swept away by fast running water and drowned in the low air-space (or "duck", (which was flooded to the roof on this particular occasion) section of passage between the end of Lower Cradle Hole and the Grand Gallery in Marble Arch Cave. Those killed were Philip Marshall (20), Brian Patrick Kennedy (22) and Conleth Cormican (21).

A memorial plaque outside Lower Cradle commemorates the disaster, and the entrance remains accessible to cavers via a gate. Three oak saplings were also planted on the grassy area south of the car park by each of the families on the tenth anniversary of the accident.

=== 2009–2010: diving connections ===
In 2009 and 2010, diving connections were made to nearby cave systems by Artur Kozłowski. Kozłowski made the first connecting dive to Prod's Pot – Cascades Rising, doubling the total length of the system from 4.5 to 9 km (2.8 to 5.6 mi). Subsequently, he and Chris Jewell connected the newly established Monastir Sink – Upper Cradle system, extending the Marble Arch system to 11.5 km (7.1 mi). The discoveries make this the longest cave in Northern Ireland.

== Hydrology and development ==
The main section of Marble Arch Cave is fed by three rivers on the slopes of Cuilcagh Mountain.

The Marble Arch Cave system is chiefly formed from three rivers which drain off the Marlbank area on the north side of Cuilcagh mountain. From west to east, these tributaries are the Sruh Croppa, the Aghinrawn (or Monastir) and the Owenbrean.

The Prod's Pot – Cascades Rising section of the system (connected to Marble Arch Caves in 2009) has a complex hydrology which includes drainage from at least five small sinks on the eastern Marlbank (Gortmaconnell Pot, Little Gortmaconnell Pot, Smokey Mountain Sink and two unnamed sinks at Brookfield have been dye traced to Cascades); sections of the Owenbrean River upstream of its main sink at Pollasumera; and most notably Goat Pot, Aghatirourke Pot, Pigeon Pots and Badger Pot on East Cuilcagh, nearly 3 kilometres (1.9 mi) to the southeast. Of these, Goat Pot and Aghatirourke Pot have also been traced to Tullyhona Rising (1.5 kilometres (0.93 mi) east-southeast from Cascades Rising); Pigeon Pots, Badger Pot and Aghatirourke Pot also flow to Gortalughany Rising (an overflow rising on East Cuilcagh); and Badger Pot and Pigeon Pots also flow to Shannon Pot on the far western slopes of Cuilcagh.

== Show cave ==
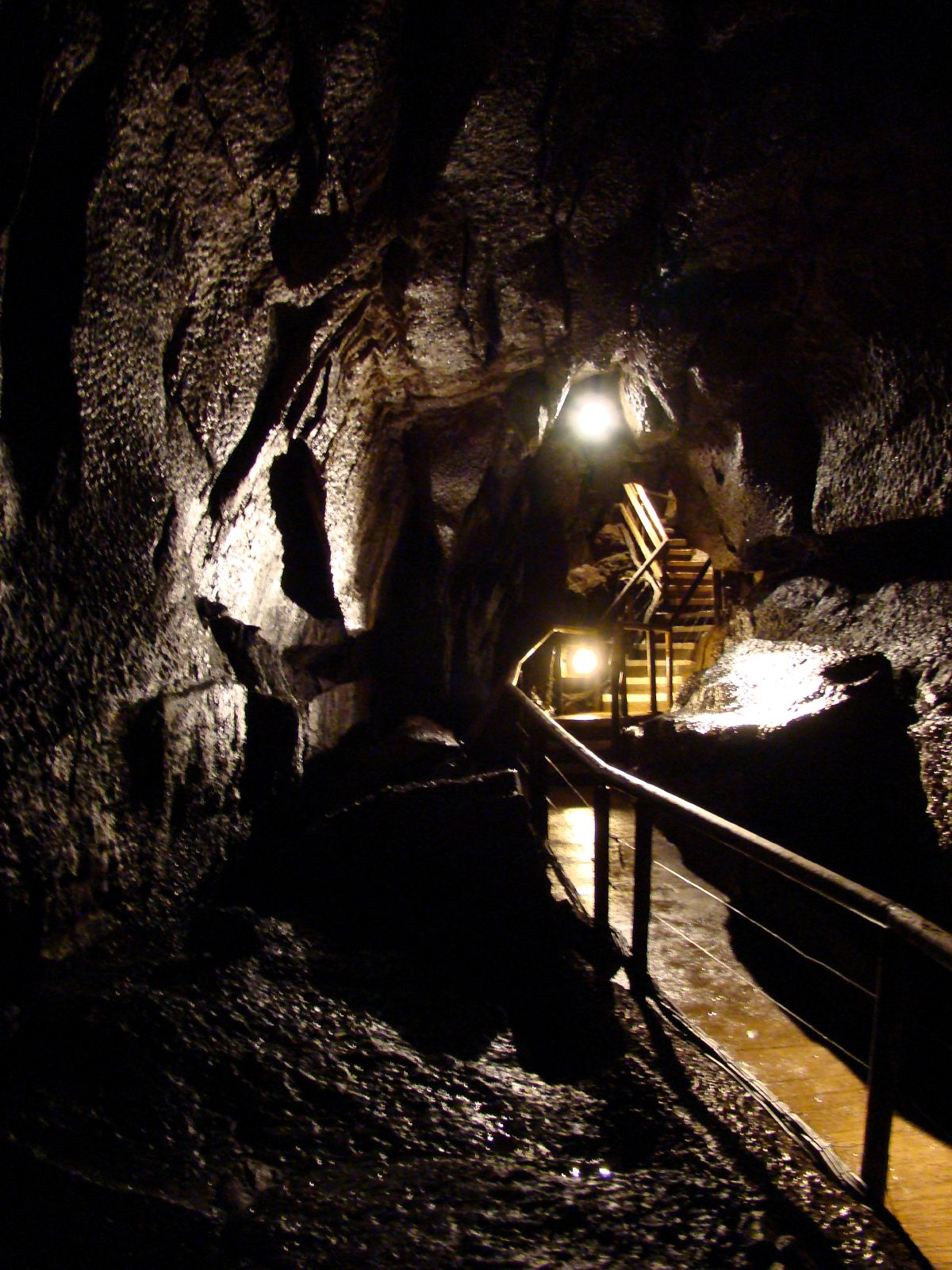
A section of cave passage and walkway in the showcave

Édouard-Alfred Martel first postulated that Marble Arch Cave would make a worthy show cave after initially exploring the system in 1895. However, it was not until 1982 that work eventually began on creating a new underground tourist attraction. Development included:

- Building concrete and metal walkways with handrails throughout the show cave;
- Installation of electric lighting;
- A new tunnel between Pool Chamber and New Chamber, providing walking access to Skreen Hill passageways;
- An access shaft and staircase into Skreen Hill passage from one of the large surface dolines on the plateau;
- A short section of walled pathway dug into the floor of the cave, under a low ceiling—the "Moses Walk" is so-called because the river continues to run at shoulder level either side of the path;
- A visitor centre, car park and access road on the surface.

Covering a section of the main stream passage of the system, the Marble Arch Caves show cave was opened to the public on 29 May 1985. Visitors travel through the first part of the caves by boat on the subterranean Cladagh River, before walking through the rest of the chambers.

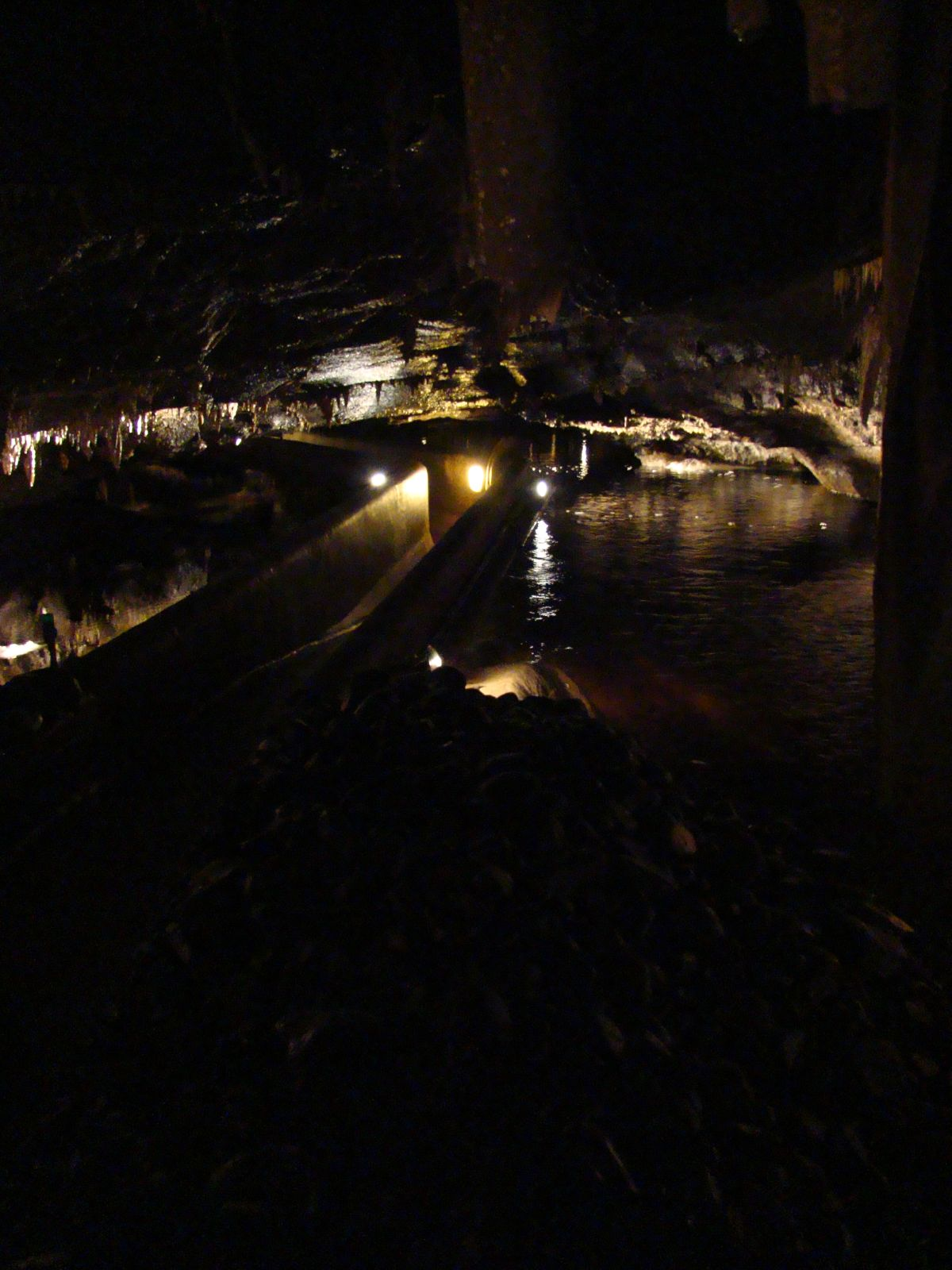
At the "Moses Walk", the path sinks into the riverbed to pass a low-ceilinged section of passage.

Between 1985 and 2008, the show cave attracted approximately 1 million visitors, from 100 countries worldwide. Annual visitor capacity (during the period that the cave is open, March–September) is 94,060.

== European/Global Geopark status ==
In 2001, the caves and the nearby Cuilcagh Mountain Park joined to become a European Geopark under the name Marble Arch Caves European Geopark, the first park in the UK to be recognised by the European Geoparks Network (EGN). This allocation was due in part to the existence of the caves themselves and also the rare blanket bog which covers a vast area of the mountains. Under an agreement between the EGN and the UNESCO Earth Sciences division in 2004, the park became part of the Global Network of National Geoparks (GGN) scheme and was renamed Marble Arch Caves Global Geopark. In 2008, the park boundaries were extended across the border into parts of County Cavan in the Republic of Ireland, making it the first international Geopark in the world.

== Conservation issues ==
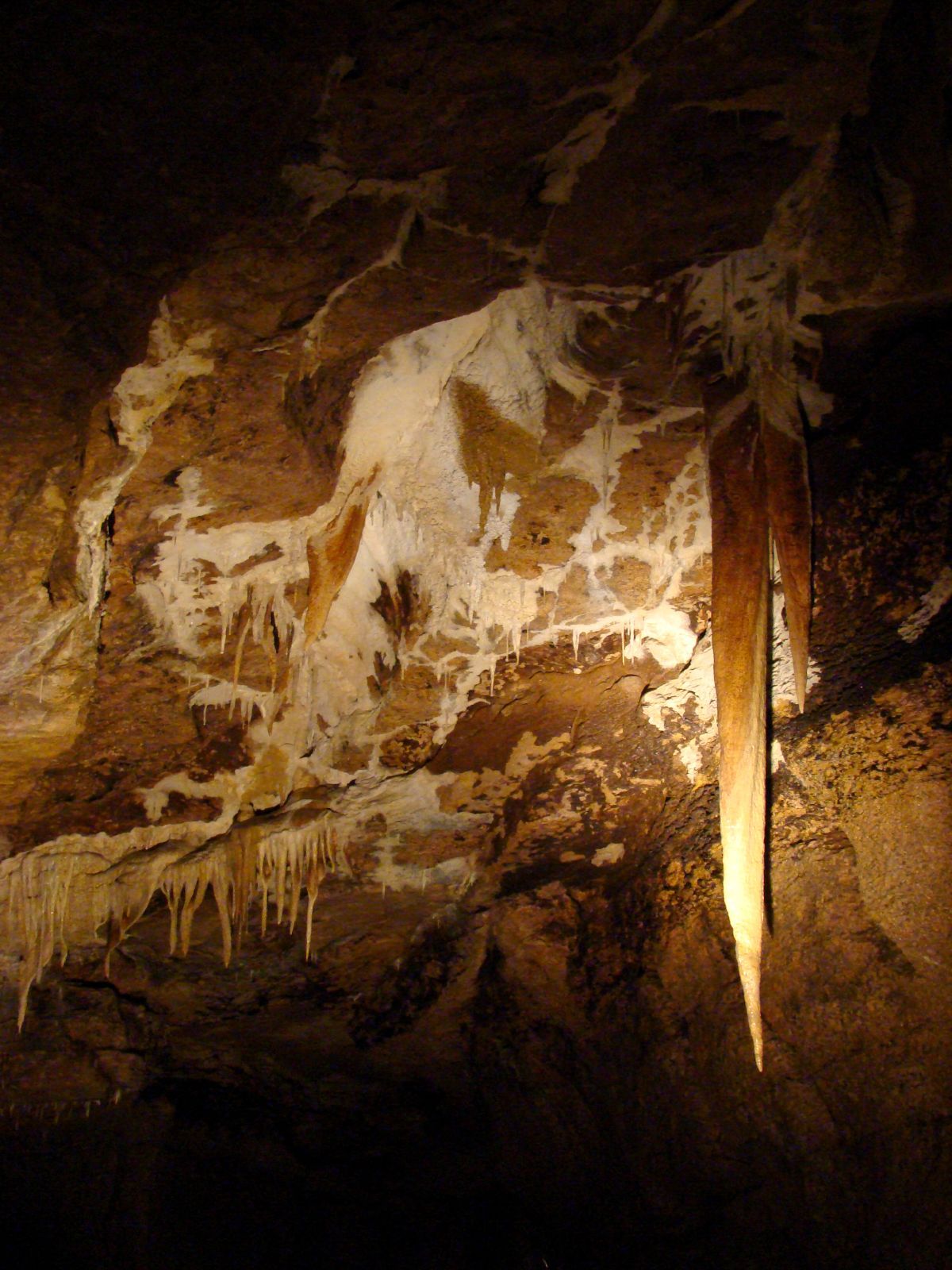
A large stalactite, nicknamed "Martel's" by show cave staff, was damaged by vandals before the attraction opened.

The cutting of turf has led to damage in the area. Extensive drainage in parts of the bog has damaged the bog's ability to retain water, resulting in flooding and abnormally high water levels in the caves downstream. This has impeded tourist activity in the past, notably in 1989 when the impact of such damage influencing cave water levels first became evident. As a protective measure, turf cutting has been banned within the wider Geopark. In addition more than 1200 small dams have been put in place across the bogland to slow water flow and encourage the growth of new bog.

Another problem is that human interference can cause the limestone to be damaged or eroded. In a particular case in 1984, a group of vandals broke into the show cave before it was opened to the public and threw stones at some of the calcite formations around the entrance. Many small stalactites were snapped off at their bases, while the tip of the largest stalactite in the show cave (over 2 metres [6.6 ft] in length) was broken off. This tip fell onto a sandbank on the cave floor where it was retrieved the next day by a workman. It was then sent to the Ulster Museum in Belfast where a calcite resin was specially produced and subsequently used to stick the tip back onto its original position.

== Resources ==
=== See also ===
- Cuilcagh Mountain Park
- Cladagh Glen Nature Reserve
- List of caves in the United Kingdom

=== Cited sources and further reading ===
- Jones, Gareth Ll.; Burns, Gaby; Fogg, Tim; Kelly, John (1997). The Caves of Fermanagh and Cavan (2nd Ed.). Lough Nilly Press. ISBN 0-9531602-0-3.
- Holgate, Hugh (December 1967). "Some Recent Discoveries in Marble Arch Caves". The Irish Caver: Irish Caving Club Newsletter. 2: 3–11.

=== External links ===
- Official web site for the Marble Arch Caves Global Geopark
- Marble Arch Caves Earth Science Conservation Review. (National Museums Northern Ireland)
- Map of the Marble Arch system (2010). Marble Arch Project.
- Original video footage from connection between Marble Arch and Prod's Pot/Cascades systems (2010). Marble Arch Project.
