= River Cladagh =

River in Northern Ireland, part of the Erne system

Cladagh River
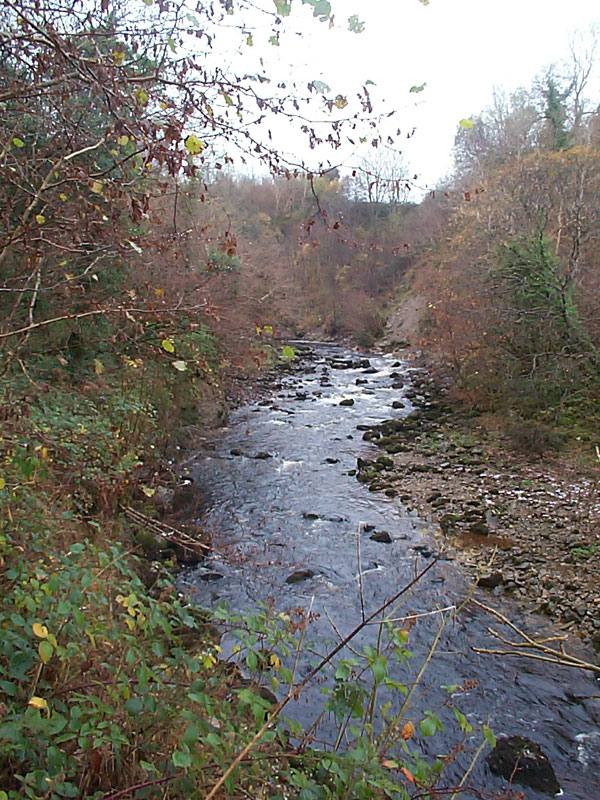
- Cladagh River flowing through Cladagh Glen
- Native name: an Chlaideach (Irish)

Location
- Country: United Kingdom
- State: Northern Ireland
- Region: Ulster
- County: County Fermanagh

Physical characteristics
- Source
  - location: Marble Arch Caves, County Fermanagh
  - coordinates: 54°15′36.464″N 7°48′48.744″W
  - elevation: 145 m (476 ft)
- Mouth: Arney River
  - coordinates: 54°17′10.73″N 7°47′29.19″W
  - elevation: 50 m (160 ft)
- Length: 4 km (2.5 mi)

The Cladagh River (from Irish an Chlaideach 'washing river') is a small river in County Fermanagh, formed from three rivers and a number of streams draining off the northern slopes of Cuilcagh mountain, which combine underground in the Marble Arch Cave system. On the surface, the River Cladagh emerges from one of the largest karst resurgences in the UK, before flowing through Cladagh Glen Nature Reserve and eventually draining into the Arney River.

== Course ==
=== Below ground ===
The river is sourced by three tributaries: the Sruh Croppa, the Aghinrawn and the Owenbrean; all of which sink into limestone on the Marlbank (a plateau on northern Cuilcagh Mountain) and join underground in the extensive Marble Arch cave system. The Sruh Croppa and Aghinrawn flow together for a short distance from Cradle Hole into Marble Arch Cave, before joining up with the Owenbrean at The Junction. In normal water levels, the Marble Arch Caves tour begins by boat, underground on the initial stretch of the Cladagh, and passes The Junction before continuing upstream along the Owenbrean.

=== Above ground ===
The main resurgence from the cave system pours from beneath a cliff face into the chaotic limestone collapse fields immediately above the Marble Arch, a natural limestone bridge which lends its name to the cave system. The Cladagh then cascades under the arch and turns abruptly north into the head of Cladagh River gorge, or Cladagh Glen.

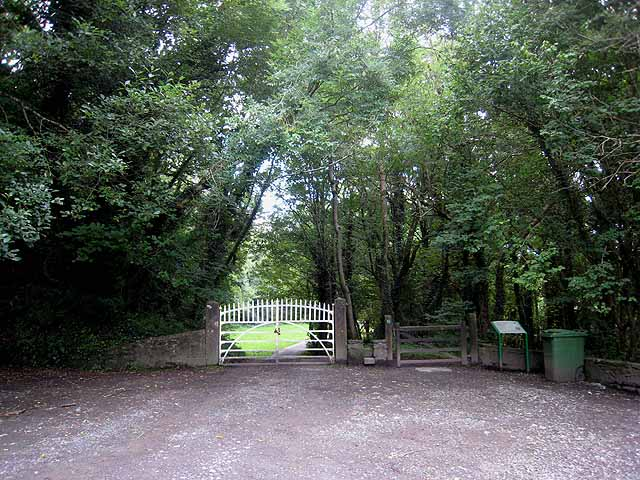
Parking area and entrance to Cladagh Glen, September 2008.

Halfway along Cladagh Glen, another large resurgence joins the Cladagh at Cascades Rising. This is the discharge for the Prod's Pot–Cascades Rising section of the Marble Arch Cave system, which takes water from a large catchment including Gortmaconnell (2 km), Brookfield (2.5 km) and more surprisingly Badger Pot and other East Cuilcagh sinks, 5.5 km away, as well as a portion of the Owenbrean River from small sinks upstream of its main sink at Pollasumera (Gunn, J.).

== Environment ==
This area is part of the Marble Arch Caves Global Geopark which includes Marlbank Forest, the Cladagh Glen and the Marble Arch National Nature Reserve. A loop from the Ulster Way traverses Cladagh Glen.

== See also ==
- List of rivers of Ireland
