= Calf House =

Portal tomb (dolmen) in County Cavan, Ireland

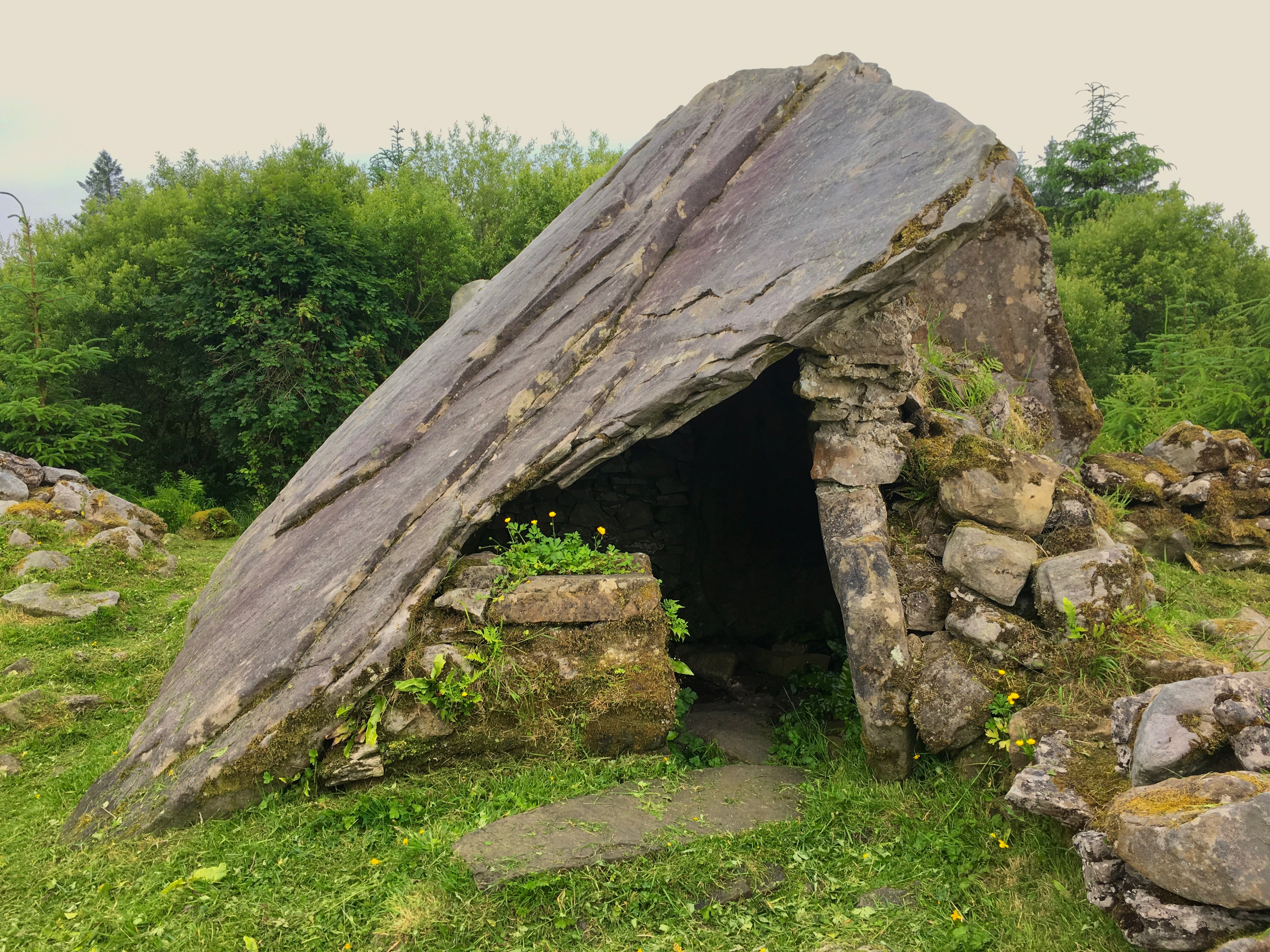
- Calf House in 2017
- Interactive map of Calf House
- 54.264866°N 7.885174°W
- Type: Tomb
- Location: County Cavan, Ireland

History
- Built: c. 2500 BC

Site notes
- Material: Stone

The Calf House or Druid's Altar is a portal tomb or dolmen in Burren Forest, County Cavan, Ireland. It dates from Neolithic times. It is located close to the Giant's Leap wedge tomb.
