= Trigonodon =

Scientific classification
- Domain: Eukaryota
- Kingdom: Animalia
- Phylum: Chordata
- Class: Actinopterygii
- Order: Tetraodontiformes
- Genus: †Trigonodon; Sismonda, 1847

Extinct genus of fishes

Trigonodon is an extinct genus of prehistoric ray-finned fish. Species include Trigonodon jugleri.

== See also ==
- Prehistoric fish
- List of prehistoric bony fish
