= Leitrim Group =

Rock strata occurring in Northern Ireland

- Stratigraphic range: Asbian to Arnsbergian, Carboniferous)
- Type: Group
- Unit of: Carboniferous Limestone Supergroup
- Sub-units: Lackagh Sandstone, Gowlaun Shale, Briscloonagh Sandstone, Dergvone Shale, Carraun Shale, Bellavally, Glenade Sandstone and Meenymore formations
- Overlies: Tyrone Group

Lithology
- Primary: sandstone
- Other: mudstone, conglomerate, shale, limestone, siltstone, breccia

Location
- Country: Northern Ireland
- Extent: County Fermanagh, County Tyrone

Type section
- Named for: County Leitrim

The Leitrim Group is a lithostratigraphical term coined to refer to the succession of rock strata which occur in Northern Ireland within the Visean and Namurian stages of the Carboniferous Period. The group disconformably overlies the Dartry Limestone of the Tyrone Group.

== Stratigraphy ==
The group comprises a series of shales and sandstones which in stratigraphic order (youngest/uppermost at top) are:

=== Lackagh Sandstone Formation ===
The formation is 60-90m thick in the Connaught Coalfield but only about 36m thick on Cuilcagh Mountain where it forms the prominent cliff-edged summit surface as also at Belmore. It is unfossiliferous.

=== Gowlaun Shale Formation ===
Some 50-60m thickness of shales and mudstones of Arnsbergian age constitute this formation.

=== Briscloonagh Sandstone Formation ===
About 53m of Pendleian age sandstones with interlayered siltstones and some mudstone make up this formation.

=== Dergvone Shale Formation ===
Mostly dark coloured iron-rich shales of Pendleian age, it reaches up to 128m thick. From its top downwards, it is divided into the Lacoon Sandstone, Killooman Shale, Tonlegee Shale, Tullyclevaun Shale, Black Mountain Shales and Gubaveeny Shale members.

=== Carraun Shale Formation ===
From 50m to over 160m thick, this Brigantian age formation is largely shale but contains thin limestones, siltstones and sandstones, some of which are given their own names as members e.g. the Doagh Limestone and Tawnyunshinagh Limestone members.

=== Bellavally Formation ===
This Asbian to Brigantian age formation varies from 45m to 80m thick and consists largely of sandstones and shales with lesser amounts of siltstone and limestone. From its top downwards, it is divided into the Corry, Sheena Shale, Glenkeel, Doobally Sandstone, Drummangarvagh, Lugasnaghta, Sraduffy, Larkfield and Tullyskeherny members.

=== Glenade Sandstone Formation ===
Referred to as the Yoredale Sandstone in the late nineteenth century, this Asbian age sequence varies from 4m thick in County Leitrim to as much as 350m in the north of its range. In places it sits directly on the Dartry Limestone where the Meenymore Formation rocks are missing due to the locally high relief of the underlying erosive surface. Animal fossils are almost wholly absent from this formation though fragments of Calamites and leaf remains are more common.

=== Meenymore Formation ===
The lowermost and hence oldest division of the Group is of Asbian age. It comprises mudstones and limestones and delta sandstones, two of which are mapped as separate ‘members’; the Glen and Quarry Sandstone, the former only being seen west of the Glen Syncline. The thickness of the formation varies from 18m at Doagh to 100m to the east of Cuilcagh Mountain. A depositional hiatus separates this formation from the underlying Dartry Limestone.
