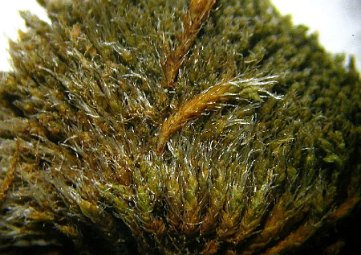

Scientific classification
- Kingdom: Plantae
- Division: Bryophyta
- Class: Bryopsida
- Subclass: Dicranidae
- Order: Grimmiales
- Family: Grimmiaceae
- Genus: Coscinodon
- Species: C. lawianus

Binomial name
- Coscinodon lawianus (J.H.Willis) Ochyra

Synonyms
- Grimmia lawiana J.H.Willis

= Coscinodon lawianus =

Species of moss

Coscinodon lawianus is a species of moss in the family Grimmiaceae endemic to East Antarctica. It is one of only two species of moss found only in continental Antarctica (alongside Bryum bharatiense), out of 23 species found on the continent. It is found on exposed rocks on nunataks and oases scattered across the region, stretching from Queen Maud Land to Princess Elizabeth Land. Initially described as part of the genus Grimmia, it was reclassified into Coscinodon by Polish bryologist Ryszard Ochyra in 2004, owing to similarities with several South American species. C. lawianus is likely a remnant of the Neogene flora of Antarctica which survived the rampant glaciation and cooling of the continent on remote rocky outcrops.

== Taxonomy ==
In 1966, Coscinodon lawianus was initially described as Grimmia lawiana by Australian botanist James Hamlyn Willis, named in honor of Australian Antarctic research director Philip G. Law. The description was made with samples from the Mawson Coast of Mac. Robertson Land collected in 1954. Its holotype was catalogued at the National Herbarium of Victoria.

The moss's biplicate leaves (having two lengthwise folds) are unlike the other species of Grimmia. It is especially dissimilar to subantarctic and South American species of Grimmia; this led the Polish bryologist Ryszard Ochyra to reclassify the moss into the genus Coscinodon (within the same family, Grimmiaceae) in 2004, during work on the Illustrated Moss Flora of Antarctica. Ochyra cited the moss's similarities to South American coscinodons C. pseudocribrosus and C. bolivianus as supporting the reclassification.

== Description ==
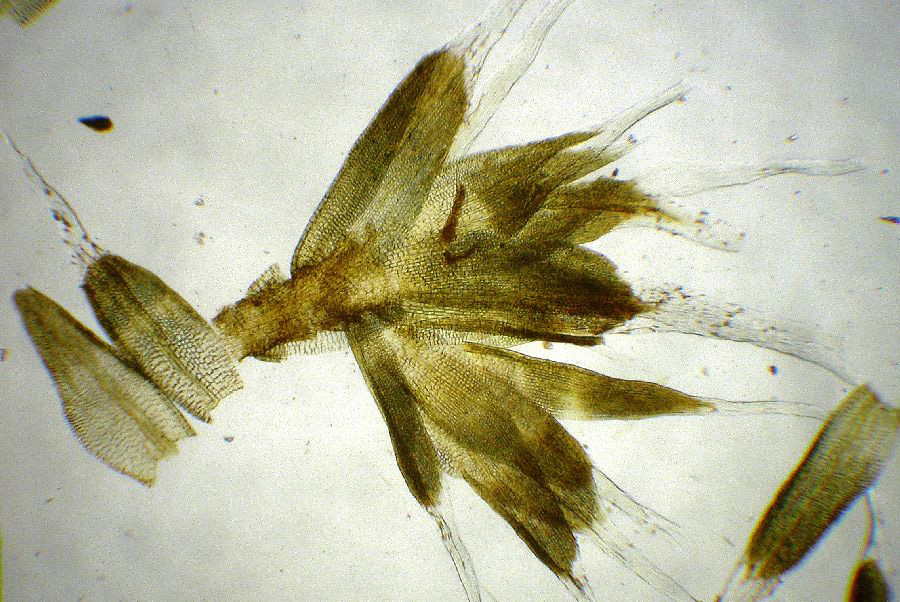
C. lawianus leaves and stem under a microscope

All populations of C. lawianus are sterile, reproducing solely through asexual reproduction, spreading through filamentous gemmae. This limited reproduction has limited its range in comparison to more fecund Antarctic moss species such as Sarconeurum glaciale, which were able to spread into ice-free regions of West Antarctica. As female plants have been observed, it is likely dioicous. It forms the main component of polyspecific associations when growing with other mosses. Associations with Ceratodon purpureus and Ptychostomum pseudotriquetrum have been observed. The sporophytes of the moss have not been observed.

C. lawianus forms dense cushions which occasionally coalesce into larger mats. The upper surface of the moss is olive green, while the lower portions are dark brown. The individual stems, thin and with infrequent branches, are generally 0.5–1.5 cm (0.2–0.6 in) tall, although they can sometimes reach heights up to 3.5 cm (1 in). Its rhizoids are smooth and light-brown in color. The moss has sparse amounts of thin and translucent axillary hairs. It has a dense, overlapping distribution of oval-shaped leaves, 0.7–0.9 mm (0.03–0.04 in) long and 0.25–0.6 mm (0.01–0.02 in) wide. These are characteristically biplicate and generally pointed, with a sharp central fold along the middle on the distal portion; their undersides are smooth and concave. The leaves feature translucent awns that reach two-thirds of the length of the overall lamina on the uppermost leaves.

== Distribution ==
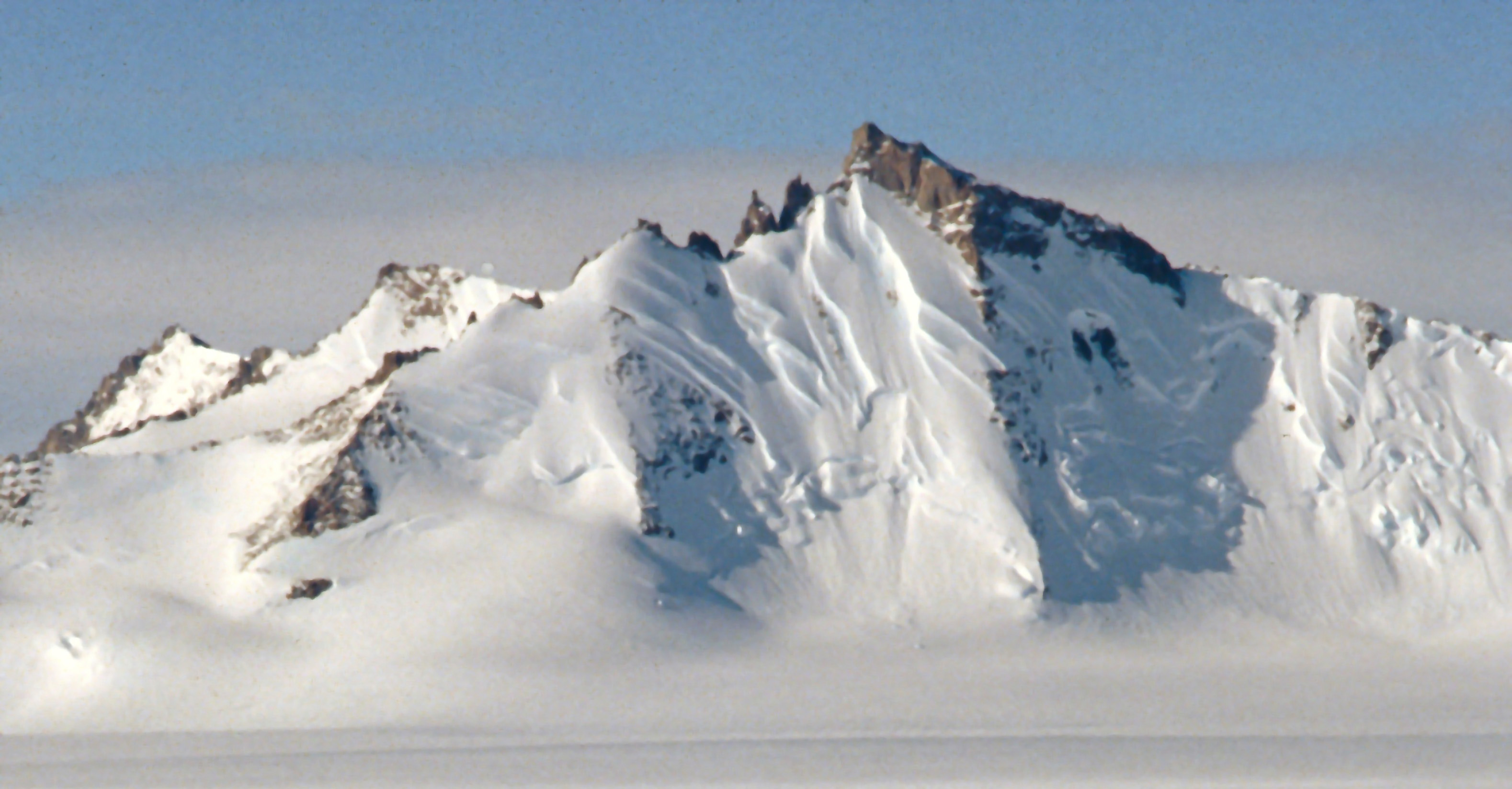
C. lawianus has been found on nunataks as far south as the Tottan Hills of Queen Maud Land.

Although relatively rare, C. lawianus is spread across much of East Antarctica, where it is present on nunataks and Antarctic oases. It is found in Queen Maud Land, Mac. Robertson Land and portions of coastal Enderby Land and Princess Elizabeth Land. It was initially attested only in the northern portion of the Prince Charles Mountains, but specimens collected during an early 2000s biological expedition extended its range to the Mawson Escarpment in the southern portion of the range. The southernmost known colonies have been found at the Tottan Hills of Queen Maud Land, at a latitude of 75 degrees south. It is one of two species of moss endemic to (only found in) continental Antarctica, alongside Bryum bharatiense; this is out of a total of twenty-three moss species found in continental Antarctica. Eleven species of moss are endemic to the Antarctic overall, including the Antarctic islands, out of 130 species attested in this region. It grows at elevations as low as 20–30 m (70–100 ft) in coastal Enderby Land and Mac. Robertson Land, but has been found as high as 1,650–2,160 m (5,000–7,000 ft) above sea level in the Tottan Hills.

C. lawianus is likely a remnant of the diverse Antarctic flora of the Paleogene, when the climate was relatively warm. This ecosystem was destroyed by rampant cooling and glaciation on the continent during the Neogene, leaving the moss isolated on the rocky outcrops and nunataks. An Arctic species in the same genus, C. hartzii, shares a similar distribution to C. lawianus on the opposite hemisphere, colonizing small, scattered regions of Greenland and the High Arctic.

=== Habitat ===
The moss grows in cracks and crevices of acidic rocks. It prefers high-altitude soils with low levels of nutrients, avoiding areas directly adjacent to the coast with significant sea bird presence. Although generally growing in dry environments, colonies have been found growing adjacent to meltwater streams and ponds. The moss forms a habitat for colonies of mites and other tiny invertebrates. The microscopic filamentous fungi Cladosporium, Epicoccum nigrum, Phoma herbarum, and Thelebolus microsporus have been observed growing within samples of C. lawianus.
