= Bucklandiella elegans =

Scientific classification
- Kingdom: Plantae
- Division: Bryophyta
- Class: Bryopsida
- Subclass: Dicranidae
- Order: Grimmiales
- Family: Grimmiaceae
- Genus: Bucklandiella
- Species: B. elegans

Binomial name
- Bucklandiella elegans (Müll. Hal.) Bedn.-Ochyra & Ochyra, 2010

Synonyms
- Racomitrium elegans (Müll. Hal.) Paris

Species of moss

Bucklandiella elegans is a species of moss in the family Grimmiaceae. It is found in New Zealand.
