= Seligeria oelandica =

Scientific classification
- Kingdom: Plantae
- Division: Bryophyta
- Class: Bryopsida
- Subclass: Dicranidae
- Order: Grimmiales
- Family: Seligeriaceae
- Genus: Seligeria
- Species: S. oelandica

Binomial name
- Seligeria oelandica C.Jens. & Medel.

Species of moss

Seligeria oelandica, the Irish rock-bristle, is a rare species of moss in the family Seligeriaceae, occurring on wet calcareous rock faces. It predominantly exists across two sites: Benbulbin in Ireland and Craig y Cilau in the Brecon Beacons.

== Characteristics ==
Seligeria oelandica forms small shoots which are between 5–15 mm tall and black in colour. They are often encrusted with calcareous deposits. Its leaves are approximately 1 mm long and ovate-lanceolate at the base, tapering to a long and blunt subula.

The species can be recognised due to its stout seta and wide-mouthed capsule, which become short when dry. The lid remains attached to the columella and a peristome is present. The spores typically measure from 22–30 μm.

Seligeria oelandica is autoicous (sexes on different branches of same plant) and it is also perennial, with its capsules maturing in the summer.

== History ==
Seligeria oelandica was first described from Northern Europe, with early records originating in Sweden, Norway and Svalbard. It was then later discovered in Switzerland, Russia, Canada and the Carpathian Mountains.

In Ireland, the species was first registered in 1962, in the Counties of Leitrim and Sligo. It was then discovered in Northern Ireland in 2000 at the Cliffs of Magho, County Fermanagh. In 2009, the species was then unexpectedly found in Wales on a singular rock face at Craig y Cilau.
