= Leucoperichaetium eremophilum =

Conservation status
- Vulnerable (IUCN 2.3)

Scientific classification
- Kingdom: Plantae
- Division: Bryophyta
- Class: Bryopsida
- Subclass: Dicranidae
- Order: Grimmiales
- Family: Grimmiaceae
- Genus: Leucoperichaetium
- Species: L. eremophilum

Binomial name
- Leucoperichaetium eremophilum Magill

Species of moss

Leucoperichaetium eremophilum is a species of moss in the family Grimmiaceae that is endemic to Namibia. It is considered a vulnerable species.

== Distribution and habitat ==
L. eremophilum is known only from the type location in Witpütz, Namibia, where it can be found growing on quartzite outcrops in dwarf succulent shrubland.

== Description ==
L. eremophilum plants are small, blackish-green in colour, and grow in irregular patches. The stems grow upright, often branching, and measure 5–10 mm (0.20–0.39 in) long, though much of that length may be buried. The leaves are oblong-acuminate, each measuring 0.8–1.2 mm (0.031–0.047 in) long, with a pointed, translucent tip and smooth, toothless margins.

== Conservation status ==
L. eremophilum is listed as vulnerable by the International Union for Conservation of Nature under criterion D2, based on its extremely limited distribution. The single location at which L. eremophilum is present is threatened by habitat degradation resulting from mining activity in the area.
