= Schistidium poeltii =

Scientific classification
- Kingdom: Plantae
- Division: Bryophyta
- Class: Bryopsida
- Subclass: Dicranidae
- Order: Grimmiales
- Family: Grimmiaceae
- Genus: Schistidium
- Species: S. poeltii

Binomial name
- Schistidium poeltii H.H.Blom

Species of moss

Schistidium poeltii is a species of moss found in the Arctic. It is native to northern regions of Europe (Finland, Sweden, Norway), Greenland, and north-eastern Canada by sea.
