= Dryptodon (plant) =

Scientific classification
- Kingdom: Plantae
- Division: Bryophyta
- Class: Bryopsida
- Subclass: Dicranidae
- Order: Grimmiales
- Family: Grimmiaceae
- Genus: Dryptodon; Brid.

Genus of mosses

Dryptodon is a genus of mosses belonging to the family Grimmiaceae.

The genus has almost cosmopolitan distribution.

Species:

- Dryptodon austrofunalis (Müll.Hal.) Ochyra & Żarnowiec
- Dryptodon brachydictyon (Cardot) Ochyra & Żarnowiec
