= Schistidium antarctici =

Scientific classification
- Kingdom: Plantae
- Division: Bryophyta
- Class: Bryopsida
- Subclass: Dicranidae
- Order: Grimmiales
- Family: Grimmiaceae
- Genus: Schistidium
- Species: S. antarctici

Binomial name
- Schistidium antarctici (Cardot) L. Savic. & Smirn

Synonyms
- Grimmia antarctici Cardot; Grimmia antarctici var. percompacta E.B. Bartram; Grimmia antarctici var. antarctici

Species of moss

Schistidium antarctici is a species of moss found in Antarctica and subantarctic islands. It can be found in compact clumps or as continuous beds of moss. It is quite variable in color from brown to dark green. It grows on both soil and rocks, but reproduces more often when growing on rocks.

In the Windmill Islands area of Wilkes Land, Schistidium antarctici is the most common bryophyte. If its habitat supplies ample moisture, it may form a "carpet-like" growth, but if its habitat is dry, it forms a short "cushion-like" growth.

== Description ==
Schistidium antarctici is a small to medium sized moss. It can form dense or loose cushions and is often found in large patches. The overall color can be brown, reddish-brown, somewhat olive green, dark-green, in between any of these shades. Their stems are 0.3 to 5.5 centimeters tall and have many parallel upward growing branches. Its root-like rhizoids are dark to light brown. They are scattered on the lower part of the stem or can have almost none.

The leaves are tightly packed in three or four spiral rows at the ends of the stems. When dry they tightly overlap and are erect, but when wet they are more spreading. The shape of leaves is ovate, ovate-triangular, ovate-lanceolate, oblong-lanceolate, or lanceolate. They can measure 0.8 to 2.9 millimeters long. The three or four rows of leaves give shoots a ridged look.

Each capsule of the moss produces between 250,000 and 520,000 spores, each 9.3 μm in diameter and with a volume of 143 μm^{3}.

== Taxonomy ==
Schistidium antarctici was scientifically described and named Grimmia antarctici by Jules Cardot in 1906. In 1965 it was reclassified into the genus Schistidium by Lydia Ivanovna Savicz-Lubitskaya and Zoë Nikolayevna Smirnova giving the species its accepted name. It is classified as part of the family Grimmiaceae.

== Range and habitat ==
Schistidium antarctici is widespread in Antarctica and is endemic, limited to just one geographic area, to the botanical continent of Antarctica. It grows on all parts of the Antarctic Peninsula and the nearby Alexander Island and South Shetland Islands. In West Antarctica it is found on the Eights Coast and Marie Byrd Land. In Eastern Antarctica it is found in the western parts of Queen Maud Land, coastal areas of Mac. Robertson Land, on Gaussberg and the nearby Bunger Hills, the offshore Windmill Islands, Victoria Land and Cape Hallett. It also is part of the flora of the South Orkney Islands, South Sandwich Islands and South Georgia far off shore and the very isolated Bouvet Island. However, though found on South Georgia it is quite rare there. The southernmost part of its range is 83°49'S in southern Victoria Land. It can be found between sea level to a maximum of 1379 meters in East Antarctica, though almost all records are at less than 200 meters.

The three dominant Antarctic mosses, the two others are the non-endemic Bryum pseudotriquetrum and Ceratodon purpureus, are found in ice free areas especially in areas of the coasts where penguin colonies or other nesting birds provide nutrients to establish healthy moss beds. It can be found in both dry and wet habitats and can colonize both sheltered and exposed sites. It is frequently found on rock faces, ledges, and stony outcrops, but also will grow on soil though it is seldom fertile when growing in soil.

== Ecology ==
The Flora of Antarctica is very sparse and dominated by the mosses such as Schistidium antarctici. Unfortunately the changing environment on the continent is not favorable for the species, it suffers much more from increased UV radiation due to the ozone hole over the polar area than other more widespread species. In maritime areas of Antarctica it fruits frequently, but it is very rarely fertile when on soil. It will reproduce vegetatively when further inland.
