= Grimmia plagiopodia =

Scientific classification
- Kingdom: Plantae
- Division: Bryophyta
- Class: Bryopsida
- Subclass: Dicranidae
- Order: Grimmiales
- Family: Grimmiaceae
- Genus: Grimmia
- Species: G. plagiopodia

Binomial name
- Grimmia plagiopodia Hedw.

Synonyms
- List: Grimmia argentea R. (Hedw.); Grimmia arvernica Philib.; Grimmia brandegei Aust.; Grimmia nivea Dus.; Grimmia obtusa Brid.; Grimmia plagiopus Spreng.; Grimmia plagiopodia var. antarctica Bart.

Species of moss

Grimmia plagiopodia is a species of moss in the family Grimmiaceae. It was first described by Johann Hedwig in 1801 in his book 'Species muscorum frondosorum'.

== Description ==
Grimmia plagiopodia forms dense, rounded cushions that are dark green to brown. Its stems are short (3-5mm), with crowded, broadly ovate to oblong leaves that are deeply concave. The leaf nerve is weak, while the long, hyaline (translucent) awns are rough, irregularly toothed and often branched one or more times.

The basal leaf cells are quadrate to short-rectangular, extending from the costa to the leaf margin, with smooth cell walls. The seta is very short and curved (0.2-0.3mm), supporting an immersed, nearly sessile capsule that is swollen on one side at the base. The capsule wall consists of thin-walled cells and lacks an annulus. The operculum is conical with a short beak, and the peristome is fully developed, with pale-yellow teeth that split towards its apex.

The spores are around 12 µm in diameter. The species is autocious, meaning that male and female reproductive organs occur in separate clusters on the same plant.

== Distribution and habitat ==
Grimmia plagiopodia has a bipolar, sparse distribution (present only in temperate and cold regions); being widespread in the Northern Hemisphere, particularly in Europe and North America, but rare in the Southern Hemisphere, where it occurs in New Zealand’s South Island and sparsely in Antarctica. It grows across a broad elevation range of around 50-2400m, often spotted in meadow or prairie-like sites.

The species is observed to favour sun exposed habitats and is rarely found in shaded locations. For the most part, its relative absence from cemented and eutrophic surfaces as substrates implies a preference for base-rich and porous rocks including calcareous sandstone, andesitic, iron-rich rocks, and limestone.

The conservation status of Grimmia plagiopodia has been assessed as vulnerable by the IUCN. In addition to its rarity, the species faces various location specific threats.

For example, in Germany, populations have declined due to urban expansion and scrub encroachment associated with changes in land management practices. In South Island, rock climbing is considered a threat as plants are trampled on or dislodged by ropes.

== Taxonomy ==
Grimmia plagiopodia may be confused with Grimmia anodon due to similarities in overall morphology.

== External sources ==
- Hedwig, J. (1801). Species Muscorum Frondosorum, p. 78, pl. 15, figs. 6–13
