= Seligeria carniolica =

Conservation status
- Endangered (IUCN 3.1)

Scientific classification
- Kingdom: Plantae
- Division: Bryophyta
- Class: Bryopsida
- Subclass: Dicranidae
- Order: Grimmiales
- Family: Seligeriaceae
- Genus: Seligeria
- Species: S. carniolica

Binomial name
- Seligeria carniolica (Breidl. & Beck) Nyholm

Synonyms
- Trochobryum carniolicum Bredl. & Beck

Species of moss

Seligeria carniolica (water rock-bristle moss) is a species of moss in the family Seligeriaceae. It is considered globally rare.

== History ==
Seligeria carniolica (formerly Trochobryum carniolicum) was first discovered in northern Slovenia (then Carniolia) and described in 1885. It has subsequently been reported from a few other sites in Switzerland, Norway, Sweden, Britain and five regions of France. It appears to be endemic to a few parts of Europe.

It was first found in Britain in Scotland near Newcastleton in Roxburghshire by Evelyn M. Lobley in 1948, identified by E. F. Warburg among other moss specimens of the same genus that she had collected. Subsequent visits to the area by Lobley and others did not locate further specimens. However, Lobley found it at another site, in Northumberland in 1964, where it was subsequently studied by other bryologists. It was assessed as Critically Endangered in Britain in 2001. In 2014, it was re-found at several locations near the original Scottish site, and many further sites were identified in Northumberland in 2018. With this additional information about its distribution, it may be appropriate to change its conservation status in Britain to Near Threatened or even Least Concern, provided its specific habitat is maintained.

== Characteristics ==
The plants are very small, a few millimetres high, and brownish in colour. The plants grows in patches. Lower leaves are small and lanceolate while the upper ones are much longer. This moss reproduces sexually from spores. The reproductive structure has a thick, reddish stalk and the spore capsule is a flared trumpet shape. It can also produce protonemal gemmae, a means of asexual reproduction, when cultivated in the laboratory, although these have not been seen in the field.

== Ecology ==
Seligeria carniolica has been found in two types of habitat, both relying on water courses in limestone rock where the moss can be regularly submerged. In France the moss grows among calcite crystals that have formed on water-worn limestone outcrops. In Norway and Britain it has been found on limestone or other calcareous rocks in shaded streams where it can be regularly submerged. It can survive in small, isolated populations which can expand after the weather has cleaned rocks of other mosses.
