= Seligeria pusilla =

Conservation status
- Apparently Secure (NatureServe)

Scientific classification
- Kingdom: Plantae
- Division: Bryophyta
- Class: Bryopsida
- Subclass: Dicranidae
- Order: Grimmiales
- Family: Seligeriaceae
- Genus: Seligeria
- Species: S. pusilla

Binomial name
- Seligeria pusilla (Hedw.) Bruch & Schimp.

Species of moss

Seligeria pusilla, the dwarf rock‑bristle, is a minute species of moss in the family Seligeriaceae. It grows on shaded calcareous rock surfaces, typically forming thin, bristly mats on cliffs, ravines and boulders. The species can be found scattered across northern and temperate regions of Europe, Asia and North America.

== Distribution ==
Seligeria pusilla is widespread but uncommon, and is found predominantly across several areas of Canada and the US, including Ellesmere Island, Alaska, Arkansas, Minnesota, Tennessee, Indiana, Iowa, Kentucky, Michigan, Missouri, Ohio, Pennsylvania, Vermont and Wisconsin.

In Europe, the species is found from the British Isles eastwards to the Ural Mountains. There are additional records of the moss existing in Turkey, Central Asia, Mongolia and Japan.

In Britain and Ireland, it grows on shaded rocks such as limestone, basalt and calcareous sandstone. It is most frequent in upland gullies, ravines and limestone outrcops.

It has an altitudinal range of 30–590 m (100–1,935 ft).

== Characteristics ==
This specific moss type is minute, with shoots ranging from 2 to 3 mm (0.08 to 0.12 in) tall and light green in colour. The leaves are linear in shape and sharply pointed. They are sometimes slightly widened at the base, gradually narrowing to a slender tip. The leaf margins range from entire to slightly crenulate.

Spores measure approximately 10–13 μm.

== Ecology ==
The species grows on shaded, moist but not saturated calcareous rock surfaces, including limestone, basalt and base‑rich sandstone. It is known to occupy crevices, recesses, overhangs and boulders, often in wooded ravines or sheltered gullies.

Seligeria pusilla is autoicous (sexes on different branches of same plant), reaching maturity in summer.
