= Schistidium spinosum =

Conservation status
- Critically Endangered (IUCN 3.1)

Scientific classification
- Kingdom: Plantae
- Division: Bryophyta
- Class: Bryopsida
- Subclass: Dicranidae
- Order: Grimmiales
- Family: Grimmiaceae
- Genus: Schistidium
- Species: S. spinosum

Binomial name
- Schistidium spinosum H.H.Blom & Lüth
- It is native to Austria, France, Germany, and Switzerland

Species of moss

Schistidium spinosum, also known as Dorniges Rotkäppchenmoos in German or Fendillette épineuse in French, is a very rare species of moss in the family Grimmiaceae native to Austria, France, Germany, and Switzerland. It is threatened with extinction.

== Description ==
Schistidium spinosum is a small, olive-green moss that forms round cushions or tufts. The individual plants have orange-red, strongly branched, 0.50–1.35 cm long stems. The epidermis is composed of 1–2 rows of thick-walled cells. The imbricate, smooth, erect, straight, narrowly ovate-lanceolate to ovate-triangular, 1.45–2.20(–2.50) mm long, and 0.30–0.60(–0.70) mm wide leaves are arranged in distinct spiral rows.

== Taxonomy ==
It was described by Hans H. Blom and Michael Lüth in 2002. The type specimen was collected on the 14 December 1998 by Michael Lüth in a rock quarry in the Yachtal by Elzach, Black Forest, Baden-Württemberg, Germany at an elevation of 600 m above sea level.

=== Etymology ===
The specific epithet spinosum means thorny or prickly.

== Distribution and habitat ==
It is native to Austria, France, Germany, and Switzerland, where it grows on siliceous rocks in hill and mountain areas at elevations of 450–2300 m above sea level. It colonises surfaces that have been exposed to the elements for at least 50–100 years.

== Conservation ==
It is a critically endangered species with less than 250 individual-equivalents (= 1 m^{2} on which the species grows) restricted to about 20 locations with an estimated area of occupancy of 80 km^{2}. In Switzerland, it is critically endangered and only known from 2 locations. In Germany, it is categorised as data deficient but the populations in Thuringia and Bavaria have experienced a sharp decline. A project focussing on the conservation of Schistidium spinosum was started by the State Museum of Natural History Stuttgart.
