= Jaffueliobryum arsenei =

Conservation status
- Endangered (IUCN 2.3)

Scientific classification
- Kingdom: Plantae
- Division: Bryophyta
- Class: Bryopsida
- Subclass: Dicranidae
- Order: Grimmiales
- Family: Ptychomitriaceae
- Genus: Jaffueliobryum
- Species: J. arsenei

Binomial name
- Jaffueliobryum arsenei (Thér.) Thér.

Synonyms
- Coscinodon arsenei Thér.

Species of moss

Jaffueliobryum arsenei is a species of moss in the family Ptychomitriaceae.

It is endemic to Querétaro and Zacatecas states in Mexico.

It is an Endangered species, threatened by habitat loss.
