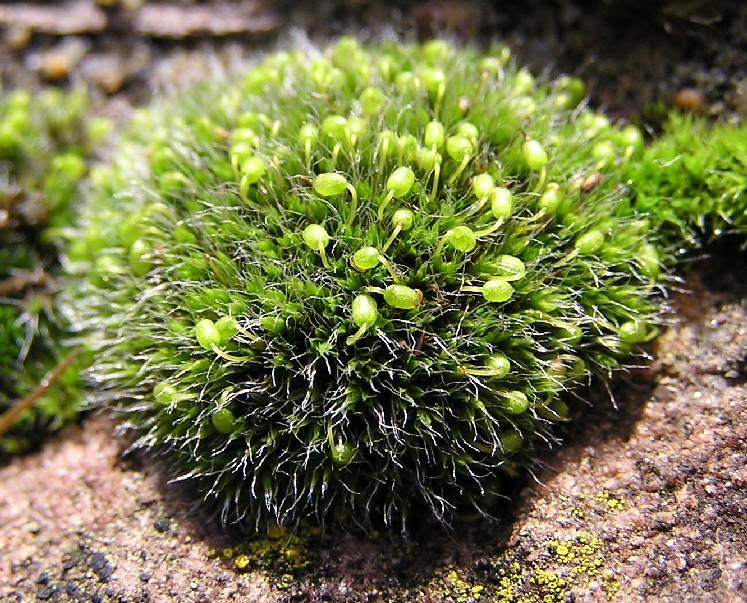
- Grimmia pulvinata

Scientific classification
- Kingdom: Plantae
- Division: Bryophyta
- Class: Bryopsida
- Subclass: Dicranidae
- Order: Grimmiales
- Family: Grimmiaceae
- Genus: Grimmia; Hedw.

= Grimmia =

Genus of mosses

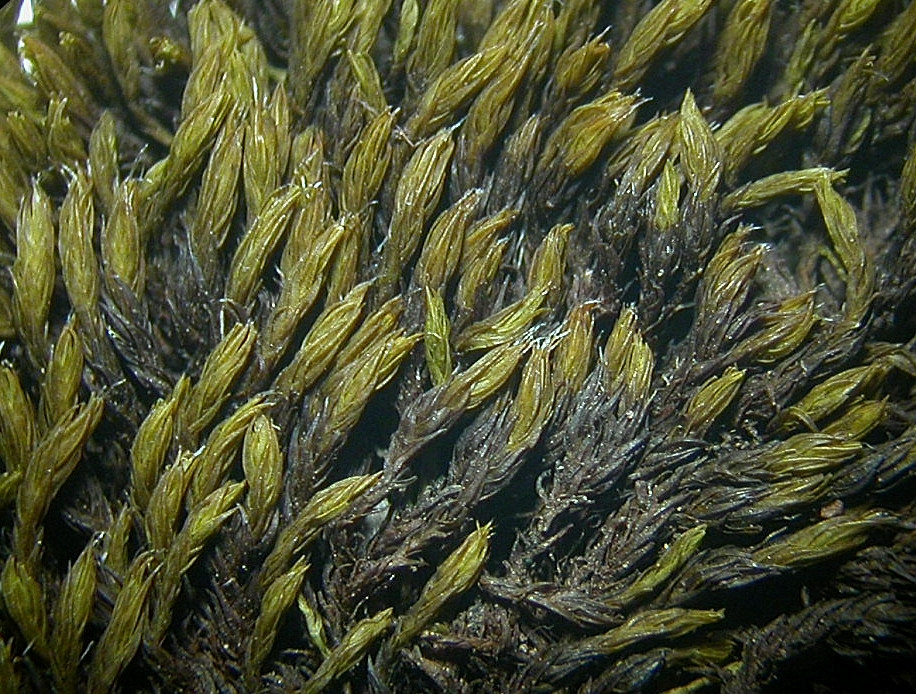
Grimmia dissimulata habit dry 2009-01-29

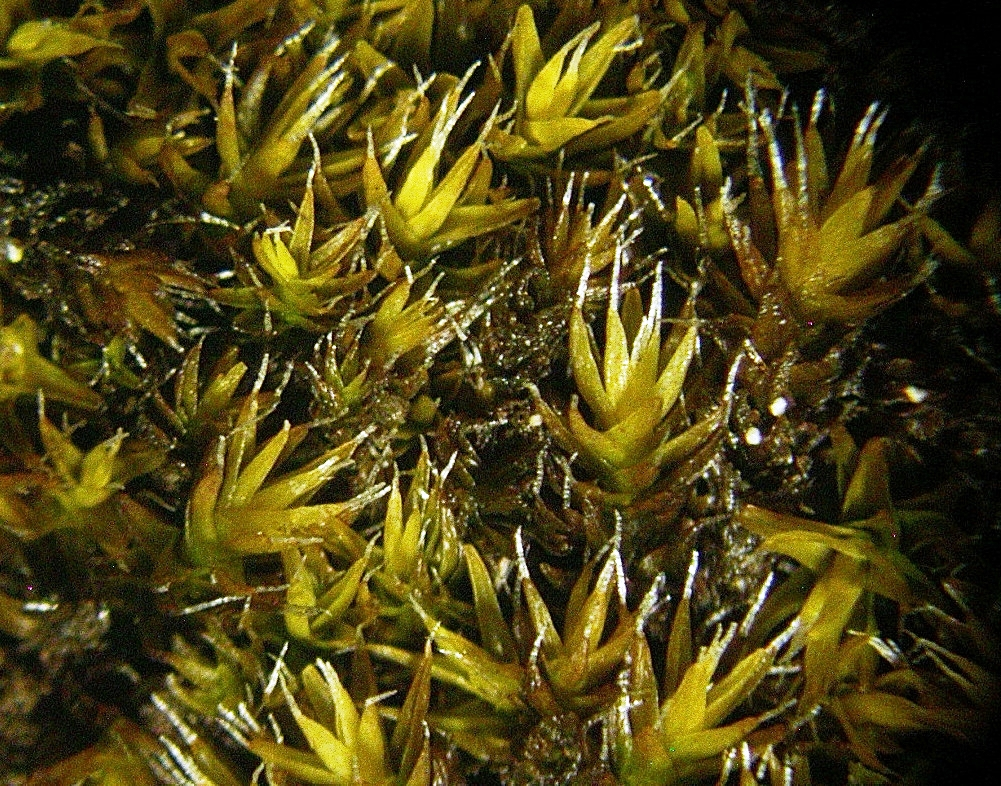
Grimmia maido habit moist 2008-11-08

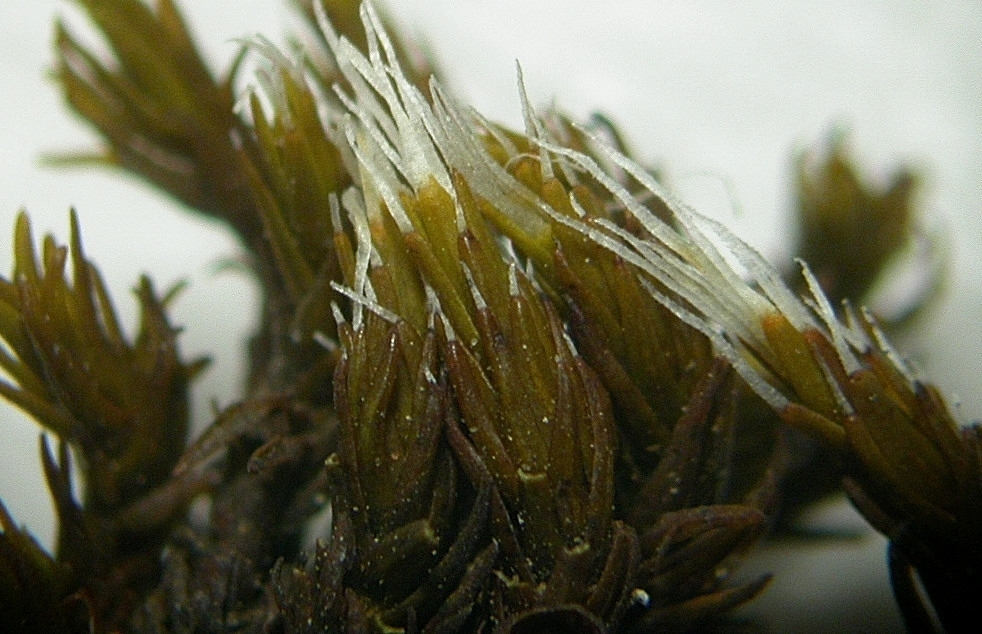
Grimmia torenii habit dry 2008-11-07

Grimmia is a genus of mosses, originally named by Jakob Friedrich Ehrhart in honour of Johann Friedrich Carl Grimm, a physician and botanist from Gotha, Germany.

== Geographic distribution ==
Although predominantly occurring in the moderate zones, representatives of the cosmopolitan genus Grimmia may be found in all parts of the world, from Alaska to the most southern point of Chile, and from Siberia to South Africa, though in tropic regions, e.g. Hawaii and Indonesia. Grimmia species can only be found at high altitudes, mainly mountains.

== Identification ==
Grimmia is a notoriously difficult genus in terms of identification, and in the majority of herbaria a considerable number of species was found misidentified. The American bryologist Geneva Sayre (1911–1992), who worked for many years on a monograph of the North American Grimmias, indicated in an original way these difficulties, as she said: "it contains an ambigua, a varia, a decipiens, a controversa, a revisa and at least two anomalas".

== Publications ==
In the Index Muscorum, the genus Grimmia is represented with 800 names of published species. As since Loeske (1930), no revision of the European species had been carried out.

The Dutch bryologist H. C. Greven started in 1990 with Grimmia fieldwork and a revision of the Grimmia collections from important European herbaria. The results were published in "Grimmia Hedw. (Grimmiaceae, Musci) in Europe".

After examining the Grimmia collections from herbaria in North- and South America, South Africa, Australia and New Zealand, and about 50 Grimmia collecting trips in all continents, Grimmias of the World was published. An important contribution was the revision of Grimmia in North America.

In the past decades, some more bryologists became interested in the genus Grimmia. Jesús Muñoz published a herbaria revision of Grimmia in Latin America, and Maier studied herbarium specimens of Grimmia from the Himalaya.

== Classification ==
The genus Grimmia contains the following species:

- Grimmia abyssinica (Müll. Hal.) A. Jaeger
- Grimmia acuta (Hedw.) F. Weber & D. Mohr
- Grimmia afroincurva Broth.
- Grimmia ahmadiana Nog.
- Grimmia albida (Hedw.) F. Weber & D. Mohr
- Grimmia alpestris (F. Weber & D. Mohr) Schleich.
- Grimmia alpestris x donniana Chal.
- Grimmia ambigua (Sull.) Sull.
- Grimmia amblyophylla Müll. Hal.
- Grimmia americana E.B. Bartram
- Grimmia andina Mitt.
- Grimmia angustissima P. de la Varde
- Grimmia anodon Bruch & Schimp.
- Grimmia anomala Hampe
- Grimmia antipodum Müll. Hal.
- Grimmia aquatica (Brid. ex Schrad.) Müll. Hal.
- Grimmia arctica (Müll. Hal.) A. Jaeger
- Grimmia arcuata De Not.
- Grimmia arenaria Hampe
- Grimmia argyrotricha Müll. Hal.
- Grimmia arizonae Renauld & Cardot
- Grimmia atrata Miel. ex Hornsch.
- Grimmia attenuata (Müll. Hal. & Kindb.) Kindb.
- Grimmia australis (Dixon & Sainsbury) J. Muñoz & Ochyra
- Grimmia austrofunalis Müll. Hal.
- Grimmia austroleucophaea Besch.
- Grimmia basaltica Mitt.
- Grimmia bicolor Herzog
- Grimmia boliviana (Broth.) F.J. Herm.
- Grimmia boschbergiana Müll. Hal.
- Grimmia brachydictyon (Cardot) Deguchi
- Grimmia brachypus Müll. Hal.
- Grimmia breviseta (Lindb.) Lindb. & Arnell
- Grimmia brittoniae R.S. Williams
- Grimmia browniana (Dicks.) Sm.
- Grimmia brownii Paris
- Grimmia caespiticia (Brid.) Jur.
- Grimmia caffra Rehmann ex Müll. Hal.
- Grimmia calcarea (Hedw.) F. Weber & D. Mohr
- Grimmia calycina Herzog
- Grimmia camonia Rota
- Grimmia campylotricha Müll. Hal.
- Grimmia canariensis (H. Winter) Broth.
- Grimmia capillata De Not.
- Grimmia chocayae (Herzog) Broth.
- Grimmia chrysoneura Müll. Hal.
- Grimmia chubutensis Cardot & Broth.
- Grimmia churchilliana H.A. Crum
- Grimmia cirrata (Hedw.) F. Weber & D. Mohr
- Grimmia coarctata Müll. Hal.
- Grimmia compactula Müll. Hal.
- Grimmia controversa (Hedw.) F. Weber & D. Mohr
- Grimmia crassifolia Lindb. ex Broth.
- Grimmia crassinervia (Müll. Hal.) Macoun & Kindb.
- Grimmia cratericola Sakurai & Takaki
- Grimmia crinita Brid.
- Grimmia crinitoleucophaea Cardot
- Grimmia crispata (Hedw.) Spreng.
- Grimmia crispipila (Taylor) Müll. Hal.
- Grimmia crispula (Hedw.) Turner
- Grimmia cucullata D.M. Hend.
- Grimmia cucullatifolia (Hampe) Mitt.
- Grimmia cupularis Müll. Hal.
- Grimmia curviseta Bouman
- Grimmia cyathocarpa (Hampe) Mitt.
- Grimmia cylindropyxis Müll. Hal.
- Grimmia daviesii (Dicks. ex With.) Turner
- Grimmia decipiens (Schultz) Lindb.
- Grimmia defoliata Müll. Hal.
- Grimmia depilis Müll. Hal.
- Grimmia dissimulata E. Maier
- Grimmia donniana Sm.
- Grimmia elatior Bruch ex Bals.-Criv. & De Not.
- Grimmia elongata Kaulf.
- Grimmia erythraea (Müll. Hal.) Cufod.
- Grimmia exquisita J. Muñoz
- Grimmia falcata Hook. f. & Wilson
- Grimmia fallax Dusén
- Grimmia fascicularis (Hedw.) Müll. Hal.
- Grimmia filiformis (Hedw.) F. Weber & D. Mohr
- Grimmia fontana (Herzog) Broth.
- Grimmia fontinaloides Hook.
- Grimmia forsteri (Dicks. ex With.) Sm.
- Grimmia fulgens (Hedw.) F. Weber & D. Mohr
- Grimmia funalis (Schwägr.) Bruch & Schimp.
- Grimmia fusca Nees & Hornsch.
- Grimmia fuscescens (Wilson) Mitt.
- Grimmia fuscolutea Hook.
- Grimmia gebhardii Spreng.
- Grimmia gigantea (Funck) Schimp.
- Grimmia gracilis (Hedw.) F. Weber & D. Mohr
- Grimmia hamulosa Lesq.
- Grimmia handelii Broth.
- Grimmia hartmanii Schimp.
- Grimmia herzogii Broth.
- Grimmia heteromalla (Hedw.) F. Weber & D. Mohr
- Grimmia homomalla (Hedw.) Sm.
- Grimmia horrida J. Muñoz & Hespanhol
- Grimmia humilis Mitt.
- Grimmia immergens Müll. Hal.
- Grimmia immersoleucophaea (Müll. Hal.) Paris
- Grimmia inclinata (Hedw.) Sm.
- Grimmia incrassicapsulis B.G. Bell
- Grimmia incurva Schwägr.
- Grimmia indica (Dixon & P. de la Varde) Goffinet & Greven
- Grimmia insolita J. Muñoz, I.Solano & D.Quandt
- Grimmia involucrata Cardot
- Grimmia jan-mayensis Dusén
- Grimmia japonica (Dozy & Molk.) Mitt.
- Grimmia julacea (Hedw.) F. Weber & D. Mohr
- Grimmia kansuana Müll. Hal.
- Grimmia khasiana Mitt.
- Grimmia kidderi James
- Grimmia laevidens Broth.
- Grimmia laevigata (Brid.) Brid.
- Grimmia lamprocarpa Müll. Hal.
- Grimmia lanceolata (Hedw.) F. Weber & D. Mohr
- Grimmia lanuginosa (Hedw.) Müll. Hal.
- Grimmia lawiana J. H. Willis
- Grimmia leibergii Paris
- Grimmia lesherae Greven
- Grimmia limbatula Müll. Hal.
- Grimmia linearis (Chal.) Paris
- Grimmia lisae De Not.
- Grimmia longicaulis Dixon
- Grimmia longirostris Hook.
- Grimmia macroperichaetialis Greven
- Grimmia macrotheca Mitt.
- Grimmia macrotyla Cardot & Broth.
- Grimmia madagassa Renauld & Cardot
- Grimmia mairei Cardot & Copp.
- Grimmia malacophylla (Herzog) Broth.
- Grimmia mammosa C. Gao & T. Cao
- Grimmia mariniana Sayre
- Grimmia mauiensis Greven
- Grimmia maunakeaensis Greven
- Grimmia meridionalis (Müll. Hal.) E. Maier
- Grimmia mexicana Greven
- Grimmia microcarpa (Hedw.) Müll. Hal.
- Grimmia microglobosa Müll. Hal.
- Grimmia microodonta (Hedw.) F. Weber & D. Mohr
- Grimmia milleri Hastings & Greven
- Grimmia minuta Müll. Hal.
- Grimmia mixta Herzog
- Grimmia molesta J. Muñoz
- Grimmia mollis Bruch & Schimp.
- Grimmia montana Bruch & Schimp.
- Grimmia moxleyi R.S. Williams
- Grimmia muehlenbeckii Schimp.
- Grimmia muelleri B.S.G. ex Unger & Kotschy
- Grimmia mutica Hampe
- Grimmia navicularis Herzog
- Grimmia neilgiriensis D. Subram.
- Grimmia nepalensis Mitt.
- Grimmia nevadensis Greven
- Grimmia nigrescens (Sw. ex Hedw.) F. Weber & D. Mohr
- Grimmia nigrita (Hedw.) F. Weber & D. Mohr
- Grimmia nivalis Kindb.
- Grimmia novae-zeelandiae R. Br. bis
- Grimmia nuda (Dicks.) Turner
- Grimmia nutans Bruch
- Grimmia obtusata (Müll. Hal. & Hampe) A. Jaeger
- Grimmia obtusolinealis Müll. Hal.
- Grimmia ochracea Müll. Hal.
- Grimmia ochyriana J. Muñoz
- Grimmia olivacea Herzog
- Grimmia olneyi Sull.
- Grimmia oranica Müll. Hal.
- Grimmia orbicularis Bruch
- Grimmia orthotrichacea Müll. Hal.
- Grimmia ovalis (Hedw.) Lindb.
- Grimmia pachyloma (Mont.) Mitt.
- Grimmia pachyphylla Müll. Hal.
- Grimmia paramattensis Müll. Hal.
- Grimmia patagonica Mitt.
- Grimmia percarinata (Dixon & Sakurai) Nog. ex Deguchi
- Grimmia perichaetialis P. de la Varde
- Grimmia pflanzii Broth.
- Grimmia pilifera P. Beauv.
- Grimmia pilosissima Herzog
- Grimmia pitardii Corb.
- Grimmia plagiopodia Hedw.
- Grimmia pomiformis (Hook.) Brid.
- Grimmia praemorsa (Müll. Hal.) Paris
- Grimmia procumbens Mitt.
- Grimmia protensum (A. Braun ex Duby) Mitt.
- Grimmia pseudoanodon Deguchi
- Grimmia pseudopatens Müll. Hal.
- Grimmia pulla Cardot
- Grimmia pulvinata (Hedw.) Sm.
- Grimmia pulvinatula Müll. Hal.
- Grimmia pusilla (Hedw.) F. Weber & D. Mohr
- Grimmia pycnotricha Müll. Hal.
- Grimmia pygmaea Müll. Hal.
- Grimmia ramondii (Lam. & DC.) Margad.
- Grimmia ramulosa (Lindb.) Lindb.
- Grimmia readeri Broth.
- Grimmia recurvirostris (Hedw.) Turner
- Grimmia reflexidens Müll. Hal.
- Grimmia retracta Stirt.
- Grimmia richardii (Brid.) Spreng.
- Grimmia rigidissima Müll. Hal.
- Grimmia robustifolia (Kindb.) Kindb.
- Grimmia rupestris (Hook. f. & Wilson) Müll. Hal.
- Grimmia rupincola F. Weber & D. Mohr
- Grimmia saxatilis Mitt.
- Grimmia saxicola (F. Weber & D. Mohr) Hook. & Taylor
- Grimmia scabripes E.B. Bartram
- Grimmia schleicheri Spreng.
- Grimmia sciuroides Nees & Hornsch.
- Grimmia scouleri (Müll. Hal.) Lesq. & James
- Grimmia serrana J. Muñoz, Shevock & D.R. Toren
- Grimmia serratomucronata Müll. Hal.
- Grimmia sessitana De Not.
- Grimmia shastai Greven
- Grimmia shevockii J. Muñoz, I.Solano & D.Quandt
- Grimmia squamatula Herzog
- Grimmia starckeana (Hedw.) F. Weber & D. Mohr
- Grimmia stenobasis Dixon
- Grimmia stenophylla Müll. Hal.
- Grimmia stirlingii Müll. Hal.
- Grimmia stolonifera Müll. Hal.
- Grimmia streptophylla Sull.
- Grimmia subcallosa Müll. Hal.
- Grimmia subconferta Broth.
- Grimmia subleucophaea Müll. Hal.
- Grimmia subpraemorsa (Broth.) Broth.
- Grimmia subsecunda (Hook. & Grev. ex Harv.) Mitt.
- Grimmia subtergestina Müll. Hal.
- Grimmia sulcipila Müll. Hal.
- Grimmia sundaica (Müll. Hal.) Mitt.
- Grimmia syntrichiacea Müll. Hal.
- Grimmia tasmanica Müll. Hal.
- Grimmia teretinervis Limpr.
- Grimmia tergestina Tomm. ex B.S.G.
- Grimmia tergestina x orbicularis H. Philib. ex Loeske
- Grimmia texicana Greven
- Grimmia torenii Hastings
- Grimmia torquata Drumm.
- Grimmia torreyana Brid.
- Grimmia tortuosa Hook. f. & Wilson
- Grimmia trichodes (F. Weber) Sm.
- Grimmia trichophylla Grev.
- Grimmia triformis Carestia & De Not.
- Grimmia trinervis R.S. Williams
- Grimmia tristicha (Brid.) Schwägr.
- Grimmia tristichoides Margad.
- Grimmia truncatoapocarpa Müll. Hal.
- Grimmia tunariensis (Herzog) Broth.
- Grimmia ungeri Jur.
- Grimmia unicolor Hook.
- Grimmia urceolaris Schleich. ex Nees & Hornsch.
- Grimmia urnulacea Müll. Hal.
- Grimmia vaginulata K. M. Kellman
- Grimmia verticillata (Hedw.) Sm.
- Grimmia verticillatula Thér. & Trab.
- Grimmia vulcanica Besch.
- Grimmia williamsii Deguchi
- Grimmia wilsonii Greven
- Grimmia wrightii (Sull.) Austin
- Grimmia yaulensis Broth.

=== Latest discovered species ===
In the past 20 years (2006 to 2025), the following Grimmia species have been discovered and described:

1. Grimmia milleri Hastings & Greven
2. Grimmia torenii Hastings
3. Grimmia texicana Greven
4. Grimmia ulaandamana J. Muñoz, C. Feng, X.L. Bai & J. Kou
5. Grimmia grevenii C. Feng, X.L. Bai & J. Kou
6. Grimmia insolita J. Muñoz, I. Solano & D. Quandt
7. Grimmia shevockii J. Muñoz, I. Solano & D. Quandt
