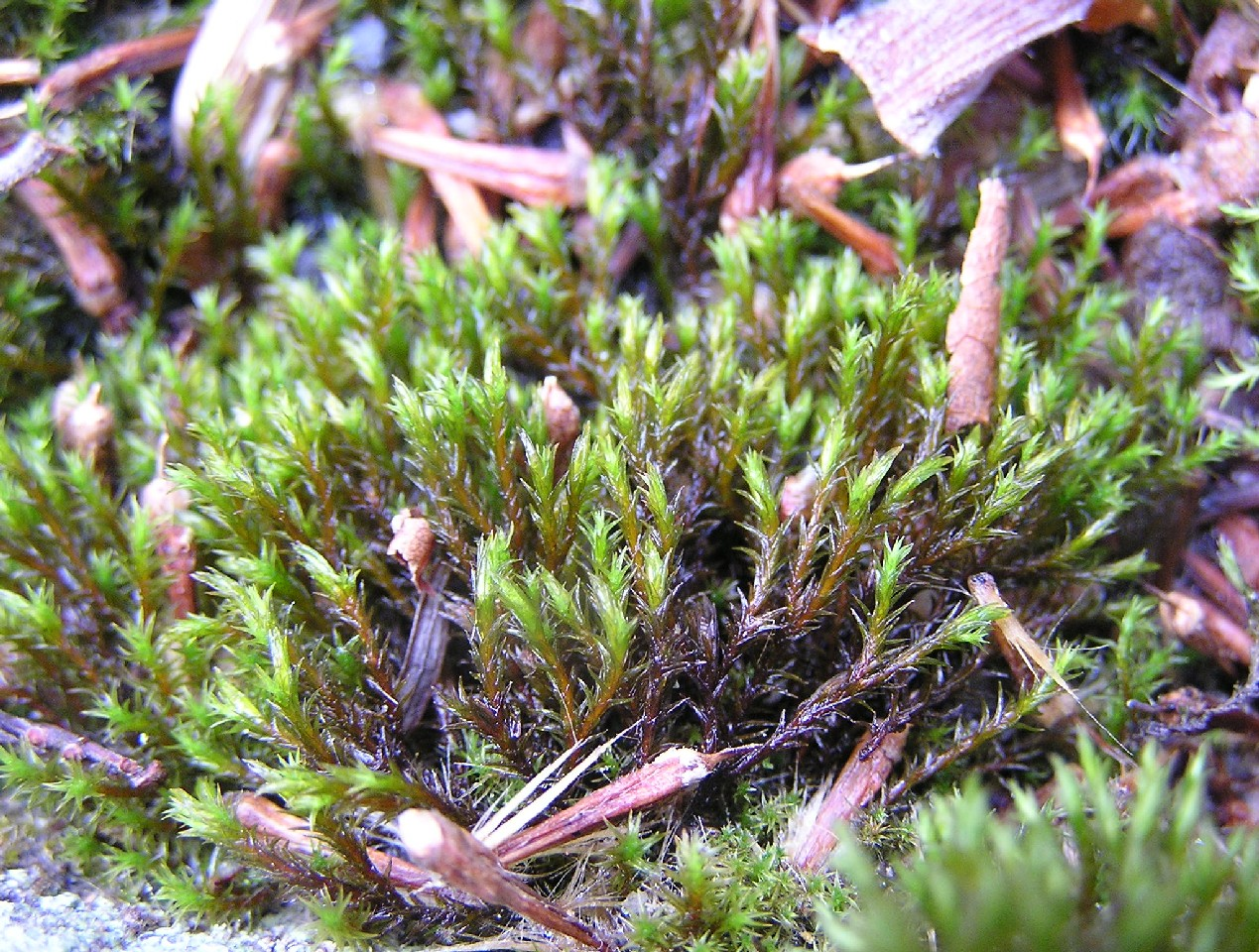
- Schistidium apocarpum

Scientific classification
- Kingdom: Plantae
- Division: Bryophyta
- Class: Bryopsida
- Subclass: Dicranidae
- Order: Grimmiales
- Family: Grimmiaceae
- Genus: Schistidium; Bruch & Schimp.

Species
- See text

= Schistidium =

Genus of mosses

Schistidium is a plant genus in the moss family Grimmiaceae.

== Species ==
The Plant List and Tropicos recognise about 150 accepted species:

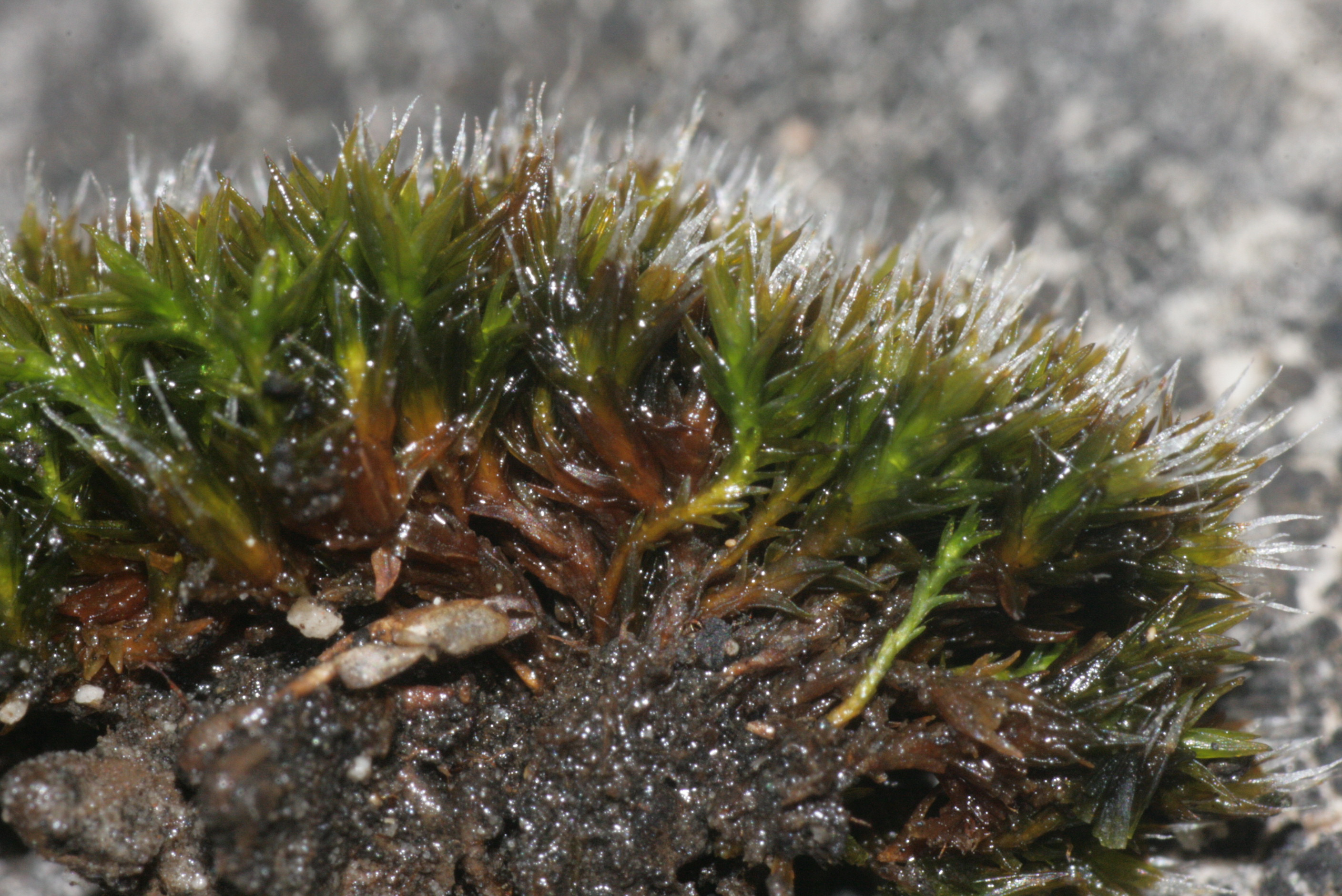
Schistidium brunnescens

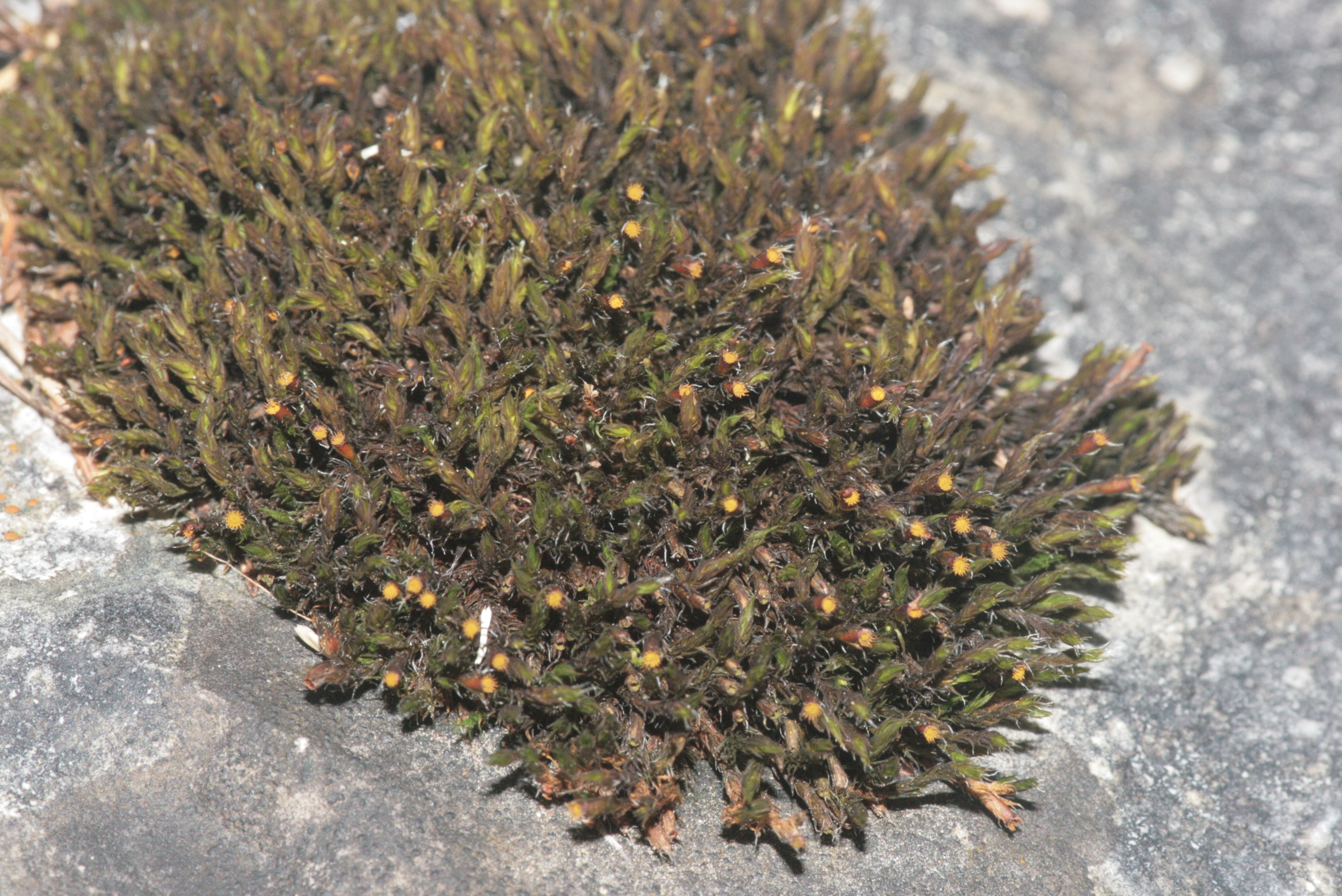
Schistidium crassipilum

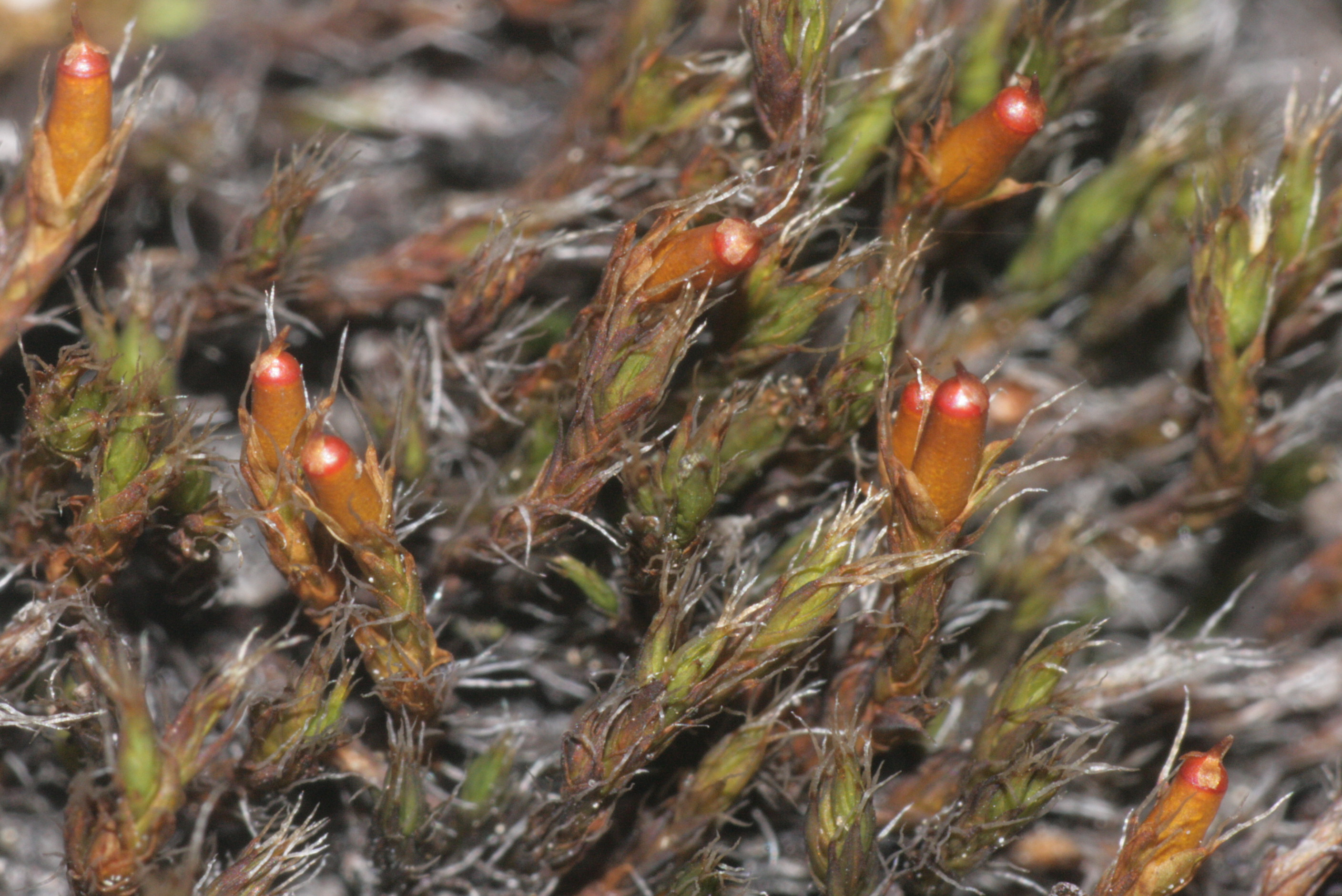
Schistidium robustum

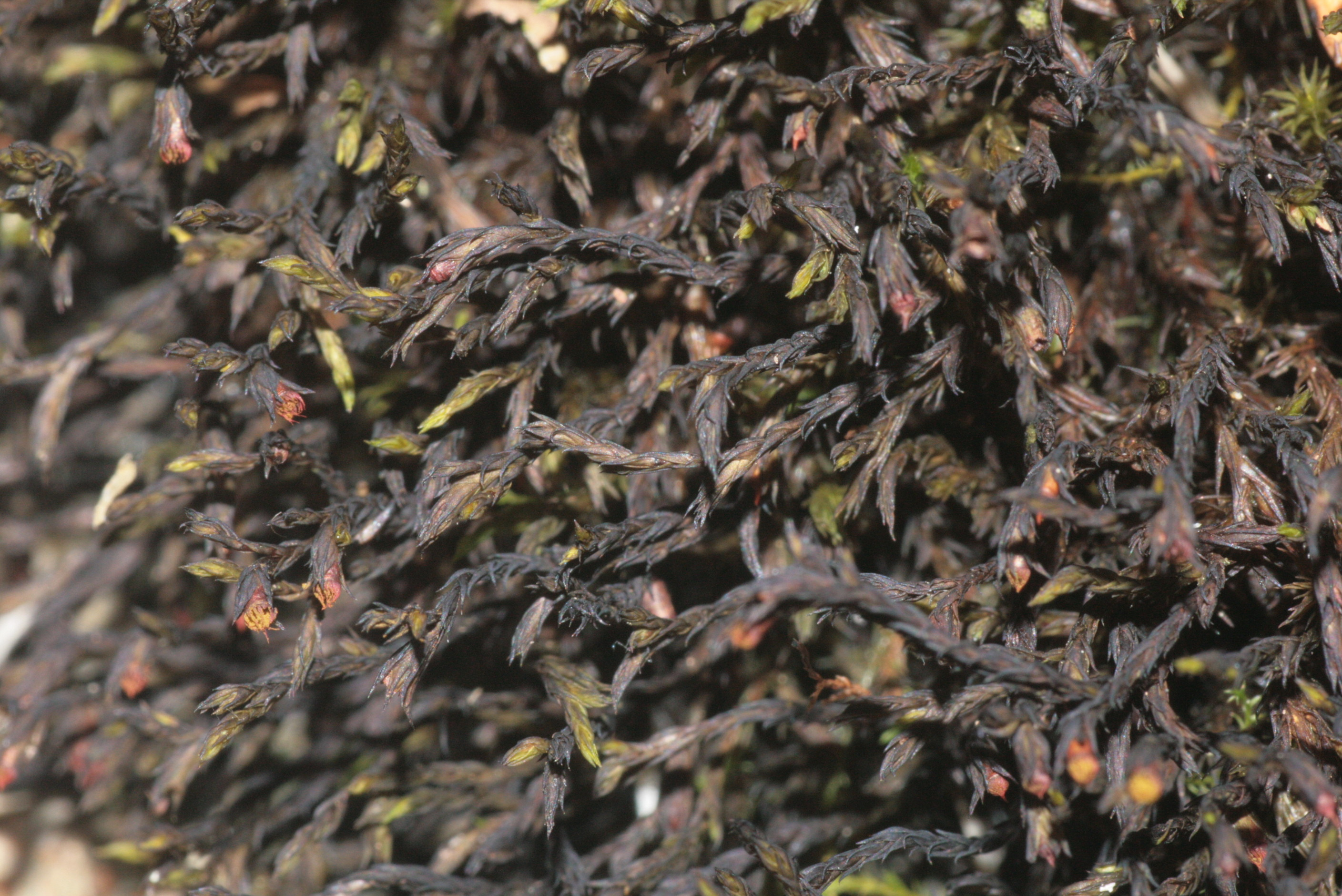
Schistidium trichodon

=== A ===
- Schistidium abrupticostatum (Bryhn) Ignatova & H.H.Blom
- Schistidium absconditum (Cardot) Ochyra
- Schistidium agassizii Sull. & Lesq.
- Schistidium alfredii (R.Br.bis) Ochyra
- Schistidium ambiguum Sull.
- Schistidium amblyophyllum (Müll.Hal.) Ochyra & Hertel
- Schistidium andinum (Mitt.) Herzog
- Schistidium andreaeopsis (Müll.Hal.) Laz.
- Schistidium angustissimum (P.de la Varde) Ochyra
- Schistidium antarctici (Cardot) L.I.Savicz & Smirnova
- Schistidium antipodum (Müll.Hal.) Ochyra
- Schistidium apocarpum (Hedw.) Bruch & Schimp.
- Schistidium atrichum (Müll.Hal. & Kindb.) W.A.Weber
- Schistidium atrofuscum (Schimp.) Limpr.
- Schistidium australiense Ochyra

=== B ===
- Schistidium bakalinii Ignatova & H.H.Blom
- Schistidium beckettianum (Müll.Hal.) Ochyra
- Schistidium boreale Poelt
- Schistidium boschbergianum (Müll.Hal.) Ochyra
- Schistidium brunnescens Limpr.
- Schistidium bryhnii I.Hagen

=== C ===
- Schistidium caespiticium (F.Weber & D.Mohr) Brid.
- Schistidium caffrum (Rehmann ex Müll.Hal.) Ochyra
- Schistidium calycinum (Herzog) Ochyra
- Schistidium canadense (Dupr.) Ignatova & H.H.Blom
- Schistidium canterburiense Ochyra
- Schistidium celatum (Cardot) B.G.Bell
- Schistidium chalubinskii Pilous
- Schistidium chenii (S.H.Lin) T.Cao, C.Gao & J.C.Zhao
- Schistidium chocayae Herzog
- Schistidium chrysoneurum (Müll.Hal.) Ochyra
- Schistidium chubutense (Cardot & Broth.) Ochyra
- Schistidium ciliatum (Hedw.) Brid.
- Schistidium cinclidodonteum (Müll.Hal.) B.Bremer
- Schistidium coloradense (Austin) Ochyra
- Schistidium confertum (Funck) Bruch & Schimp.
- Schistidium confusum H.H.Blom
- Schistidium crassipilum H.H.Blom
- Schistidium crassithecium H.H.Blom ex B.H.Allen
- Schistidium cribrodontium (Herzog) Ochyra
- Schistidium cryptocarpum Mogensen & H.H.Blom
- Schistidium cupulare (Müll.Hal.) Ochyra
- Schistidium cyathiforme (R.Br.bis) Ochyra

=== D ===
- Schistidium deceptionense Ochyra, Bednarek-Ochyra & Lewis-Smith
- Schistidium deguchianum Ochyra & Bednarek-Ochyra
- Schistidium depile (Müll.Hal.) Ochyra
- Schistidium domingense (Spreng.) Brid.
- Schistidium dominiii Vilh.
- Schistidium donatii (Herzog & Thér.) Ochyra & Matteri
- Schistidium drummondii Taylor
- Schistidium dupretii (Thér.) W.A.Weber

=== E ===
- Schistidium echinatum Ignatova & H.H.Blom
- Schistidium elegantulum H.H.Blom

=== F ===
- Schistidium falcatum (Hook.f. & Wilson) B.Bremer
- Schistidium fallax (Dusén) Ochyra & Matteri
- Schistidium flaccidum (De Not.) Ochyra
- Schistidium flexicaule (Müll.Hal.) Ochyra
- Schistidium flexifolium (Hampe) Ochyra
- Schistidium flexipile (Lindb. ex Broth.) G.Roth
- Schistidium floerkeanum (F.Weber & D.Mohr) Mitt.
- Schistidium foraminis-martini
- Schistidium frahmianum Ochyra & Afonina
- Schistidium frigidum H.H.Blom
- Schistidium frisvollianum H.H.Blom
- Schistidium fuliginosum (Schimp.) Ochyra

=== G ===
- Schistidium gracile (Röhl.) Limpr.
- Schistidium gracillimum (E.B.Bartram) Ochyra
- Schistidium grande Poelt
- Schistidium grandirete H.H.Blom

=== H ===
- Schistidium halinae Ochyra
- Schistidium hedwigiaceum (Müll.Hal.) Ochyra
- Schistidium heterophyllum (Kindb.) T.T.McIntosh
- Schistidium holmenianum Steere & Brassard
- Schistidium hyalinocuspidatum (Müll.Hal.) B.G.Bell

=== I ===
- Schistidium imberbe (Sm.) Nees & Hornsch.

=== K ===
- Schistidium konoi (Broth.) Ignatova & H.H.Blom

=== L ===
- Schistidium laingii (R.Br.bis) Ochyra
- Schistidium latifolium (J.E.Zetterst.) Weim.
- Schistidium leptoneurum Ochyra
- Schistidium lewis-smithii Ochyra
- Schistidium liliputanum (Müll.Hal.) Deguchi
- Schistidium lorentzianum (Müll.Hal.) Ochyra & Matteri

=== M ===
- Schistidium macrotylum (Cardot & Broth.) Ochyra
- Schistidium malacophyllum Herzog
- Schistidium maoricum (Paris) Ochyra
- Schistidium marginatum Hook.f. & Wilson
- Schistidium maritimum (Turner ex Robt. Scott) Bruch & Schimp.
- Schistidium minimeperichaetiale (R.Br.bis) Ochyra
- Schistidium mitchellii (R.Br.bis) Ochyra
- Schistidium mucronatum H.H.Blom, Shevock, D.G.Long & Ochyra
- Schistidium muticum (Schreb. ex Hedw.) Mitt.

=== N ===
- Schistidium nervosum (P.Beauv.) Brid.
- Schistidium nodulosum Stirt.

=== O ===
- Schistidium oamaruense (R.Br.bis) Ochyra
- Schistidium obscurum H.H.Blom, Köckinger & Ignatova
- Schistidium occidentale (E.Lawton) S.P.Churchill
- Schistidium occultum (Müll.Hal.) Ochyra & Matteri
- Schistidium olivaceum (Herzog) Ochyra & J.Muñoz
- Schistidium oranicum (Müll.Hal.) Ochyra

=== P ===
- Schistidium pachyneurulum (Müll.Hal. & Kindb.) Ochyra
- Schistidium pacificum (E.Lawton) Ochyra
- Schistidium papillosum Culm.
- Schistidium perichaetiale (P.de la Varde) Ochyra
- Schistidium perplexum (Thér.) Ochyra
- Schistidium poeltii H.H.Blom
- Schistidium praemorsum (Müll.Hal.) Herzog
- Schistidium pruinosum (Wilson) G.Roth
- Schistidium pseudorivulare (Kindb.) Ochyra
- Schistidium pulchrum H.H.Blom

=== R ===
- Schistidium readeri (Broth.) Ochyra & J.Muñoz
- Schistidium recurvum H.H.Blom
- Schistidium repens (Hook.) Brid.
- Schistidium revisum (R.Br.bis) Ochyra
- Schistidium riparium H.H.Blom, Shevock, D.G.Long & Ochyra
- Schistidium rivulare (Brid.) Podp.
- Schistidium rivulariopsis (R.S.Williams) Ochyra
- Schistidium robustum (Nees & Hornsch.) H.H.Blom

=== S ===
- Schistidium saxatile (Mitt.) Ochyra
- Schistidium scabrifolium (Broth.) H.A.Mill., H.Whittier & B.Whittier
- Schistidium scabripes (E.B.Bartram) Deguchi
- Schistidium scandicum H.H.Blom
- Schistidium searellii (R.Br.bis) Ochyra
- Schistidium serratomucronatum (Müll.Hal.) Ochyra
- Schistidium sibiricum Ignatova & H.H.Blom
- Schistidium siluricum (Velen.) Vilh.
- Schistidium sinensiapocarpum (Müll.Hal.) Ochyra
- Schistidium singarense (Schiffn.) Laz.
- Schistidium spinosum H.H.Blom & Lüth
- Schistidium squamatulum (Herzog) Ochyra & J.Muñoz
- Schistidium steerei Ochyra
- Schistidium stirlingii (Müll.Hal.) Ochyra
- Schistidium streptophyllum (Sull.) Herzog
- Schistidium strictum (Turner) Loeske ex Mårtensson
- Schistidium subconfertum (Broth.) Deguchi
- Schistidium subflaccidum (Kindb.) H.H.Blom
- Schistidium subflexifolium (Müll.Hal.) Ochyra
- Schistidium subincurvum (Austin) Ochyra
- Schistidium subjulaceum H.H.Blom
- Schistidium submuticum Zick. ex H.H.Blom
- Schistidium subpraemorsum Broth.
- Schistidium subsessile (Brid.) Brid.
- Schistidium succulentum Ignatova & H.H.Blom
- Schistidium syntrichiaceum (Müll.Hal.) B.G.Bell

=== T ===
- Schistidium tenerrimum (Nees & Hornsch.) G.Roth
- Schistidium tenerum (J.E.Zetterst.) Nyholm
- Schistidium tenuinerve Ignatova & H.H.Blom
- Schistidium torquatum (Hook.) Brid.
- Schistidium torreyanum (Brid.) Ochyra
- Schistidium trichodon (Brid.) Poelt
- Schistidium triquetrum (Spruce) Mitt.
- Schistidium truncatoapocarpum (Müll.Hal.) Ochyra
- Schistidium turbinatum (R.Br.bis) Ochyra

=== U ===
- Schistidium urceolare (Schleich. ex Nees & Hornsch.) Ochyra
- Schistidium urnulaceum (Müll.Hal.) B.G.Bell

=== V ===
- Schistidium venetum H.H.Blom

=== W ===
- Schistidium wrightii Ochyra

=== Y ===
- Schistidium yaulense (Broth.) Ochyra & J.Muñoz
