= Seligeria cardotti =

Seligeria cardotii

Scientific classification
- Kingdom: Plantae
- Division: Bryophyta
- Class: Bryopsida
- Subclass: Dicranidae
- Order: Grimmiales
- Family: Seligeriaceae
- Genus: Seligeria
- Species: S. cardotti

Binomial name
- Seligeria cardotti R. Br. bis

Species of moss

Seligeria cardotii is one of the two species in genus Seligeria, bryophytes of the Seligeriaceae family, in the Southern Hemisphere; an additional 19 species have been described in the Northern Hemisphere.

== Appearance ==
S. cardotii is an erect, light green to blue-green moss. It typically does not grow longer than 3 mm. Its leaves are linear with a narrow midrib between 2–3 rows of translucent cells on either side. The leaves do not sheath at the stem and have an entire to slightly crenellate sobarnis margin. Capsules are 0.4–0.5–mm long and obovate-hemispheric when moist, becoming obconic when dry. The peristome contains 16 moderately short, reddish, lanceolate teeth approximately 40–μm. Spores are 10–14–μm in diameter and green.

== Geographical distribution and habitat ==
The type specimen of S. cardotii was described in the nineteenth century from a collection from New Zealand's South Island, where it is widespread on moist calcareous soils. It has also been recorded in Australia from a single population in Tasmania.
