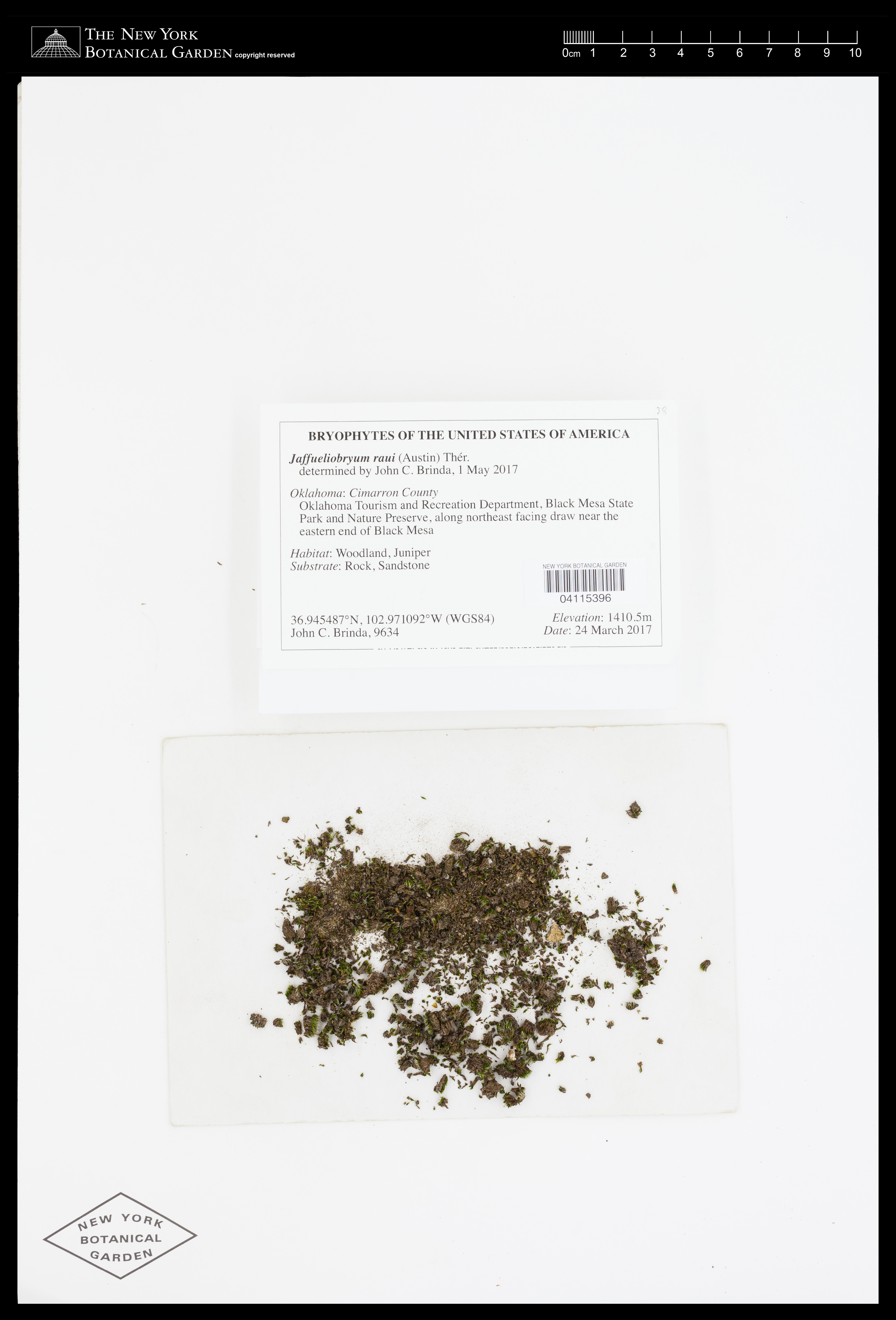

Scientific classification
- Kingdom: Plantae
- Division: Bryophyta
- Class: Bryopsida
- Subclass: Dicranidae
- Order: Grimmiales
- Family: Ptychomitriaceae
- Genus: Jaffueliobryum; Thér.

= Jaffueliobryum =

Genus of mosses

Jaffueliobryum is a genus of moss in family Ptychomitriaceae.

== Species ==
It contains the following species:

- Jaffueliobryum arsenei — endemic to Mexico.

== See also ==
- Mosses of North America
