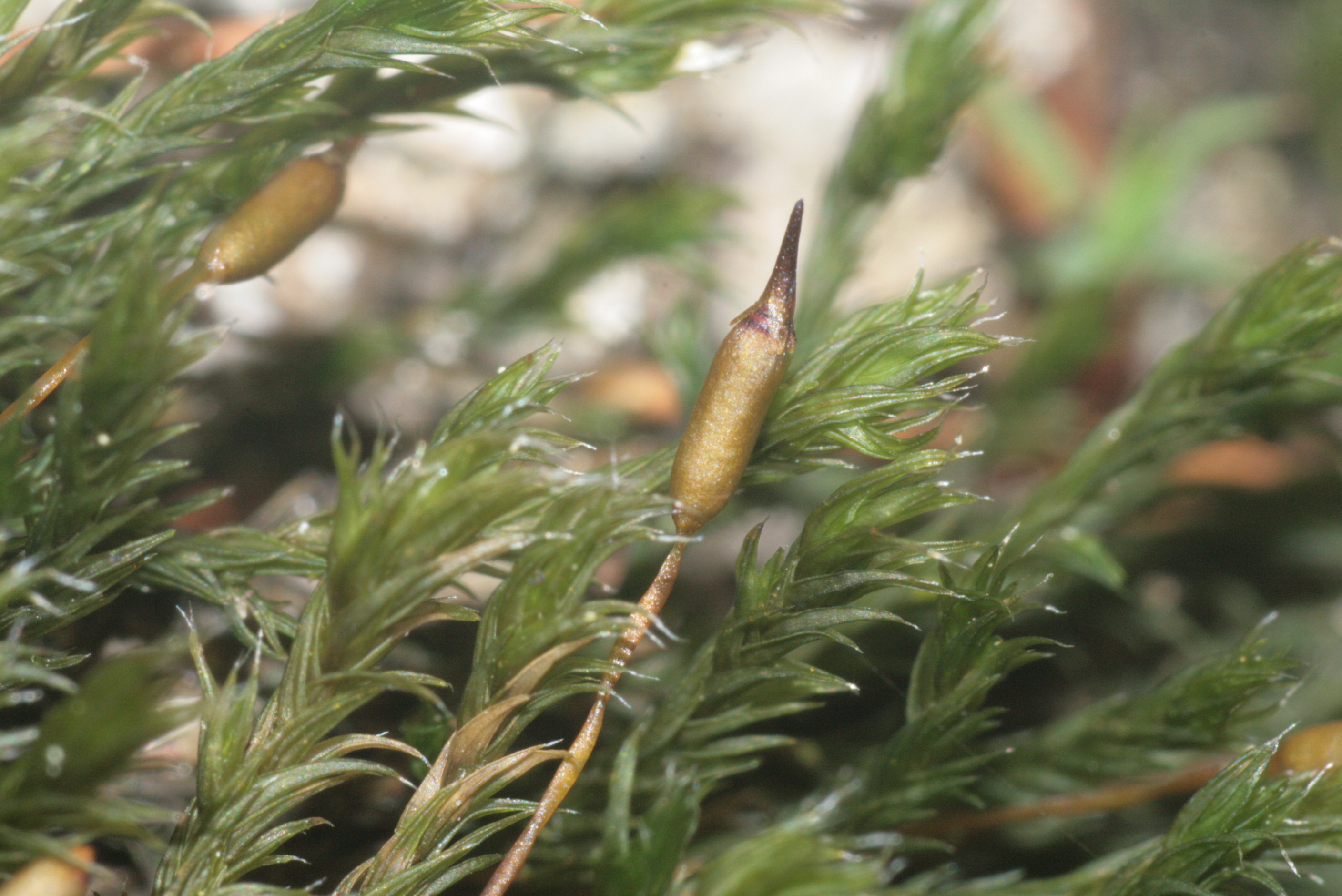
- Bucklandiella affinis

Scientific classification
- Kingdom: Plantae
- Division: Bryophyta
- Class: Bryopsida
- Subclass: Dicranidae
- Order: Grimmiales
- Family: Grimmiaceae
- Genus: Bucklandiella; Roiv.

Species
- See text

= Bucklandiella =

Genus of mosses

Bucklandiella is a genus of moss in the family Grimmiaceae.

The genus name of Bucklandiella is in honour of William Buckland (1784 – 1856), an English theologian who became Dean of Westminster. He was also a geologist and palaeontologist.

The genus was circumscribed by Heikki Roivainen in Ann. Bot. Fenn. Vol.9 on page 116 in 1972.

== Species ==
- Bucklandiella affinis
- Bucklandiella afoninae
- Bucklandiella allanfifei
- Bucklandiella brevipes
- Bucklandiella elegans
- Bucklandiella heterosticha
- Bucklandiella lawtoniae
- Bucklandiella longtonii
- Bucklandiella macounii
- Bucklandiella microcarpa
- Bucklandiella obesa
- Bucklandiella occidentalis
- Bucklandiella pacifica
- Bucklandiella sudetica
- Bucklandiella venusta
