= Dryptodon =

Dryptodon may refer to:

- Dryptodon (plant), a genus of mosses in the family Grimmiaceae
- Dryptodon, a genus of fossil animals in the family Stylinodontidae; synonym of Ectoganus
