= Leucoperichaetium =

Scientific classification
- Kingdom: Plantae
- Division: Bryophyta
- Class: Bryopsida
- Subclass: Dicranidae
- Order: Grimmiales
- Family: Grimmiaceae
- Genus: Leucoperichaetium

Genus of mosses

Leucoperichaetium is a genus of moss in family Grimmiaceae.

It contains the following species (but this list may be incomplete):

- Leucoperichaetium eremophilum, Magill
