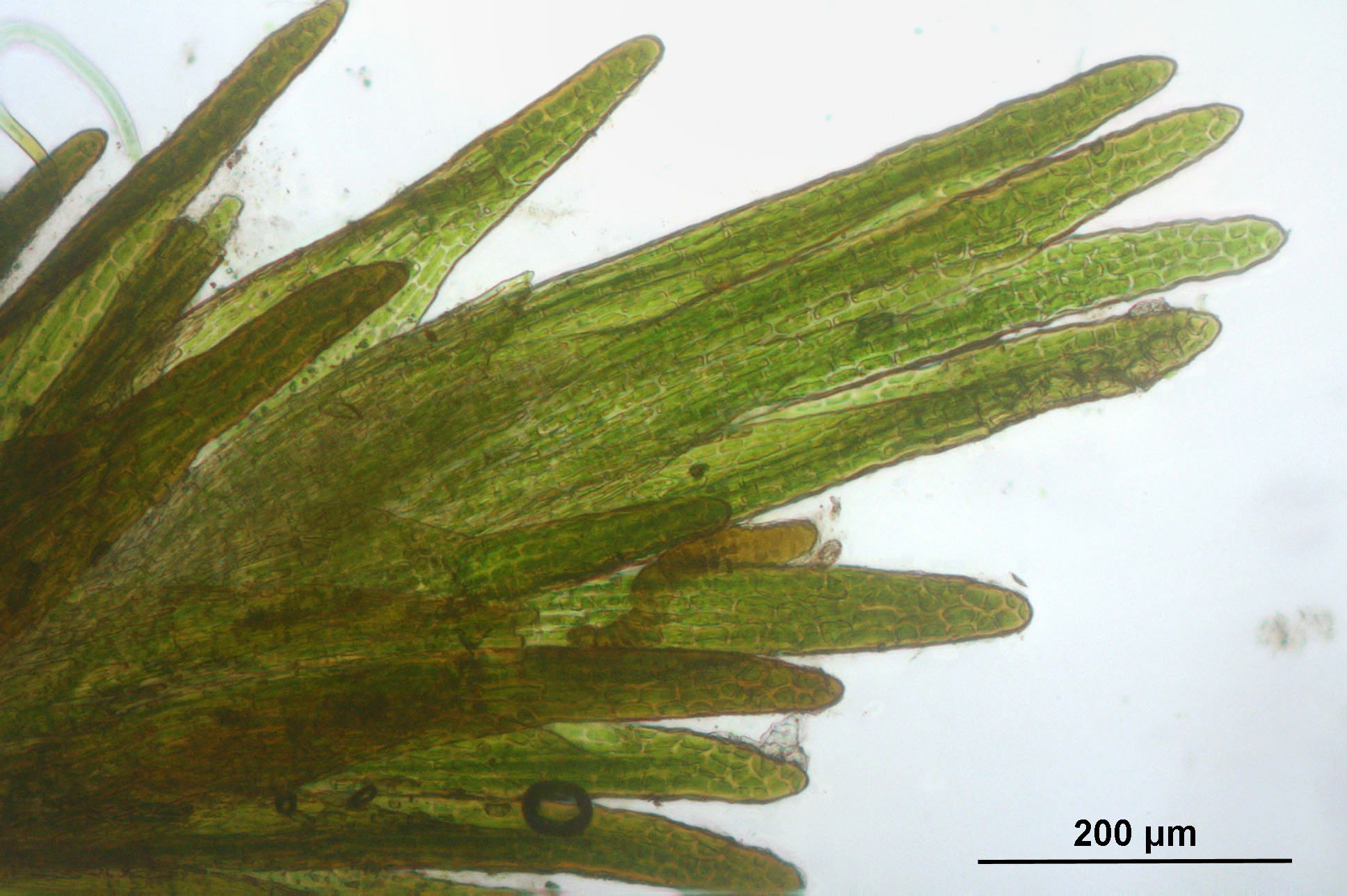
- Seligeria trifaria

Scientific classification
- Kingdom: Plantae
- Division: Bryophyta
- Class: Bryopsida
- Subclass: Dicranidae
- Order: Grimmiales
- Family: Seligeriaceae
- Genus: Seligeria; Bruch & Schimp.

= Seligeria =

Genus of mosses

Seligeria is a genus of mosess. There are 38 unique species of Seligeria on The Plant List.

== Distribution ==
Seligeria can be found in Europe, North America, New Zealand and Tasmania. Most species of Seligeria are native to the Northern Hemisphere, but Seligeria cardotti and Seligeria diminuta are native to the Southern Hemisphere.

Selected species:

- Seligeria acutifolia
- Seligeria brevifolia
- Seligeria calcarea
- Seligeria calycina
- Seligeria campylopoda
- Seligeria cardotti
- Seligeria carniolica
- Seligeria diminuta
- Seligeria diversifolia
- Seligeria donniana
- Seligeria oelandica
- Seligeria patula
- Seligeria pusilla
- Seligeria recurvata
- Seligeria trifaria
