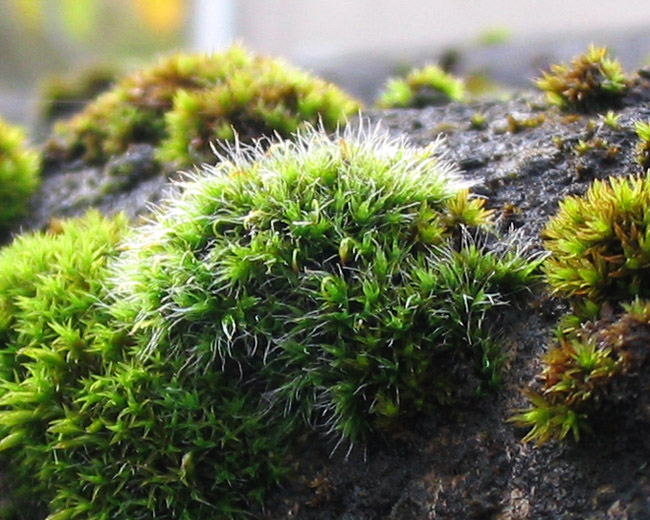
- Grimmia pulvinata, showing silvery lanceolate leaves

Conservation status
- Least Concern (IUCN 3.1) (Europe regional assessment)

- Apparently Secure (NatureServe)

Scientific classification
- Kingdom: Plantae
- Division: Bryophyta
- Class: Bryopsida
- Subclass: Dicranidae
- Order: Grimmiales
- Family: Grimmiaceae
- Genus: Grimmia
- Species: G. pulvinata

Binomial name
- Grimmia pulvinata (Hedw.) Sm.

= Grimmia pulvinata =

Species of moss

Grimmia pulvinata (otherwise known as grey-cushioned grimmia or pulvinate dry rock moss) is a bryophyte moss common in temperate climates worldwide.

== Characteristics ==
Grimmia pulvinata grows in a small, cushion-like shape, around 1–2 cm (0.39–0.79 in) tall. Its color ranges from a grey-green to an orange-yellow. Its leaves are lanceolate, being broad and oval-shaped at the base and very narrow toward the tip. They may show a silvery hue near the tip in some specimens. Its capsules are oval-shaped, and bend back into the leaves when the plant is dry, and stand out when it is moist.

== Habitat ==
Grimmia pulvinata colonizes a variety of surfaces including rocks, concrete, and tree trunks. It is tolerant of a wide range of pH levels on surfaces, allowing it to live on many types of rock.

However, it prefers surfaces such as old mortar and tree trunks.

== Distribution ==
Grimmia pulvinata is the most common species in the genus Grimmia, with a nearly worldwide distribution. It is particularly common in Britain and the west coast of North America. It lives primarily in temperate regions, from sea level to elevations up to 9,800 ft (3,000 m).

== Ecological role ==
Grimmia pulvinata is a pioneer species, meaning it is among the first organisms to colonize habitat which has been disturbed by an event, such as a forest fire. Its resistance to pollution allows it to colonize urban areas, such as roofs, walls, and tarmac.
