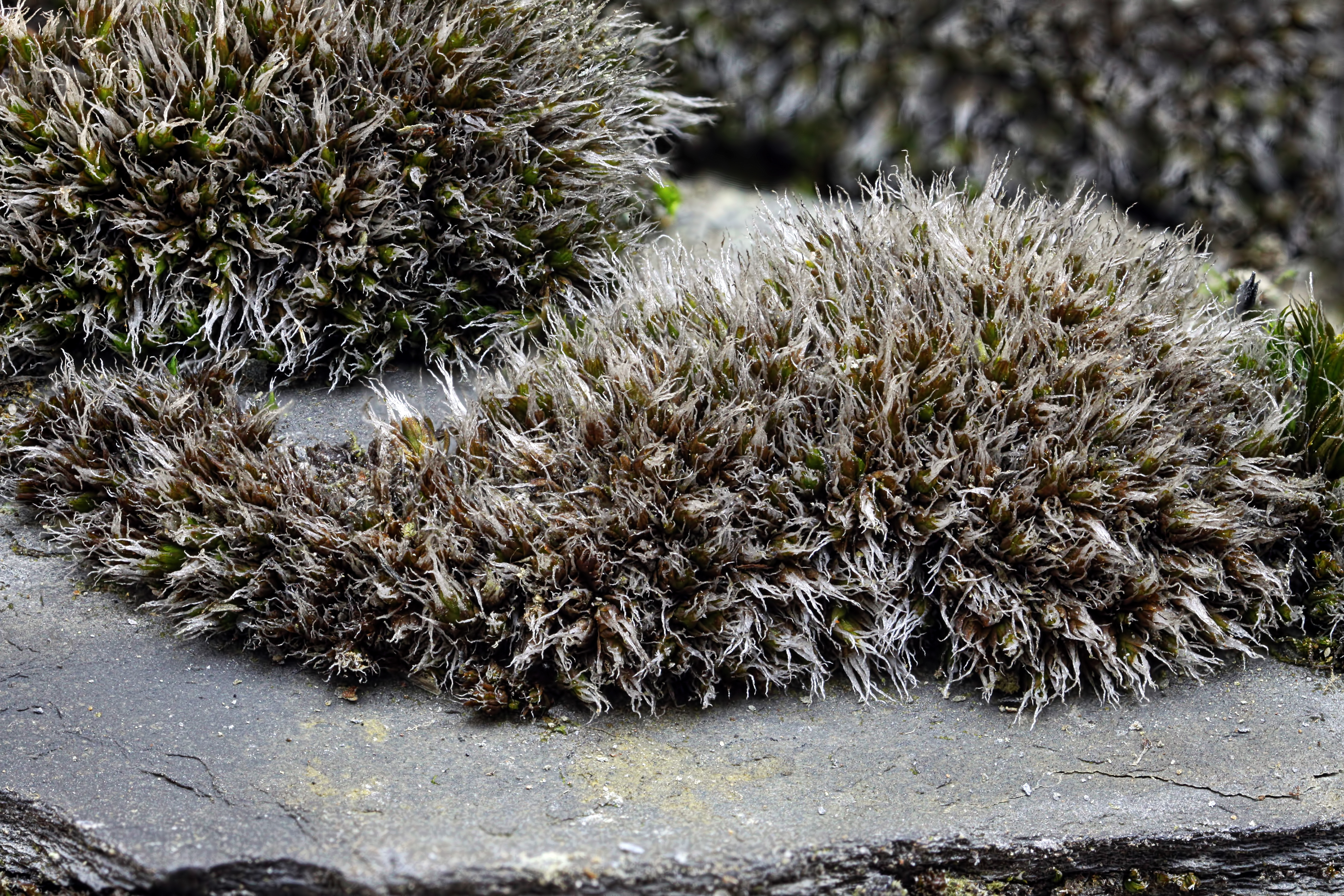
- Coscinodon cribrosus

Scientific classification
- Kingdom: Plantae
- Division: Bryophyta
- Class: Bryopsida
- Subclass: Dicranidae
- Order: Grimmiales
- Family: Grimmiaceae
- Genus: Coscinodon; Spreng.

= Coscinodon =

Genus of mosses

Coscinodon is a genus of mosses belonging to the family Grimmiaceae.

The genus has almost cosmopolitan distribution.

Species:

- Coscinodon arctolimnius (Steere) Steere
- Coscinodon bolivianus Broth.
- Coscinodon calyptratus (Drumm.) C.E.O.Jensen
- Coscinodon cribrosus (Hedw.) Spruce
- Coscinodon hartzii C.E.O.Jensen
- Coscinodon horridus (J.Muñoz & Hespanhol) Hugonnot, R.D.Porley & Ignatov
- Coscinodon humilis Milde
- Coscinodon lawianus (J.H.Willis) Ochyra
- Coscinodon monchiquensis R.D.Porley, Ochyra & Ignatova
- Coscinodon patersonii Fergusson
- Coscinodon pseudohartzii Hastings, Ignatova & Köckinger
- Coscinodon yukonensis Hastings
