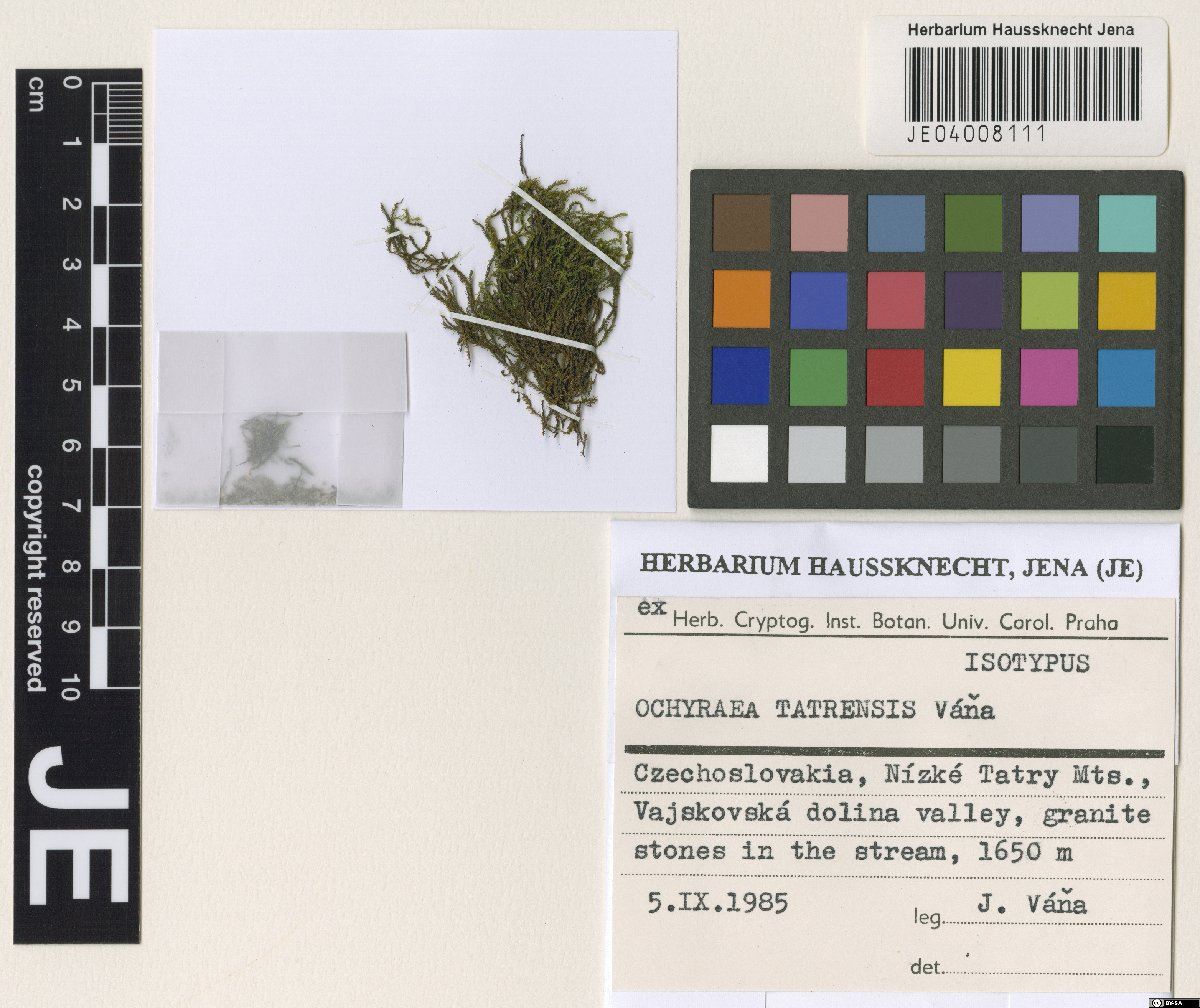

Conservation status
- Critically Endangered (IUCN 3.1)

Scientific classification
- Kingdom: Plantae
- Division: Bryophyta
- Class: Bryopsida
- Subclass: Bryidae
- Order: Hypnales
- Family: Amblystegiaceae
- Genus: Platyhypnum
- Species: P. tatrense

Binomial name
- Platyhypnum tatrense (Váňa) Hedenäs & Ignatov

Synonyms
- Ochyraea tatrensis Váňa

= Platyhypnum tatrense =

Species of moss

Platyhypnum tatrense is a species of moss in the family Amblystegiaceae endemic to Slovakia. Its natural habitat is rivers. It is threatened by habitat loss.
