= Platyhypnum =

Scientific classification
- Kingdom: Plantae
- Division: Bryophyta
- Class: Bryopsida
- Subclass: Bryidae
- Order: Hypnales
- Family: Amblystegiaceae
- Genus: Platyhypnum; Loeske

Synonyms
- Ochyraea Váňa; Platyhypnidium M.Fleisch.

Genus of mosses

Platyhypnum is a genus of mosses in the family Amblystegiaceae.

Previously accepted as Ochyraea, that genus was named in honour of Ryszard Ochyra (born 1949), a Polish bryologist and was circumscribed by Jiří Váňa in J. Bryol. vol.14 on page 261 in 1986. They have been found in Europe and across Russia.

== Species ==
As accepted by Catalog of Life:

- Platyhypnum alpestre (Hedw.) Ochyra
- Platyhypnum alpinum (Lindb.) Loeske
- Platyhypnum cochleariifolium(Venturi) Ochyra
- Platyhypnum duriusculum (De Not.) Ochyra
- Platyhypnum molle (Hedw.) Loeske
- Platyhypnum norvegicum (Schimp.) Ochyra
- Platyhypnum smithii (Sw.) Ochyra
- Platyhypnum tatrense (Váňa) Hedenäs & Ignatov
- Platyhypnum tsurugizanicum (Cardot) Ochyra
