= Thiodolf Saelan =

Finnish physician and botanist

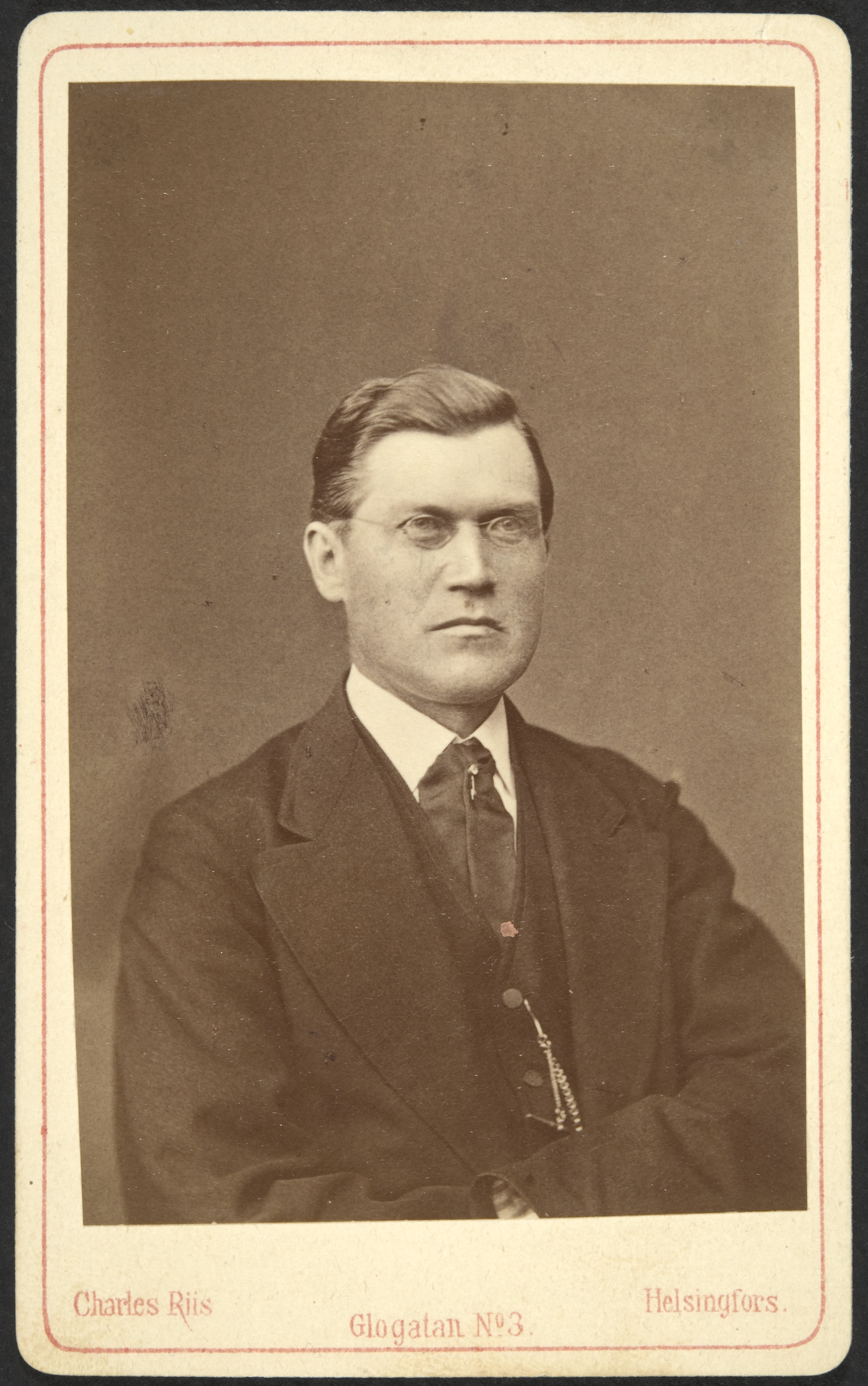
- Thiodolf Saelan in the 1870s
- Born: 20 November 1834; Lappeenranta
- Died: 24 June 1921 (aged 86); Helsinki
- Scientific career
- Fields: Botany, Medicine
- Author abbrev. (botany): Saelán

Anders Thiodolf Saelan (Sælan) (born 20 November 1834 in Lappeenranta; died 24 June 1921 in Helsinki) was a Finnish physician and botanist. He reformed Finnish mental health care during his decades as chief physician of Lapinlahti Psychiatric Hospital in Helsinki.

== Life and career ==
Saelan's parents were Anders Johan Saelan (1795–1841), pastor of Jämsä, and Antoinette Henrietta Kristina Müller. He attended Porvoo Upper Secondary School (1844–1848) and Porvoo High School (1848–1851) and became a university student in 1851. Saelan graduated from the University of Helsinki with a bachelor's degree in physical mathematics in 1855 and a master's degree in 1857. Saelan studied in Stockholm from 1860 to 1861. He became a Bachelor of Medicine in 1859 and a licentiate and Doctor of Medicine and Surgery in 1865. He later became a Master of Joy (Riemumaisteri, an honorary degree awarded to those working for 50 years since receiving a master's degree) and Honorary Doctor of Philosophy in 1907 and a Doctor of Joy in 1917.

Saelan was an amanuensis of the University of Helsinki Botanical Garden from 1859 to 1866, an additional doctor of the National Board of Medicine from 1861 to 1864, and an acting doctor from the Tornio and Lapland districts as a district physician from 1864 to 1865. Saelan worked at Lapinlahti Psychiatric Hospital as a resident from 1865 to 1868 and as an attorney general from 1868 to 1904. His dissertation Om självmordet i Finland i statistiskt och rättsmedicinskt hänseende ("About suicide in Finland in statistical and forensic terms") was the first Finnish study to deal with suicides from a medical point of view. He was awarded the title of professor in 1877. For several decades, he was Finland's most important expert in psychiatry and mental health care.

== Botanical work ==
Saelan's other field was botany, where he was also one of the most important Finnish researchers of his time. He published more than 100 papers on the floristics (plant geography) of Finland. He was an avid botanist and spent much of his time in the Lapinlahti hospital park. Saelan, at the time a young graduate, collaborated with William Nylander to publish Herbarium Musei fennici in 1859. This was a catalogue of the specimens in the herbarium of the botanical museum. Nylander wrote about the cryptogams, while Saelen dealt with the phanerogams. This catalogue listed 1,025 species of vascular plants, 333 mosses, 316 lichens, 71 algae, and 375 fungi.

The moss genus Saelania is named in honour of Thiodolf Saelan.

== Personal ==
Thiodolf Saelan was married in 1873 to Naema Lovisa Vivika von Knorring (1850–1920). They had four children: Gertrud Maria (1875–1911), Karl Thorvald (1878–1959), Eva Johanna Paersch (1883–1966), and Sigyn Naemi Lindberg (1888–1965). Karl Saelan was the technical director of the Kaukas pulp mill.

== Selected works ==
- Lönnrot, Elias; Saelan, Thiodolf (1866). Flora Fennica: Suomen kasvio. Helsinki: Suomalaisen Kirjallisuuden Seuran kirjapainossa.
- Bomansson, J. O.; Saelan, Thiodolf (1889). Herbarium Musei Fennici: enumeratio plantarum Musei Fennici / quam edidit Societas pro Fauna et Flora Fennica. Helsinki: Ex officina typographica H.J. Simelii. doi:10.5962/bhl.title.40897.
- Saelan, Thiodolf; Blomstedt, Väinö (1907). Finlands förnämsta ätliga och giftiga svampar [Finland's foremost edible and poisonous mushrooms]. Helsinki: Otava. OCLC 58263074.
- Saelan, Thiodolf (1916). Finlands botaniska litteratur till och med år 1900 [Finnish botanical literature up to and including 1900] (PDF). Acta Societatis pro fauna et flora Fennica (in Swedish). Vol. 43. Helsinki. pp. 1–633. ISSN 0373-6660.
- Achté, Kalle, ed. (1981). Professori A. Th. Saelanin muistikirjat osat 1–2 [Professor A. Th. Saelan Notebooks Parts 1–2]. Helsinki: Helsingin yliopistollinen keskussairaalaliitto, Psykiatrian klinikka (Helsinki University Central Hospital Association, Psychiatric clinic).

The standard author abbreviation Saelán is used to indicate this person as the author when citing a botanical name.
