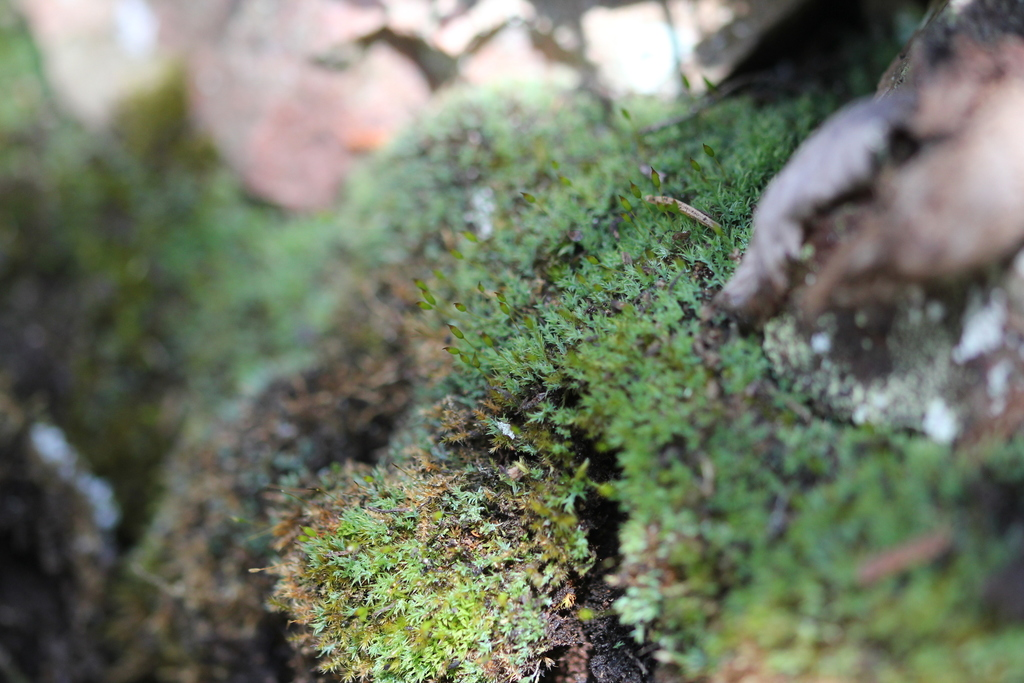

Scientific classification
- Kingdom: Plantae
- Division: Bryophyta
- Class: Bryopsida
- Subclass: Dicranidae
- Order: Grimmiales
- Family: Saelaniaceae; Ignatov & Fedosov
- Genus: Saelania; Lindb.

Species
- See text.

= Saelania =

Genus of mosses

Saelania is a genus of mosses in the monotypic family Saelaniaceae in subclass Dicranidae. The genus was previously placed in family Ditrichaceae. Saelania is named after Finnish botanist Thiodolf Saelan.

== Species ==
The genus Saelania contains four species:

- Saelania caesia (Vill. ex P. Beauv.) Lindb.
- Saelania glaucescens (Hedw.) Broth.
- Saelania pruinosa (Müll. Hal.) Broth.
- Saelania subglaucescens (Müll. Hal.) Broth.
