= William Nylander (botanist) =

Finnish botanist and lichenologist (1822–1899)

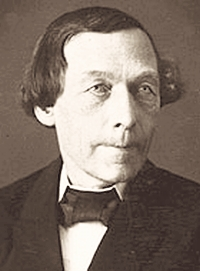
William Nylander (1885)

William Nylander (3 January 1822 – 29 March 1899) was a Finnish botanist and lichenologist, the first professor of botany at the University of Helsinki, and one of the foremost lichen researchers of the 19th century. He devoted most of his scientific career to the systematics of lichens and was the first to consistently apply microscopy and chemical reagents to lichen taxonomy. In 1863 he settled in Paris, where he worked as an independent researcher until his death.

== Early life and education ==
William Nylander was born in Oulu; his father was an alderman and merchant, his mother belonged to a family of priests. Already during his studies, Nylander became interested in natural science and travelled around Finland collecting insects. He enrolled at the University of Helsinki in 1839 and took several academic degrees, including a Bachelor of Arts in 1843, a Master of Arts in 1844, a Licentiate in 1845, and a Doctor of Medicine and Surgery in 1847. He chose not to practise medicine, as his interest in natural science led him first to entomology and zoology and then to botany.

His earliest works dealt with entomology and were considered important contributions to the knowledge of Nordic ants and wasps. He then turned exclusively to botany and devoted himself almost entirely to the systematics of lichens.

== Career in France and Helsinki ==
Nylander made several trips abroad and spent the years 1850–1858 in Paris on scholarships, where he developed a new system for the classification of lichens. He published Essai d'une nouvelle classification des lichens (1854–1855), Herbarium lichenum parisiensium (1853–1856), Prodromus lichenographiæ Galliæ et Algeriæ (1857, awarded a prize by the Académie nationale des sciences, belles-lettres et arts in Bordeaux), Énumération générale des lichens avec l'indication sommaire de leur distribution géographique (1858), and his most extensive work, Synopsis methodica lichenum omnium hucusque cognitorum, I (1858–1860, continued in 1886 but left unfinished). The planned magnum opus was abandoned as too much new material kept arriving.

In 1856 Nylander received an honorary prize and medal from the Linnaean Society of Bordeaux for his research on ants and lichens. In 1857 he became the first holder of the professorship in botany in Helsinki, and on his initiative the Societas pro Fauna et Flora Fennica began publishing its Notiser in 1858, which were the society's own scientific publications, funded by the Finnish Society of Sciences and Letters. He was active in the society as vice-chairman and as curator of its entomological collections. Together with Thiodolf Saelan, he compiled the Herbarium musei fennici (1859), cataloguing the Finnish plants and fungi in the university's collections and sketching the basis for a natural-historical division of Finland's landscapes. One of Nylander's main works dates from this period: Lichenes Scandinaviæ (1861, in Notiser).

== Life in Paris ==
In 1863, after holding his professorship for six years – half of which he had spent on leave – Nylander resigned and settled permanently in Paris. He cited Helsinki's peripheral location, the narrow atmosphere of a small city, health reasons, and the university's dismissive attitude towards his discipline. He lived at first in considerable poverty, without regular income or employment. He occasionally helped organise and identify the lichen collection at the Jardin des Plantes, but these engagements were cut short by scientific disputes.

Over time Nylander built up an extensive lichen collection containing not only the type specimens he had described as new to science but also valuable specimens from researchers around the world. He bequeathed the collection and his library to the Botanical Museum of the University of Helsinki and from 1878 received a modest pension from the Finnish state. He also sold and exchanged exsiccata – reference collections of dried lichens – to supplement his income.

One of Nylander's most faithful connections to Finland was his last student from the Helsinki years, the later professor of botany Johan Petter Norrlin, whose lichen specimens Nylander used to describe numerous new species. Together they published Herbarium lichenum Fenniae, Finland's first lichen exsiccatum.

Nylander fell into conflict with most researchers he came into contact with. His distrust, intolerance of criticism, and stubborn insistence on his own views damaged his relationships and eventually his scientific reputation. His last years were spent in complete isolation, and he died alone at his desk at the age of 77. News of his death reached Helsinki only several days after his modest funeral.

== Scientific contributions ==
Nylander was the first to consistently and comprehensively apply the microscope to systematic lichenology. He pioneered the use of chemical reagents – such as potassium hydroxide, tinctures of iodine, and calcium hypochlorite – for lichen taxonomy, techniques still used by lichenologists as the K and C tests. He observed the chemical differences between lichen species and placed them on equal footing with morphological and anatomical characteristics, an approach that has since developed into a distinct branch of lichen research.

He published articles in various scientific journals and in the publications of learned societies, mainly in France and Germany, and gained particular importance for his investigation of the previously neglected exotic lichens. The French Academy of Sciences awarded him the Prix Desmazières in 1869 for his work on the lichens of New Granada and New Caledonia.

Nylander strongly opposed the theory advanced by Simon Schwendener and Jean-Baptiste Édouard Bornet that lichens are composite organisms consisting of an alga and a fungus, but his resistance did not prevail.

Nylander observed that air pollution impeded lichen growth and that lichens could be used to measure air quality. His work on the flora of the Helsinki region and Karelia has been regarded as the starting point for floristic research in Finland.

He was one of the most prolific authors of new fungal and lichen species, having formally described about 3,700 in his career. His lichen collection of over 51,000 specimens at the Finnish Museum of Natural History remains in active use. The total number of his lichenological publications exceeded 300, comprising more than 4,000 pages.

The lichen species Umbilicaria nylanderiana was named after Nylander by Austrian botanist Alexander Zahlbruckner in 1927.
