= Geneva Sayre =

American botanist (1911-1992)

- Born: June 12, 1911; Guthrie Center, Iowa
- Died: May 26, 1992 (aged 80); Northampton, Massachusetts
- Education: Grinnell College; University of Wyoming; University of Colorado
- Known for: leading expert on Grimmia
- Scientific career
- Fields: Bryology
- Workplaces: University of Colorado Boulder; Russell Sage College; Farlow Herbarium
- Author abbrev. (botany): Sayre

Geneva Sayre (June 12, 1911, Guthrie Center, Iowa – May 26, 1992, Northampton, Massachusetts) was an American bryologist and bibliographer. She "pioneered bibliographical and historical bryology, a new field in the study, evaluation, and organization of the literature of bryology."

== Biography ==
Sayre graduated in 1933 with a bachelor's degree from Grinnell College, where she was taught botany by Henry Conard. She graduated in 1935 with an M.A. from the University of Wyoming and in 1938 with an Ph.D. at the University of Colorado Boulder, where she worked as an instructor until 1940.

At Russell Sage College, Sayre was a faculty member from 1940 to 1972, when she retired as professor emerita. In 1972 she became a research associate at Harvard University's Farlow Library and Herbarium of Cryptogamic Botany. There she trained curatorial assistants in the conservation and systematization of cryptogamic collections and scientifically inventoried 19th-century bryological collections. In 1981 a volume in honor of her 70th birthday was published by the Farlow Herbarium of Cryptogamic Botany. In 1981 her friends and colleagues established the Geneva Sayre Fund to support visiting scholars studying at the Farlow Herbarium.

As a bryologist, Sayre was a leading expert on the moss genus Grimmia. In order to clarify the taxonomic nomenclature of the mosses, in 1959 she privately published Dates of Publications Describing Musci, 1801-1821.

With help from the National Science Foundation, Sayre collected information relating to published sets (exsiccatae) of cryptogams, especially bryophytes and she gathered bibliographical and biographical information about bryological collectors, such as Sullivant, James, Austin, and Taylor. The results of her research, Cryptogamae Exsiccatae, was published from 1969-1975 as five series.

She was the president of American Bryological and Lichenological Society from 1951 to 1953. In 1983 the International Association of Bryologists awarded the Hedwig Medal to Sayre (and to Yoshinori Asakawa) for lifetime achievement in bryology.

At the end of WW II she organized the sending of food, clothes, money, books, and scientific equipment to distressed bryologists in Germany and other European countries.

Aside from her scientific involvements, Sayre was also interested in local history. She lived in an 18th-century house with her long-time companion, Ruth Z. Temple, in Chesterfield, Massachusetts. She served as President of the Historical Society, as Curator of the Edwards Memorial Museum, and as Chairman of the Chesterfield Historical Commission.

== Selected publications ==
- Sayre, Geneva (1959). Dates of Publications Describing Musci, 1801-1821. Troy, New York: privately published; 106 pp.
- —— (1971). Cryptogamae Exsiccatae: An Annoted Bibliography of Published Exsiccatae of Algae, Lichenes, Hepaticae, and Musci. Bryophyta. Bronx, New York: New York Botanical Garden; 102 pages
- —— (1984). Index to the moss herbarium of William Starling Sullivant (1803-1873). Cambridge, Mass., U.S.: Farlow Herbarium, Harvard University; iii+117 pages
