= Platyhypnum molle =

Scientific classification
- Kingdom: Plantae
- Division: Bryophyta
- Class: Bryopsida
- Subclass: Bryidae
- Order: Hypnales
- Family: Amblystegiaceae
- Genus: Platyhypnum
- Species: P. molle

Binomial name
- Platyhypnum molle (Hedw.) Loeske

Synonyms
- Hypnum molle Hedw.

Species of moss

Platyhypnum molle, the soft brook-moss, is a species of moss belonging to the family Amblystegiaceae.

It is native to Europe and Northern America.
