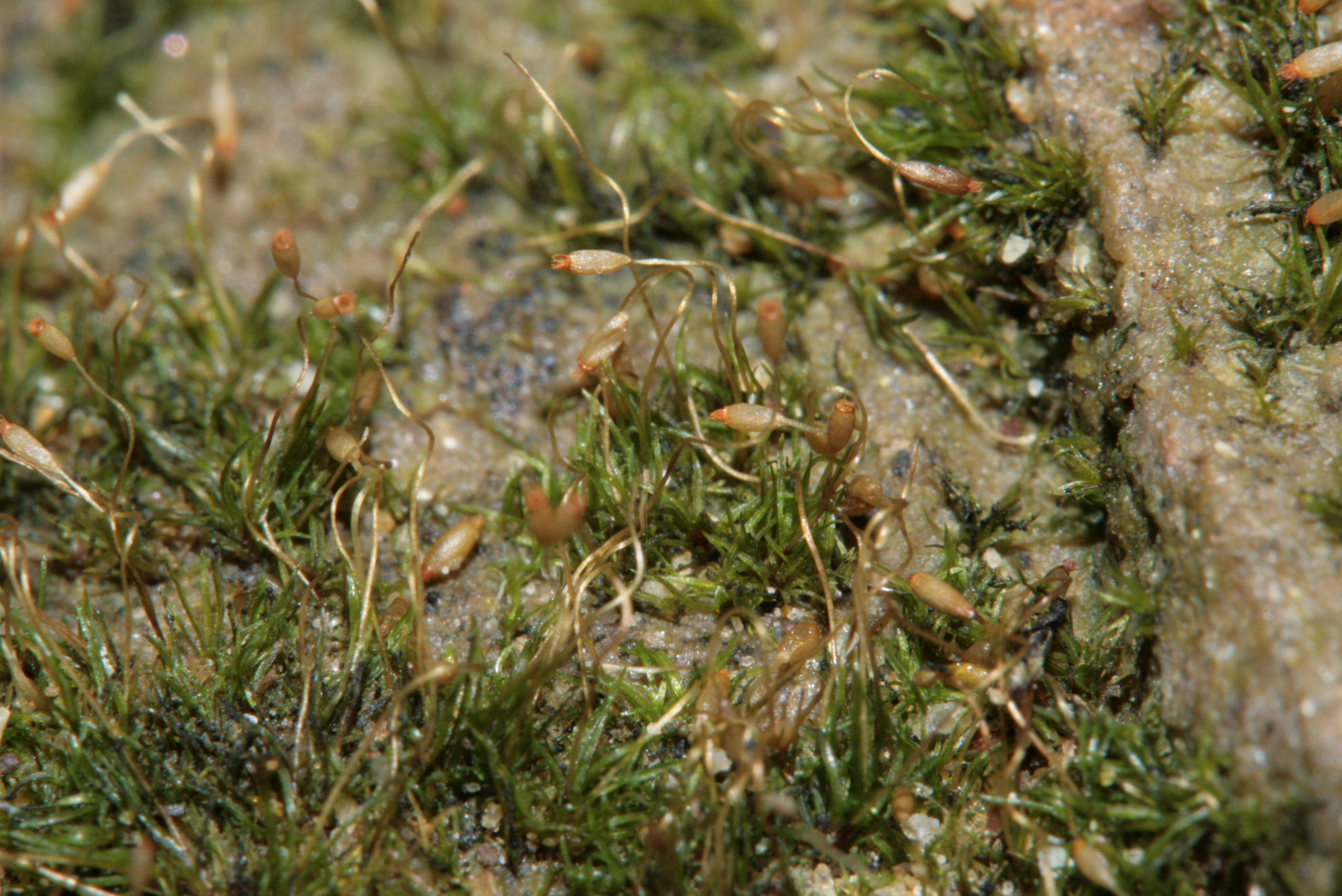
- Campylostelium saxicola

Scientific classification
- Kingdom: Plantae
- Division: Bryophyta
- Class: Bryopsida
- Subclass: Dicranidae
- Order: Grimmiales
- Family: Ptychomitriaceae

Genera
- See text

= Ptychomitriaceae =

Family of mosses

Ptychomitriaceae is a family of mosses in the subclass Dicranidae.

== Genera ==
The family contains six genera.

- Aligrimmia R. S. Williams
- Campylostelium Bruch & Schimp.
- Indusiella Broth. & Müll. Hal.
- Jaffueliobryum Thér.
- Ptychomitriopsis Dixon
- Ptychomitrium Fürnr.
