= Tottan Hills =

Hill range in Antarctica

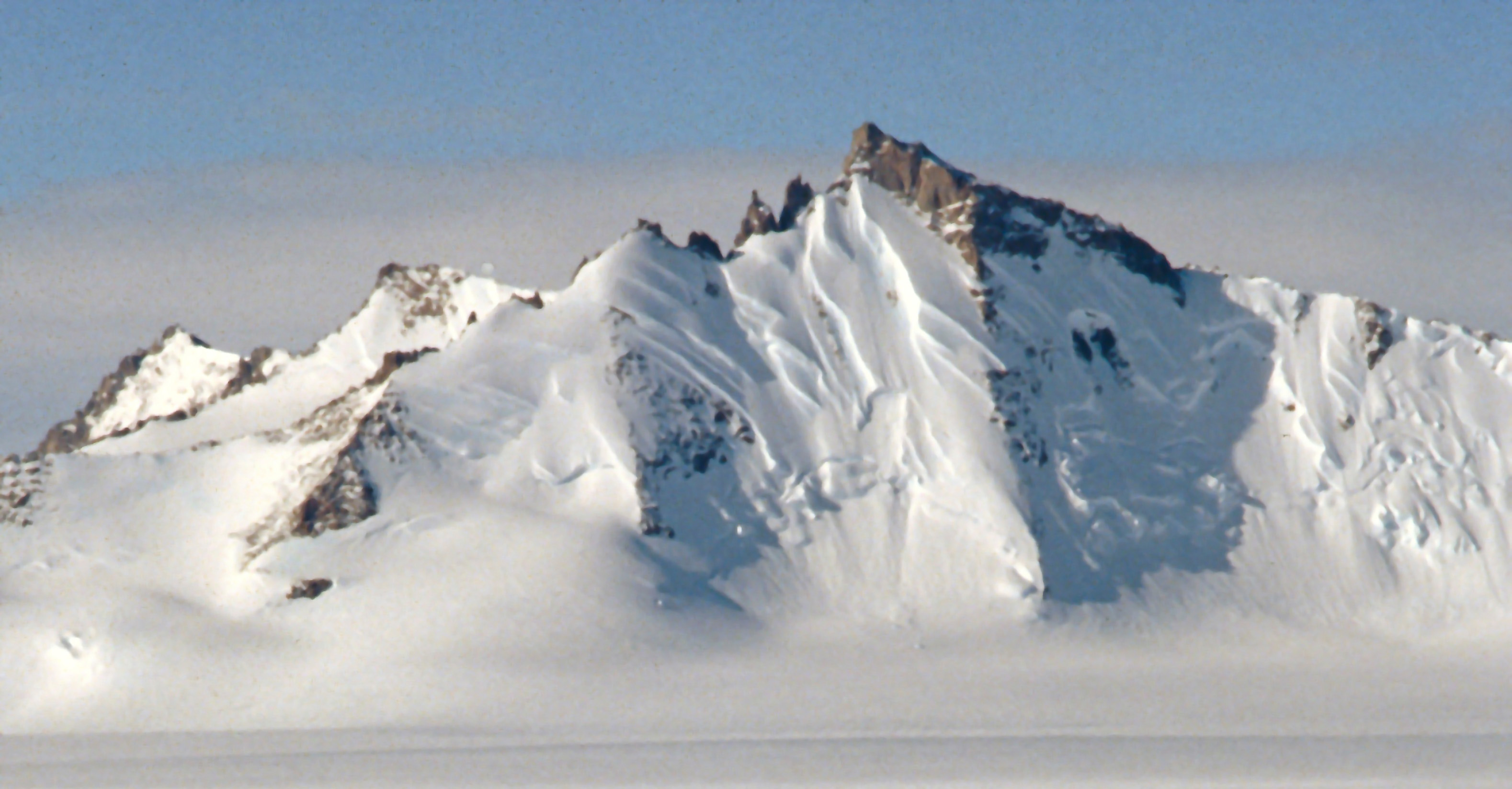
Johnsonhogna (2220 m), the highest mountain of Tottanfjella. View in NE direction.

Tottan Hills (75°2′S 12°25′W) is a group of rocky hills 20 nautical miles (37 km) in extent, forming the southwestern portion of Heimefront Range in Queen Maud Land. The hills were observed and photographed by the Norwegian-British-Swedish Antarctic Expedition in the course of air reconnaissance from Maudheim in January 1952. Named after the supply ship Tottan, used to establish and resupply the British Royal Society IGY station on the Brunt Ice Shelf, 1955–58. During the 1957–58 season, Tottan also unloaded supplies at Norway station on Princess Martha Coast.
