= Ryszard Ochyra =

Polish bryologist (born 1949)

Ryszard Ochyra (born 1949) is a Polish bryologist. He has focused on moss systematics of the Southern Hemisphere, specifically in the families Amblystegiaceae, Dicranaceae, Grimmiaceae, and Seligeriaceae. Throughout his career, he has described 48 species of moss considered new to science.

== Biography ==
Ochyra was born on 10 September 1949 in Rozbórz, Poland. He studied biology at Jagiellonian University, and remained at the university for his post-graduate work. He obtained his master's degree in botany in 1972 while studying under Jan Kornaś, and earned his doctorate in 1976.

He took part in the Fourth Antarctic Expedition of the Polish Academy of Sciences, where he studied bryology on King George Island from 1979 to 1980. He was based on Henryk Arctowski Polish Antarctic Station.

In 1986, Ochyra married Halina Bednarek-Ochyra, a noted bryologist and botanist. Together they have undertook several bryological expeditions and made large contributions to the herbarium of the Polish Academy of Sciences.

== Legacy ==
In 1986, botanist and mycologist Jiří Váňa circumscribed the moss genus Ochyraea, which is in the family Amblystegiaceae and named in Rysard's honor.

== Works ==
Between 1974 and 2019, Ochyra published 1,580 works. He has described or coauthored 48 new species of moss. Between 1978 and 2000, Ochyra co-edited and distributed five bryophyte exsiccata series, among others Musci Poloniae exsiccati, ab Instituto Botanico Academiae Scientiarum Polonae editi, Bryophyta Antarctica exsiccata and together with Tamás Pócs Bryophyta Africana selecta.
