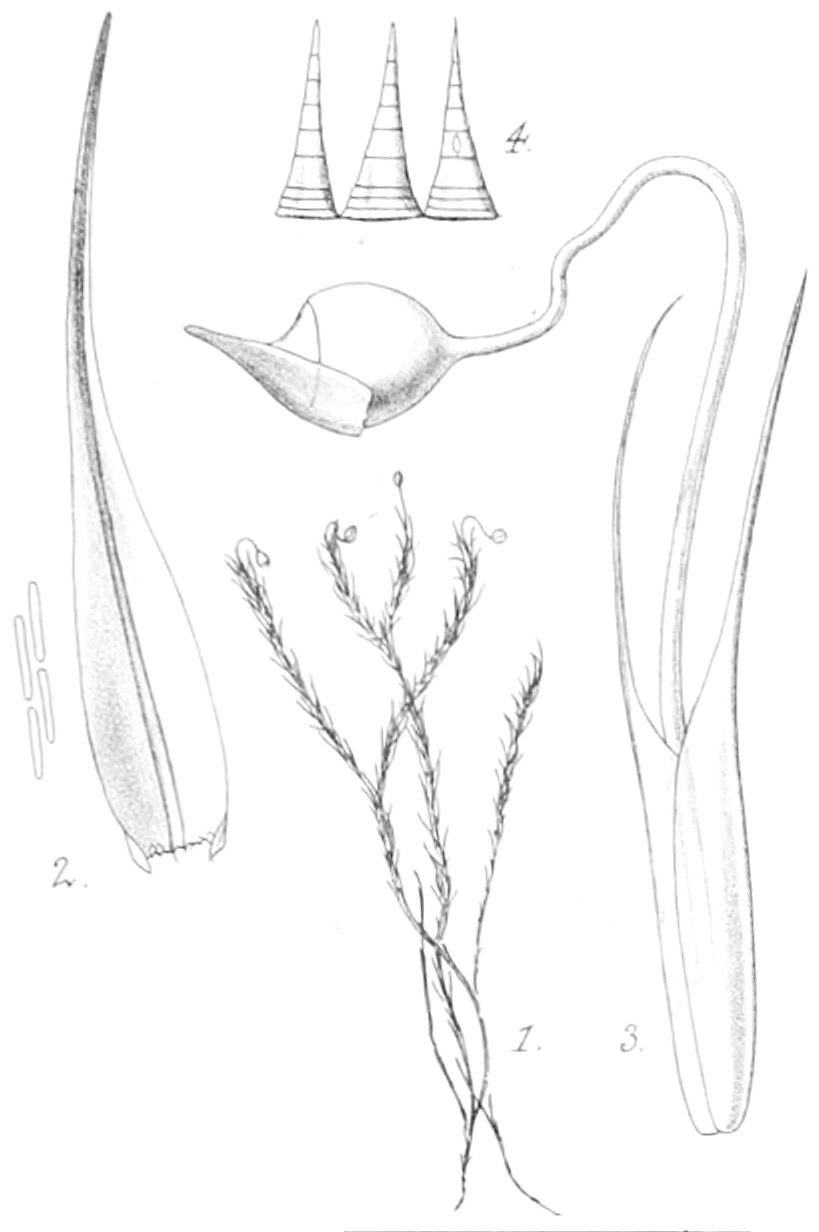
- Blindia magellanica

Scientific classification
- Kingdom: Plantae
- Division: Bryophyta
- Class: Bryopsida
- Subclass: Dicranidae
- Order: Grimmiales
- Family: Seligeriaceae

Genera
- Blindia; Brachydontium; Hymenolomopsis; Seligeria; Trochobryum; Valdonia

= Seligeriaceae =

Family of mosses

Seligeriaceae is a family of mosses in the subclass Dicranidae.
