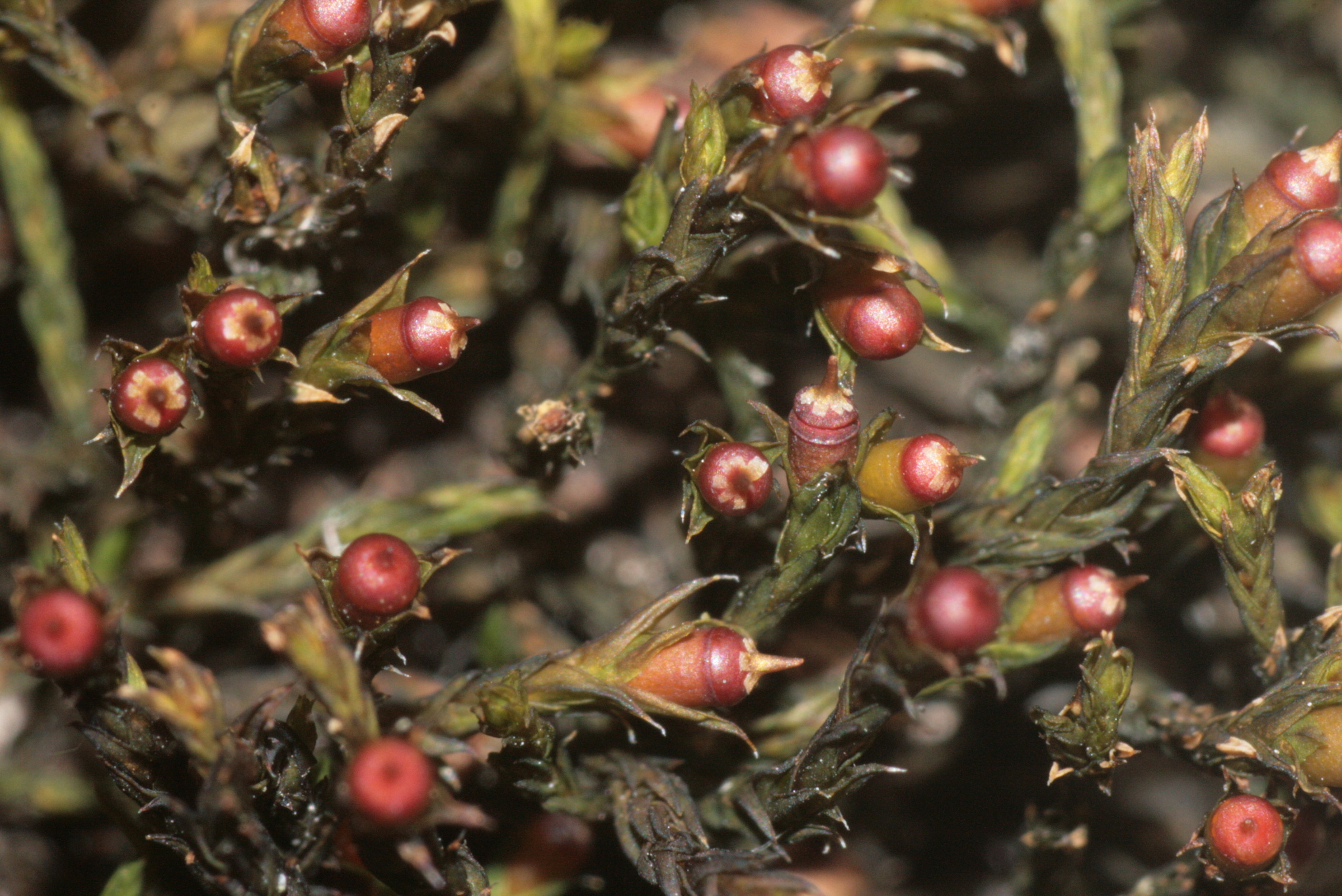
- Schistidium apocarpum

Scientific classification
- Kingdom: Plantae
- Division: Bryophyta
- Class: Bryopsida
- Subclass: Dicranidae
- Order: Grimmiales
- Family: Grimmiaceae; Arn.

Genera
- See text

= Grimmiaceae =

Grimmiaceae Temporal range: Valanginian–Present

Family of mosses

Grimmiaceae is a family of mosses in the order Grimmiales.

== Genera ==
World Flora Online lists the following genera:

- Bucklandiella Roiv.
- Codriophorus P.Beauv.
- Coscinodon Spreng.
- Grimmia Hedw.
- Guembelia Hampe
- Leucoperichaetium Magill
- Niphotrichum (Bedn.-Ochyra) Bedn.-Ochyra & Ochyra
- Racomitrium Brid.
- Schistidium Bruch & Schimp.

== Fossil record ==
A fossil species, Tricarinella crassiphylla is known from the Early Cretaceous (Valanginian ~136 million years ago) Apple Bay flora on Vancouver Island, Canada, which is the oldest known member of the Dicranidae.
