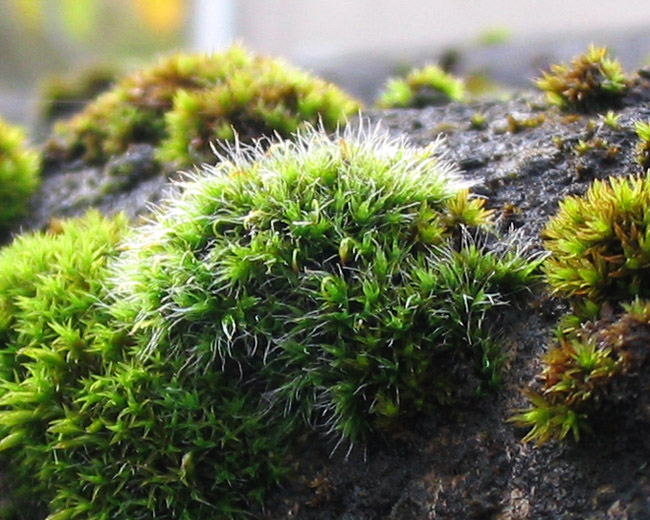
- Grimmia pulvinata

Scientific classification
- Kingdom: Plantae
- Division: Bryophyta
- Class: Bryopsida
- Subclass: Dicranidae
- Order: Grimmiales; M. Fleisch.

Families
- Grimmiaceae; Ptychomitriaceae; Seligeriaceae; Saelaniaceae

= Grimmiales =

Order of mosses

Grimmiales is an order of mosses in the subclass Dicranidae. It comprises four families: Grimmiaceae, Ptychomitriaceae, Seligeriaceae, and Saelaniaceae.
