= Knocklayd =

- Cnoc Leithid
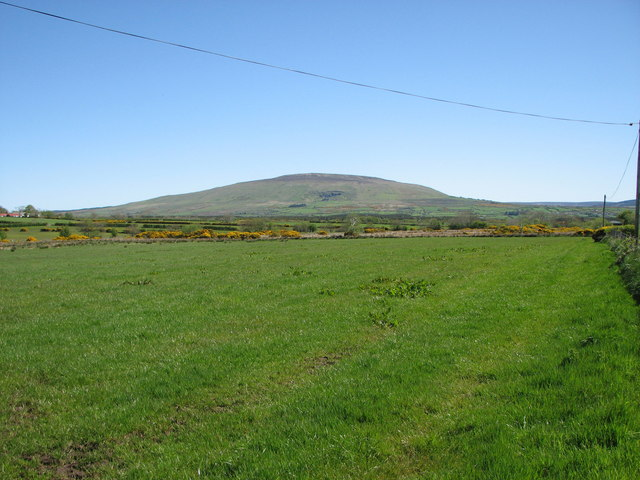
- Knocklayd from the west

Highest point
- Elevation: 1,686 ft (514 m)
- Prominence: 1,286 ft (392 m)
- Parent peak: Trostan
- Coordinates: 55.16209°N 6.25109°W

Geography
- Location within Northern Ireland
- Country: Northern Ireland
- County: Antrim
- Civil parish: Armoy
- Parent range: Antrim Hills
- OSI/OSNI grid: D115 364

Knocklayd (Irish name: Cnoc Leithid, "hill of the slope/expanse") is a peak in County Antrim, Northern Ireland, about 3 miles (5 km) due south from Ballycastle. The Irish Grid reference is D115 364.

== Geography ==
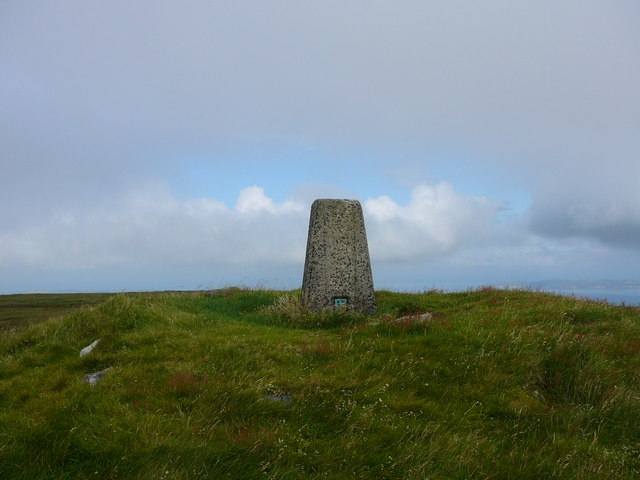
Trig point on Knocklayd

Knocklayd is the northernmost peak of the Antrim Hills, of conical shape with a height above sea level of 1686 ft (514 m) and a prominence of 1286 ft (392 m), and lies within the Antrim Coast and Glens AONB in which it is the third-highest summit. It is the second highest mountain in County Antrim after Trostan.

A trig point has been erected on the summit.

Knocklayd is remarkable for the fact that ten townlands meet in a multipoint near its summit. Clockwise from the north, these are Broom-More, Tavnaghboy, Kilrobert, Clare Mountain, Aghaleck, Corvally, Essan, Cleggan, Stroan, and Tullaghore.

== Geology ==
Knocklayd consisty chiefly of Dalradian schists and gneisses and is covered by chalk and basalt. A mica platform extends between Knocklayd and Tor Point over a distance of about 6 miles (10 km). Limestone overlay the slate and surrounds the mountain in a diameter of about 1 1/2 miles (2.5 km) and is itself covered by basalt. Quartz and chalcedony may be found on the mountain.

== Archaeology ==
Carn an Truagh ("Cairn of Woe" or "Cairn of Sorrow", also called "cairn of the three", as according to legend three Danish princesses are presumed to be buried there) surrounds the summit. It is about 4 m high and 20 m in diameter and a scheduled monument. The structure is almost certainly a passage tomb; it has never been excavated, but it is exposed in places through erosion. It consists of white quartz and is covered by peat and grass.

Knocklayd is further surrounded by several standing stones.
