= Tievebaun Mountain =

Mountain in Ireland

Tievebaun
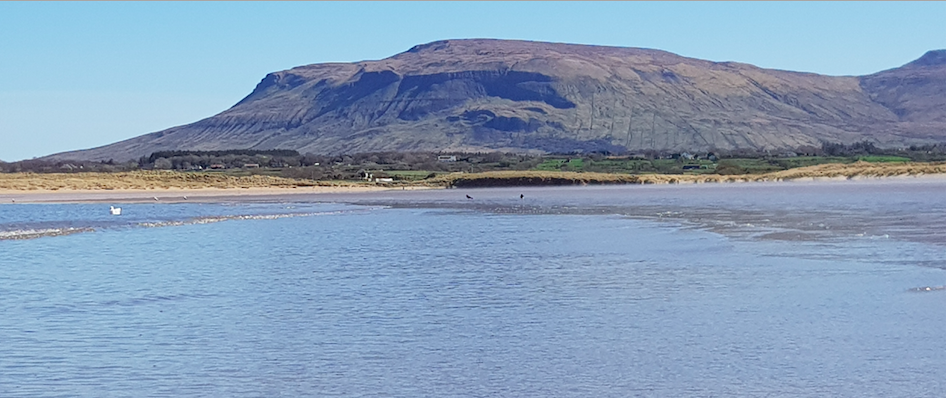
- Viewed from Mullaghmore

Highest point
- Elevation: 611 m (2,005 ft)
- Prominence: 106 m (348 ft)
- Coordinates: 54°23′50″N 8°21′26″W

Naming
- Native name: Taobh Bán

Geography
- Location within island of Ireland
- Location: Counties Leitrim and Sligo, Ireland
- Parent range: Dartry Mountains

Tievebaun (Irish: Taobh Bán, meaning 'grassy slope') is a mountain located on the border of County Leitrim and County Sligo, Ireland. Its classifications include Arderin and Vandeleur-Lynam. Its height is 611 m (2,005 ft). The mountain is notable for its cliffs as well as the pinnacles on the eastern and northern sides, such as Eagle's Rock and The Hag's Leap.

Tievebaun is the third-highest mountain in the Dartry Mountains, and ranks as the 254th highest mountain in Ireland. It is the highest independent peak in County Leitrim; however, the mountain's summit is only the second-highest point in the county, as the southeast ridge of Truskmore Mountain lies within Leitrim, at 631 m (2,070 ft).

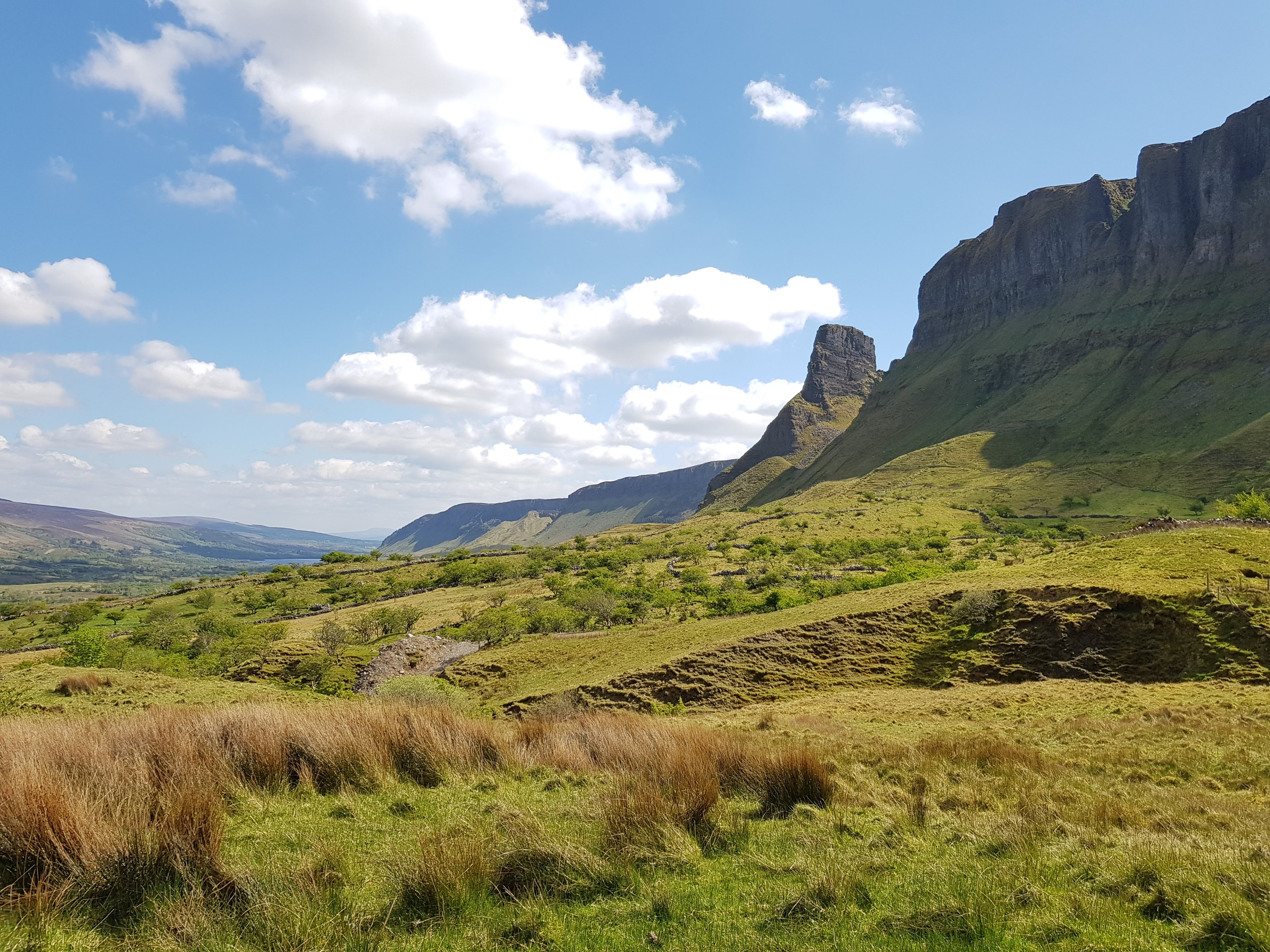
Glenade Valley with the Hag’s Leap and Eagle's Rock (right)
