= Glencar Lough =

Freshwater lake in northwest Ireland

- Loch Ghleann an Chairthe (Irish)
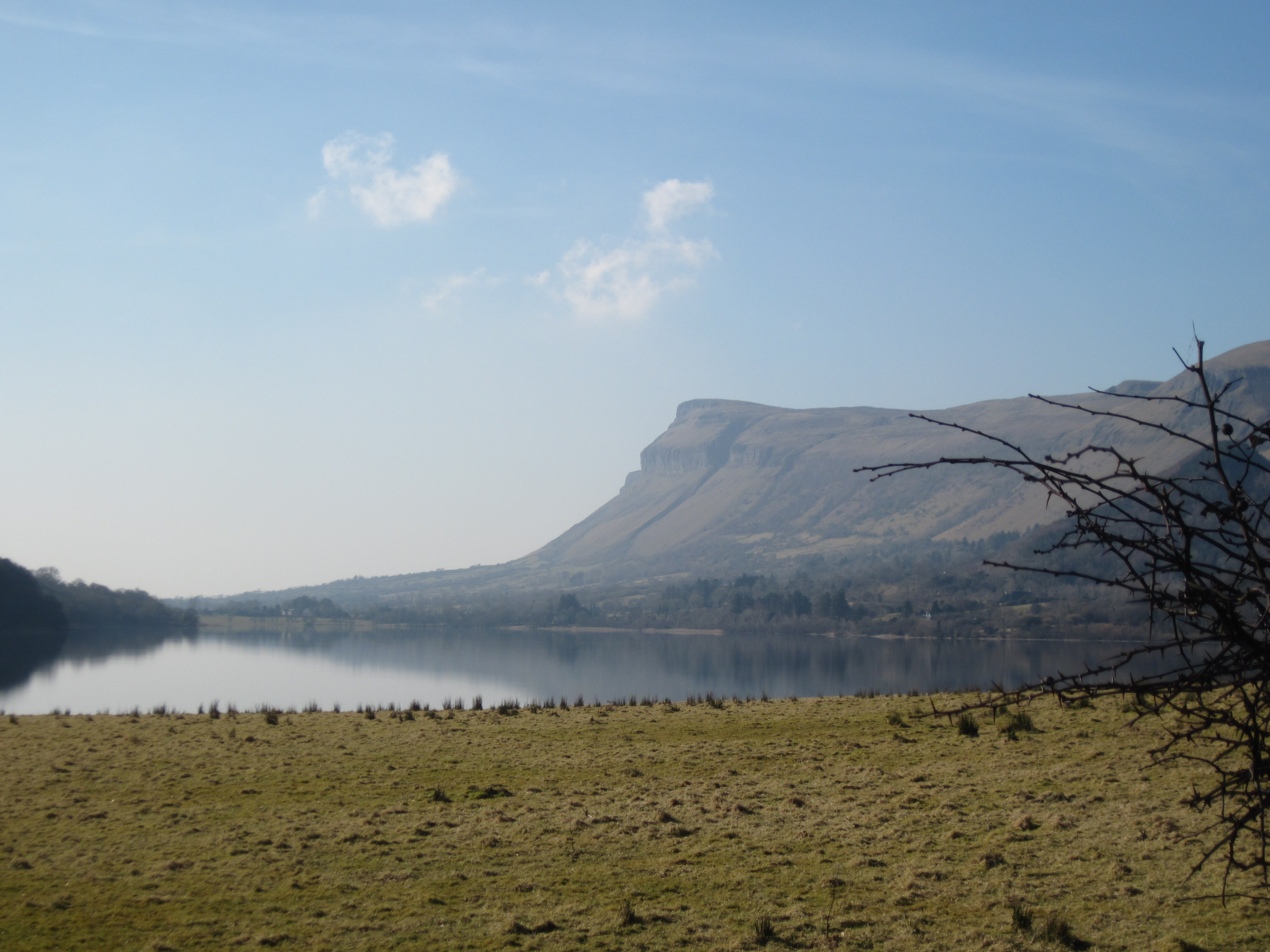
- West towards Benbulbin

- Location in Ireland
- Location: County Leitrim, County Sligo
- Coordinates: 54°20′22″N 8°23′9″W
- Lake type: Glacial lake
- Primary inflows: Glencar Waterfall, Diffreen River
- Primary outflows: Drumcliff River
- Catchment area: 41.22 km^{2} (15.92 sq mi)
- Basin countries: Ireland
- Max. length: 2.5 km (1.6 mi)
- Max. width: 0.6 km (0.37 mi)
- Surface area: 1.15 km^{2} (0.44 sq mi)
- Surface elevation: 28 m (92 ft)

Glencar Lough (Irish: Loch Ghleann an Chairthe, meaning 'lake of the glen of the pillar stone'), locally known as Glencar Lake, is a freshwater lake in the northwest of Ireland. It covers an area of 1.15 square kilometres (284 acres) and lies mostly in County Leitrim with a smaller part in County Sligo. Glencar Waterfall is located near the lake's north shore on the Leitrim side.

== Geography ==
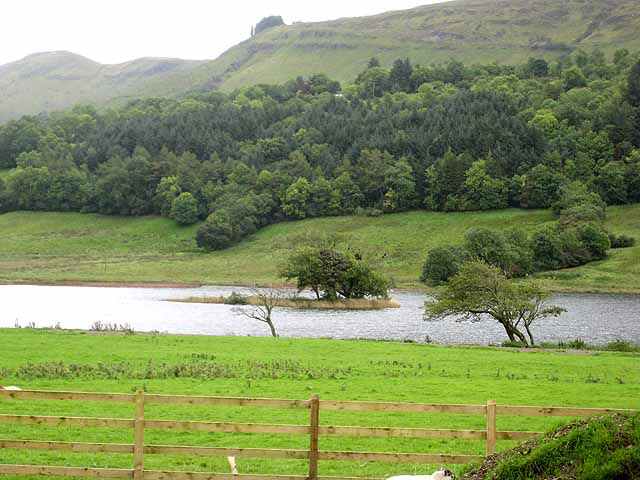
Crannog at eastern end

Glencar Lough lies in the Glencar Valley, between the Dartry Mountains to the north and the mountain range including Cope's Mountain to the south. The lake is located about 10 kilometres (6 mi) northeast of Sligo and about fifteen kilometres (9 mi) west of Manorhamilton. It is 2.5 km (1.6 mi) long from west to east and 0.6 km (0.4 mi) wide. The lake has two crannogs (artificial islands): one at the western end near the Drumcliff River outlet and the other at the eastern end near the Diffreen River.

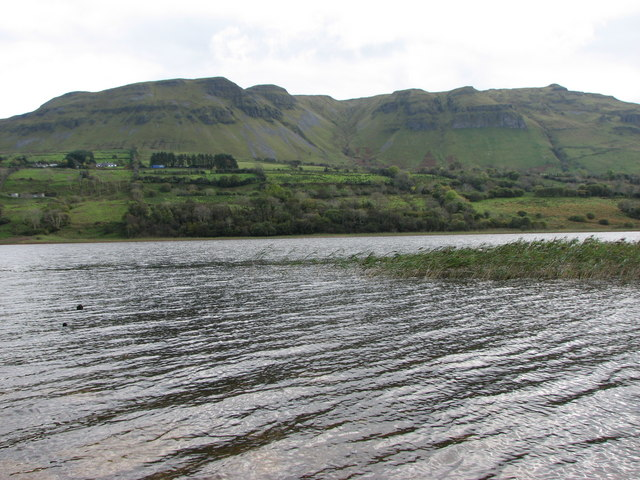
South towards Cope's Mountain

== Hydrology ==
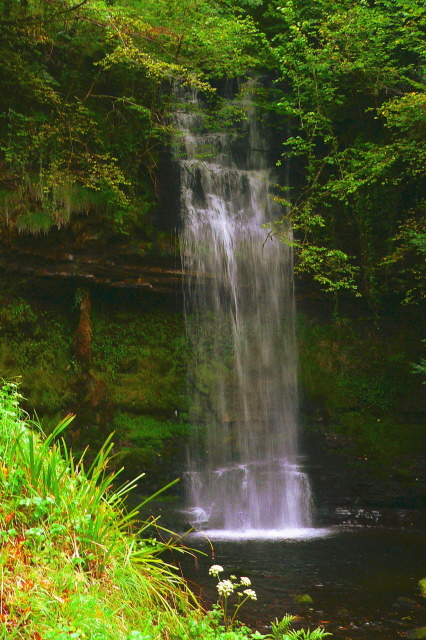
Glencar Waterfall

Glencar Lough is primarily fed by Glencar Waterfall, on the lake's northern shore, and by the Diffreen River, entering at the lake's eastern end. Sruth in Aghaidh an Aird also flows out to the northern shore, just west of the Glencar Waterfall outflow. The lake drains west into the Drumcliff River, which in turn flows into Sligo Bay. Lake depth is greatest near the southern shore with a shallower shelf at the northern shore.

== Natural history ==
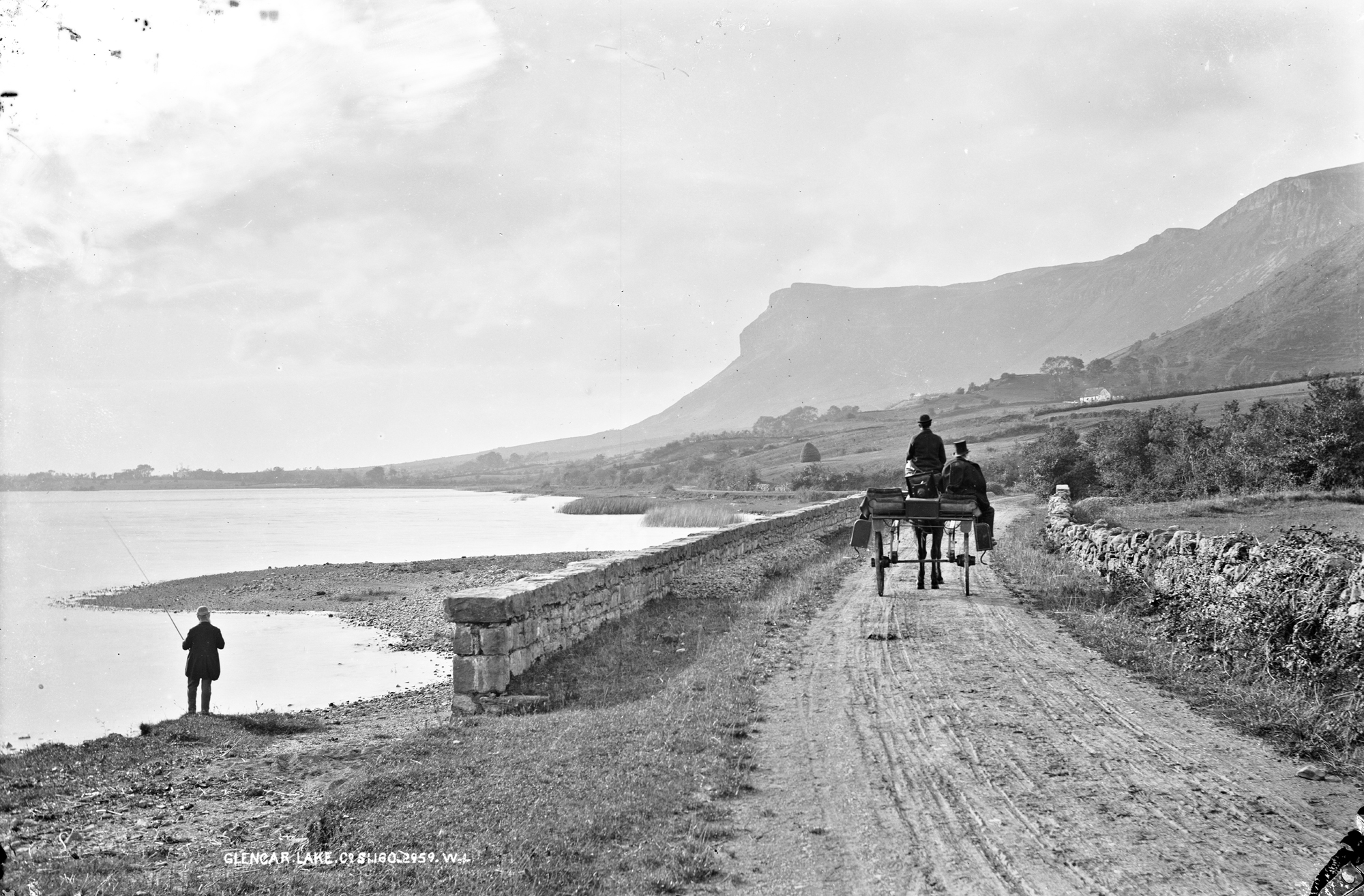
Photo by Robert French, taken before 1914

Fish present in Glencar Lough include salmon and brown trout. Bird life includes tufted duck, pochard and goldeneye. These are migratory species that winter at the lake.

== Ecology ==
The water quality was reported to be excellent c. 2001 – c. 2003 with an oligotrophic rating. (Note: Trophic states of "Oligotrophic" and "Mesotrophic" are desirable, but freshwater lakes rated 'Eutrophic' or 'Hypertrophic' indicates pollution.) The ecology of Glencar Lough, and other Irish waterways, remains threatened by curly waterweed, zebra mussel, and freshwater clam invasive species.

== History ==
Historically, Glencar Valley was known as Glenn-Dallain and was part of the Kingdom of Breifne. The lake and its crannogs, then occupied, are mentioned in the Annals of the Four Masters, specifically the eastern crannog where "the sons of Donough O'Rourke, i.e., Donnell and Ferganainm, made an attack upon the crannog, and privately set fire to the town".

== Economy ==
Barite was mined at Glencarbury in the Dartry Mountains above the lake between 1894 and 1979. A cable ropeway from the mine area to the lake shore was constructed in 1942. By this means, the extracted barite was taken down for onward road transport.

The Glencar Water Company has its bottling plant located near the lake's northern shore. The company, established in 2008, sells water drawn from an onsite spring emanating from within the nearby Dartry Mountains.

== In popular culture ==
- In the 2018 novel Normal People by Sally Rooney, which is partly set in Sligo, the two main characters visit Glencar waterfall and Strandhill in the 'July 2014' chapter.

== See also ==
- List of loughs in Ireland

== References and notes ==
=== Secondary sources ===
- Clenaghan, Conor; Clinton, Frank; Crowe, Matthew (2005). Phosphorus Regulations National Implementation Report (PDF) (Report). Environmental Protection Agency, Office of Environmental Enforcement.
- Pedreschi, D.; Kelly-Quinn, M.; Caffrey, J; O'Grady, M.; Mariani, S.; Phillimore, A. (2014), "Genetic structure of pike (Esox lucius) reveals a complex and previously unrecognized colonization history of Ireland", Journal of Biogeography, 41 (3), Journal of Biogeography, 41(3), 548–560.: 548–560, doi:10.1111/jbi.12220, PMC 4238397, PMID 25435649
