= List of Irish counties by highest point =

Irish county and provincial tops

Provinces of Ireland

This is a list of Irish counties by their highest point. These are most commonly known as county high points but are also sometimes referred to as county tops and county peaks. There are 32 counties in Ireland but in the case of 10 counties, marked with (‡), the highest point is shared between two counties, so there are only 27 distinct Irish county high points. This list is generated from the Irish MountainViews Online Database (October 2018 edition). The overall ranking of an Irish County High Point against all other peaks in Ireland is based on the Vandeleur-Lynam definition where a peak must have a minimum topographic prominence of 15 metres (49 ft) to be on the list of peaks in Ireland. The four Irish provincial tops, also referred to as province high points, are also listed. The listings of Irish county high points under the definitions of Irish mountains (e.g. Furths, Marilyn, Arderins), are also provided.

The list of Irish county and provincial high points contains four of Ireland's five Real Munros, and 14 of Ireland's 25 P600 "Major" mountains.

Ireland's County High Points is one of 16 sub-lists, which together comprise the complete list of 188 major Irish geographical high points.

== List ==
Real Munro: Height over 3,000 feet (914 m), prominence over 150 metres (492 ft).
P600: Any height, prominence over 600 metres (1,969 ft).

# = Rank Table (Note: Ranking of the mountain or hill in this table of Ireland's highest County Tops)
H = Height

Irish County and Provincial Tops (MountainViews Online Database, (Note: MountainViews was created in 2002 by Simon Stewart as a non-profit online database for climbers in Ireland to document and catalogue their Irish climbs. Its main data feed is taken from the Ordnance Survey Ireland ("OSI"), however, it also integrates other established Irish mountain databases such as the Paul Tempan Logainm Irish Placenames Database. Collins Press published its Online Datase in 2013 in the book: A Guide to Ireland's Mountain Summits: The Vandeleur-Lynams & the Arderins. MountainViews is also partnered with the important Database of British and Irish Hills ("DoBIH"), which is the main live database for the categorisation of mountains and hills in the British Isles.) October 2018)
#	Rank Overall (Note: Ranking used by the Irish MountainViews Online Database against all Irish mountains or hills, and based on the Vandeleur-Lynam classification requiring a peak to be at least 15 metres (49 ft) in prominence.)	Name	Parent range/⁮Area	Province	County	H (m)	Prom. (m)	Isolation (Note: This is not topographic isolation, but is the distance to the nearest mountain of any height, but with a minimum prominence of 15 metres (49 ft), as per the Irish MountainViews Online Database) (m)	Topo Map	OSI/⁮OSNI Grid	Coordinates	Listing
1	1	Carrauntoohil; Highest in Munster	MacGillycuddy's Reeks	Munster	Kerry	1,039	1,039	400	78	V804 844	W 9 44 33.695; N 51 59 58.021	Real Munro, Furth, P600, Marilyn, Hewitt, Vandeleur-Lynam, Arderin, MountainViews
2	13	Lugnaquilla; Highest in Leinster	Wicklow Mountains	Leinster	Wicklow	925	905	1,700	56	T032 917	W 6 27 52.327; N 52 58 1.052	Real Munro, Furth, P600, Marilyn, Hewitt, Vandeleur-Lynam, Arderin, MountainViews
3-4	14	Galtymore‡	Galty Mountains	Munster	Limerick	918	898	1,000	74	R878 238	W 8 10 44.941; N 52 21 57.545	Real Munro, Furth, P600, Marilyn, Hewitt, Vandeleur-Lynam, Arderin, MountainViews
3-4	14	Galtymore‡	Galty Mountains	Munster	Tipperary	918	898	1,000	74	R878 238	W 8 10 44.941; N 52 21 57.545	Real Munro, Furth, P600, Marilyn, Hewitt, Vandeleur-Lynam, Arderin, MountainViews
5	19	Slieve Donard; Highest in Ulster	Mourne Mountains	Ulster	Down	850	822	1,000	29	J357 277	W 5 55 15.234; N 54 10 48.856	P600, Marilyn, Hewitt, Vandeleur-Lynam, Arderin, MountainViews
6	34	Mweelrea; Highest in Connacht	Mweelrea Mountains	Connacht	Mayo	814	779	1,500	37	L789 668	W 9 49 49.289; N 53 38 14.065	P600, Marilyn, Hewitt, Vandeleur-Lynam, Arderin, MountainViews
7-8	44	Mount Leinster‡	Blackstairs Mountains	Leinster	Carlow	794	706	1,800	68	S827 525	W 6 46 49.302; N 52 37 5.364	P600, Marilyn, Hewitt, Vandeleur-Lynam, Arderin, MountainViews
7-8	44	Mount Leinster‡	Blackstairs Mountains	Leinster	Wexford	794	706	1,800	68	S827 525	W 6 46 49.302; N 52 37 5.364	P600, Marilyn, Hewitt, Vandeleur-Lynam, Arderin, MountainViews
9	46	Knockmealdown	Knockmealdown Mountains	Munster	Waterford	792	683	900	74	S058 084	W 7 54 57.209; N 52 13 40.446	P600, Marilyn, Hewitt, Vandeleur-Lynam, Arderin, MountainViews
10	73	Kippure	Wicklow Mountains	Leinster	Dublin	757	262	3,300	56	O116 154	W 6 19 54.782; N 53 10 41.302	Marilyn, Hewitt, Vandeleur-Lynam, Arderin, MountainViews
11	76	Errigal	Derryveagh Mountains	Ulster	Donegal	751	688	1,400	1	B928 207	W 8 06 46.739; N 55 02 3.624	P600, Marilyn, Hewitt, Vandeleur-Lynam, Arderin, MountainViews
12	88	Benbaun	Twelve Bens	Connacht	Galway	729	684	900	37	L786 539	W 9 49 54.340; N 53 31 16.455	P600, Marilyn, Hewitt, Vandeleur-Lynam, Arderin, MountainViews
13	104	Knockboy	Shehy Mountains	Munster	Cork	706	685	600	85	W005 620	W 9 26 36.402; N 51 48 9.072	P600, Marilyn, Hewitt, Vandeleur-Lynam, Arderin, MountainViews
14-15	140	Sawel‡	Sperrin Mountains	Ulster	Londonderry	678	657	1,800	13	H618 973	W 7 02 22.072; N 54 49 11.082	P600, Marilyn, Hewitt, Vandeleur-Lynam, Arderin, MountainViews
14-15	140	Sawel‡	Sperrin Mountains	Ulster	Tyrone	678	657	1,800	13	H618 973	W 7 02 22.072; N 54 49 11.082	P600, Marilyn, Hewitt, Vandeleur-Lynam, Arderin, MountainViews
16-17	164	Cuilcagh‡	Breifne Mountains	Ulster	Cavan	665	570	2,600	26	H123 281	W 7 48 41.198; N 54 12 3.500	Marilyn, Hewitt, Vandeleur-Lynam, Arderin, MountainViews
16-17	164	Cuilcagh‡	Breifne Mountains	Ulster	Fermanagh	665	570	2,600	26	H123 281	W 7 48 41.198; N 54 12 3.500	Marilyn, Hewitt, Vandeleur-Lynam, Arderin, MountainViews
18	198	Truskmore	Dartry Mountains	Connacht	Sligo	647	560	500	16	G759 473	W 8 22 17.844; N 54 22 27.148	Marilyn, Hewitt, Vandeleur-Lynam, Arderin, MountainViews
19	234	Truskmore SE Cairn	Dartry Mountains	Connacht	Leitrim	631	0	500	16	G763 471	W 8 21 54.56; N 54 22 19.23	(not listed)
20	318	Slieve Foye	Cooley Mountains	Leinster	Louth	589	494	800	29&36A	J169 120	W 6 12 58.318; N 54 02 36.257	Marilyn, Arderin, MountainViews
21	353	Slieve Gullion	Ring of Gullion	Ulster	Armagh	573	478	4,300	29	J025 203	W 6 26 0.545; N 54 07 18.760	Marilyn, Arderin, MountainViews
22	420	Trostan	Antrim Hills	Ulster	Antrim	550	515	2,500	9	D179 236	W 6 09 19.313; N 55 02 44.690	Marilyn, Arderin, MountainViews
23	466	Moylussa	Slieve Bernagh	Munster	Clare	532	502	2,200	58	R648 759	W 8 31 20.488; N 52 50 0.623	Marilyn, Arderin, MountainViews
24-25	479	Arderin‡	Slieve Bloom	Leinster	Laois	527	420	1,200	54	S232 989	W 7 39 15.208; N 53 02 26.099	Marilyn, Arderin, MountainViews
24-25	479	Arderin‡	Slieve Bloom	Leinster	Offaly	527	420	1,200	54	S232 989	W 7 39 15.208; N 53 02 26.099	Marilyn, Arderin, MountainViews
26	518	Brandon Hill	South Midlands (Brandon Hill)	Leinster	Kilkenny	515	450	5,600	68	S697 402	W 6 58 26.978; N 52 30 35.161	Marilyn, Arderin, MountainViews
27	811	Seltannasaggart	Arigna Mountains	Connacht	Roscommon	428	137	600	26	G901 201	W 8 8 36; N 54 7 21	(not listed)
28	1000	Cupidstown Hill	Wicklow Mountains	Leinster	Kildare	379	54	2,600	50	O005 205	W 6 29 32.84; N 53 13 33.57	(not listed)
29	1014	Slieve Beagh	Fermanagh/ S. Tyrone	Ulster	Monaghan	373	285	800	18	H523 426	W 7 15 10.80; N 54 19 8.40	Marilyn
30	1206	Carn Clonhugh (Corn Hill)	North Midlands	Leinster	Longford	278	203	14,000	34	N187 842	W 7 42 52; N 53 48 28	Marilyn
31	1211	Slieve na Calliagh	North Midlands	Leinster	Meath	276	171	11,800	42	N586 775	W 7 06 42; N 53 44 40	Marilyn
32	1262	Mullaghmeen	North Midlands	Leinster	Westmeath	258	146	3,300	41	N469 793	W 7 17 15; N 53 45 41	(not listed)

== Gallery ==
The four Provincial Tops of Ireland
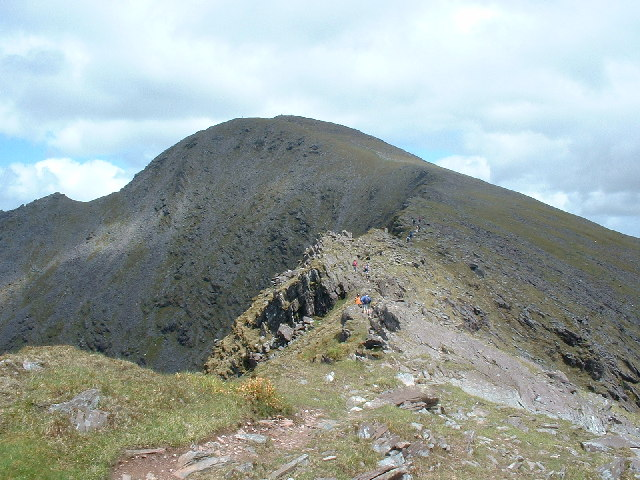
Carrauntoohil, County Kerry. Highest mountain in Munster, and highest overall in Ireland.

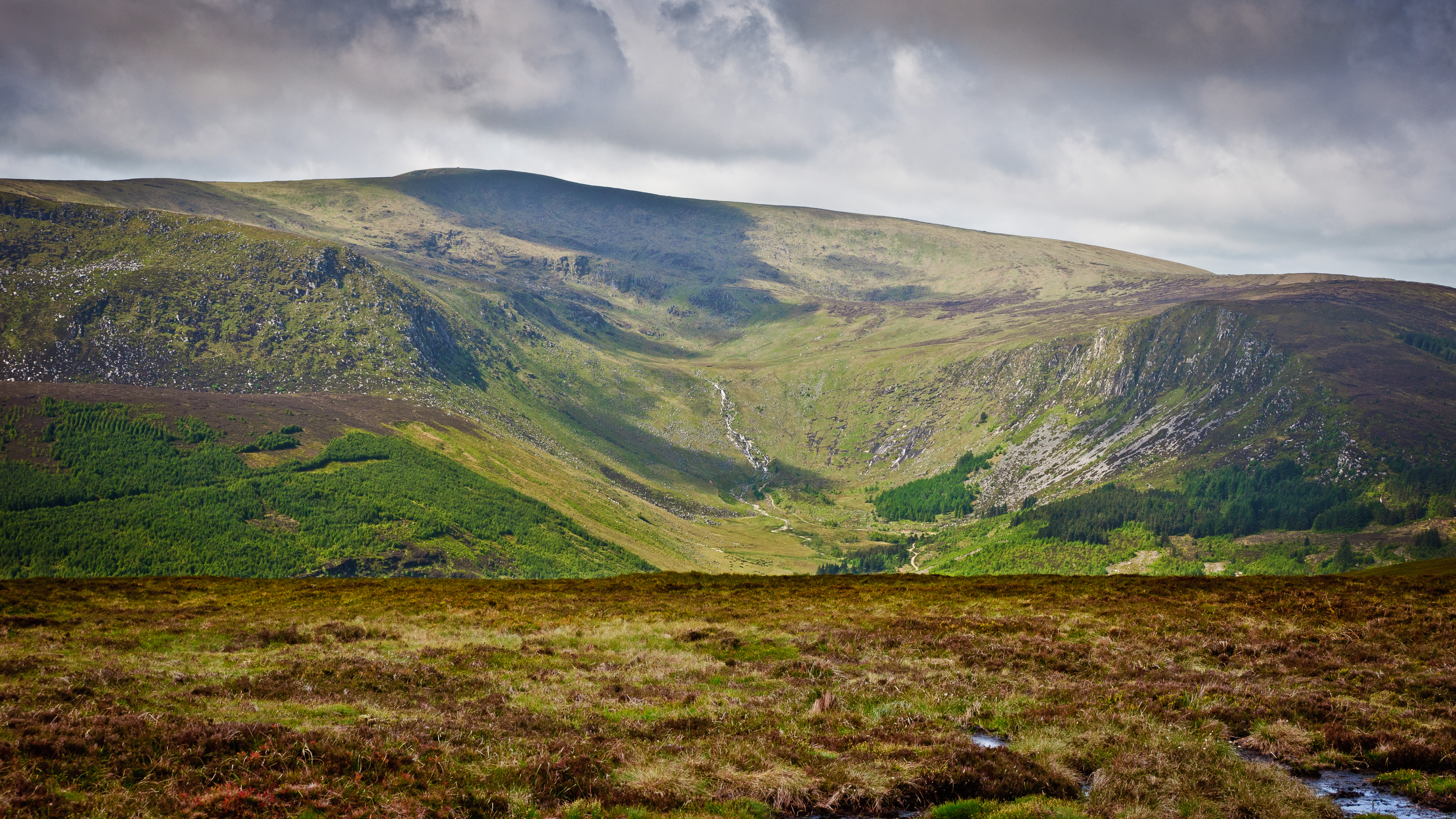
Lugnaquilla, County Wicklow. Highest mountain in Leinster, and the highest outside of Munster.

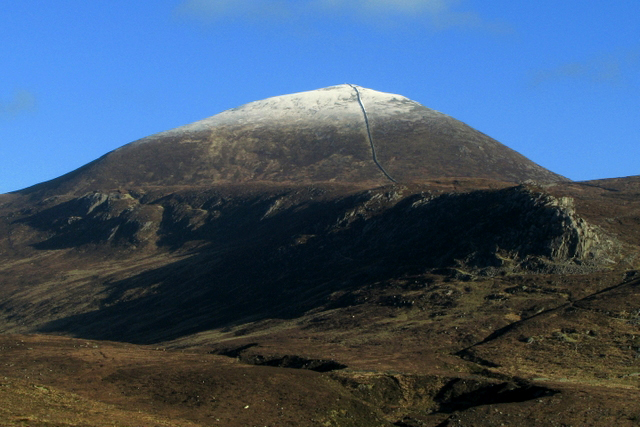
Slieve Donard, County Down. Highest mountain in Ulster and 19th highest in Ireland.

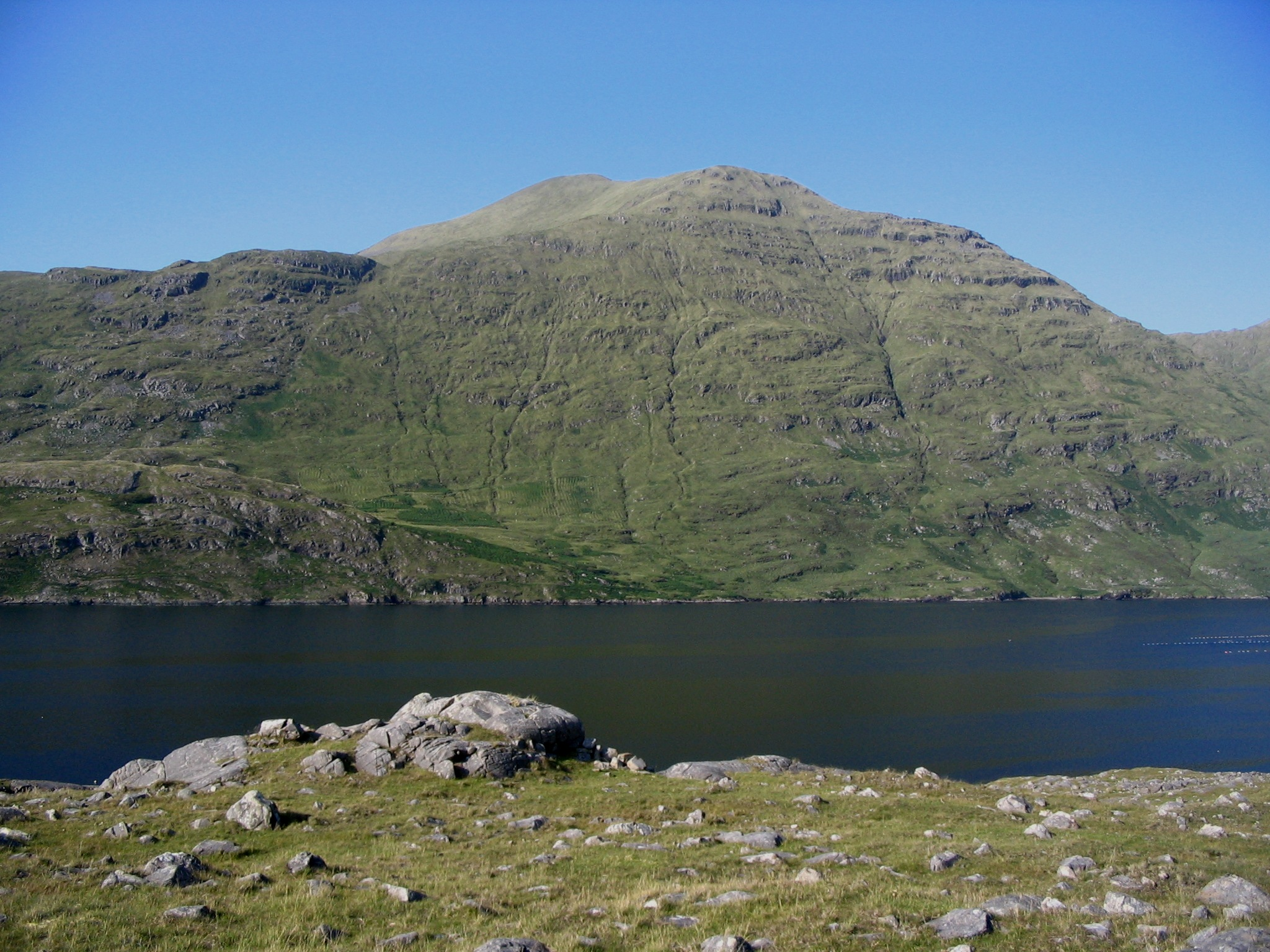
Mweelrea, County Mayo. Highest mountain in Connacht, and 34th highest in Ireland.

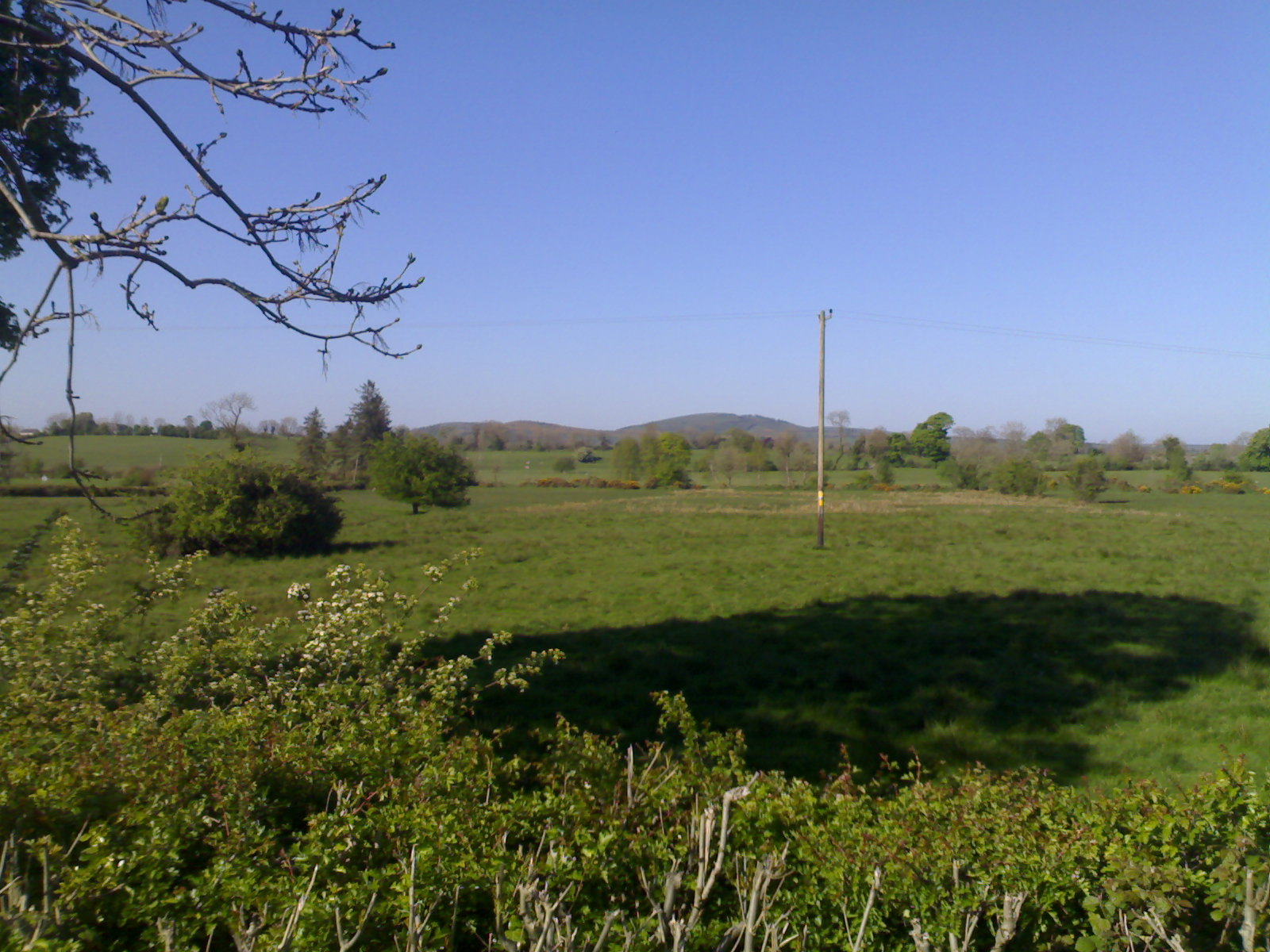
Mullaghmeen Hill in County Westmeath, the lowest of all County Tops in Ireland.

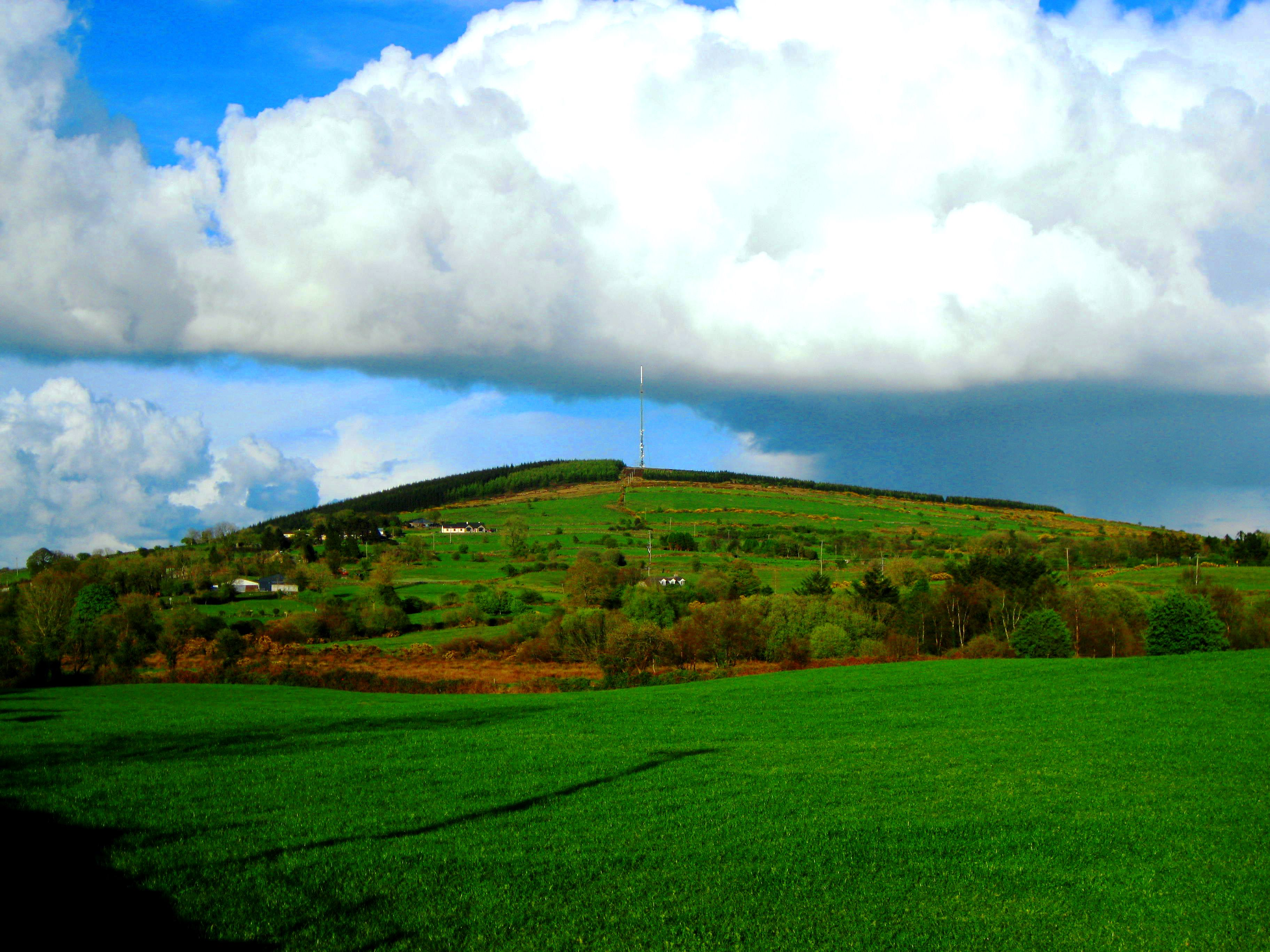
Carn Clonhugh (or Corn Hill) in County Longford, is the most isolated County Top in Ireland.

== See also ==
- List of Irish counties by area
- List of Irish counties by coastline
- Lists of mountains in Ireland
