= Sruth in Aghaidh an Aird =

Waterfall in north-west Ireland

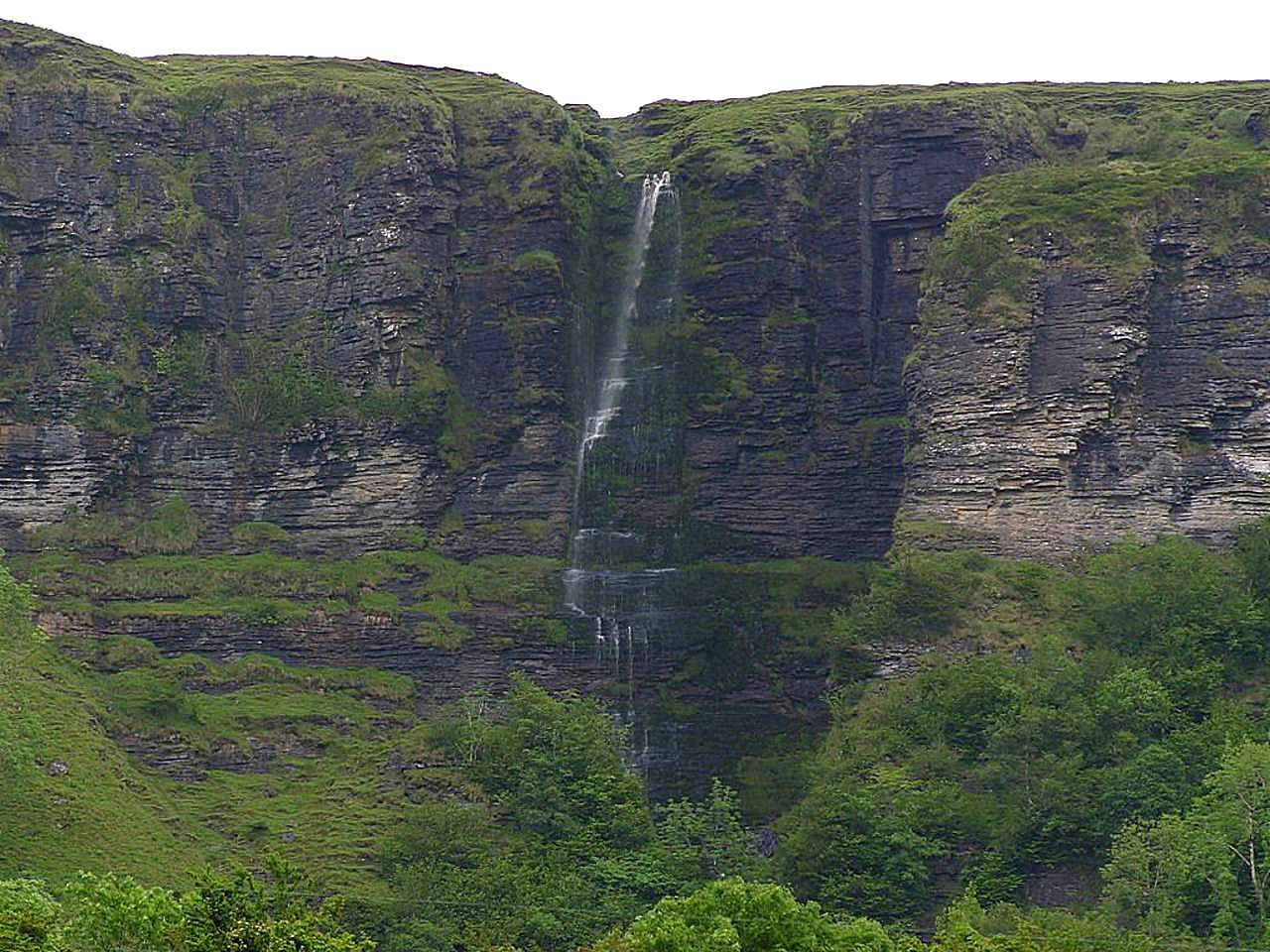
- The waterfall from Glencar Lough

- Location within island of Ireland
- Location: Counties Sligo & Leitrim, Ireland
- Coordinates: 54.347654°N 8.393123°W
- Type: Plunge
- Total height: 150 m (492 ft)
- Number of drops: 2

Sruth in Aghaidh an Aird (Irish for "stream against the height"), is Ireland’s highest waterfall, with a height of 150 metres (492 ft). It is in the Dartry Mountains in the north-west of Ireland, marking part of the border between County Sligo and County Leitrim.

It flows for around 200 days a year, from the southern side of the Darty Mountains plateau, into Glencar Lough. The waterfall's Irish name comes from the phenomenon where southerly winds sometimes blow the water backwards up and over the cliff edge. A public hiking trail has been established allowing access close to the base of the falls.

The waterfall is a prominent landmark, visible for many miles, and it formerly marked the ancient boundary of the túath of Cairbre Drom Cliabh, now the boundary between counties Sligo and Leitrim.

== See also ==
- List of waterfalls
