= Truskmore SE Cairn =

Mountain in Leitrim, Ireland

- Carn Thoir Theas Troisc Móir
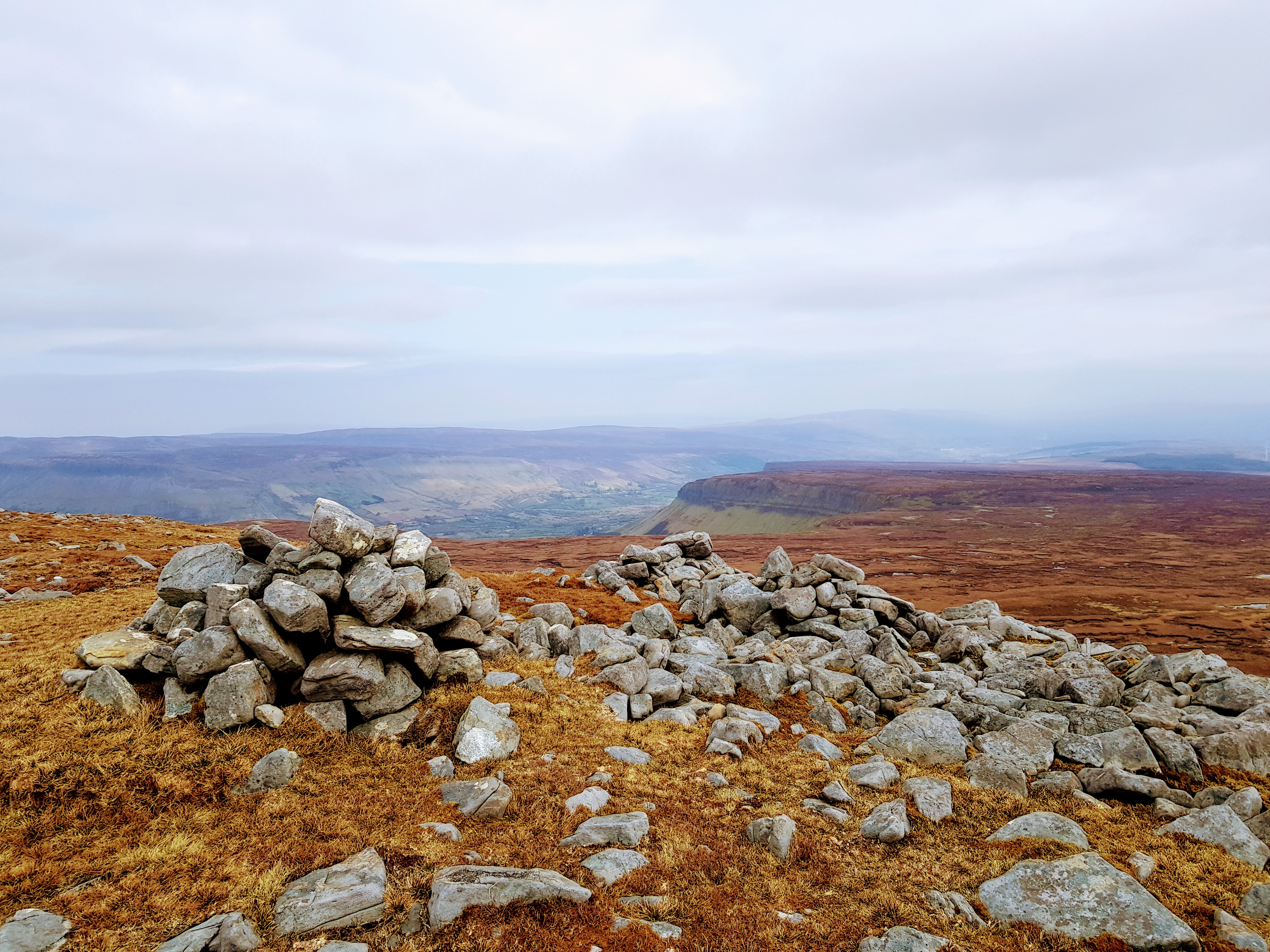
- Cairn at the summit of County Leitrim

Highest point
- Elevation: 631 m (2,070 ft)
- Prominence: 0 m (0 ft)
- Listing: County top (Leitrim)
- Coordinates: 54°22′19″N 8°21′55″W

Naming
- English translation: big cod (fish)
- Language of name: Irish

Geography
- Location within Ireland
- Location: Counties Leitrim / Sligo, Ireland
- Parent range: Dartry Mountains
- OSI/OSNI grid: G763471

Truskmore South-East Cairn is the highest point in Leitrim at 631 m (2,070 ft) above sea level. It is part of Truskmore mountain and is located approximately 0.45 km southeast of the mountain's summit, which is 16 m (52 ft) higher and located in County Sligo.

Truskmore SE Cairn's prominence is recorded as 0 m which means it appears in very few lists of mountains in Ireland. The highest independent peak in Leitrim is the nearby mountain of Tievebaun, at 611 m (2,005 ft).

== See also ==
- Truskmore
- List of Irish counties by highest point
- Lists of mountains in Ireland
- Lists of mountains and hills in the British Isles
