= Trostan =

Mountain in Northern Ireland

- Trostán
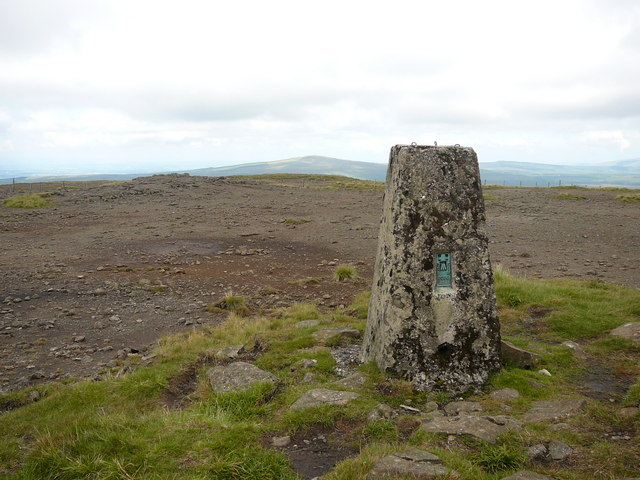
- On the summit of Trostan

Highest point
- Elevation: 551 m (1,808 ft)
- Prominence: 515 m (1,690 ft)
- Listing: County Top (Antrim), Marilyn
- Coordinates: 55°03′N 6°10′W

Naming
- English translation: pole/staff
- Language of name: Irish

Geography
- Location within Northern Ireland Location within island of Ireland Location within the United Kingdom
- Location: County Antrim, Northern Ireland
- Parent range: Antrim Hills
- Topo map: OSi Discovery 9

Geology
- Mountain type: Olivine basalt lava

Trostan (Irish: Trostán, meaning 'pole/staff') is a mountain in County Antrim, Northern Ireland and at 551 metres (1,808 feet) is the highest point in the county.

== See also ==
- Lists of mountains in Ireland
- List of Irish counties by highest point
- List of mountains of the British Isles by height
- List of Marilyns in the British Isles
