= Antrim Hills =

Mountain range in Northern Ireland

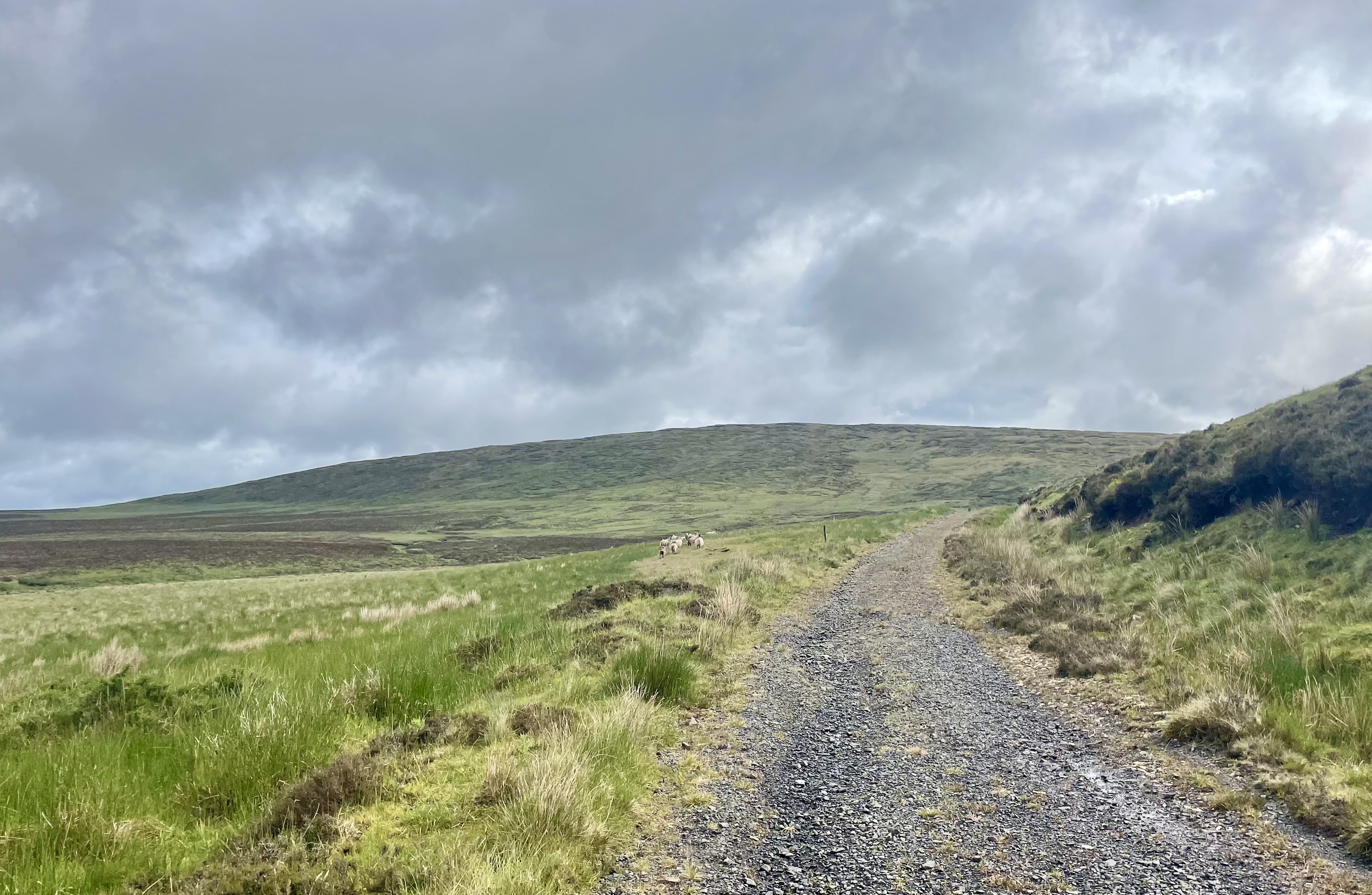
- Trostan viewed from the south-west

Highest point
- Peak: Trostan
- Elevation: 551 m (1,808 ft)

Geography
- Sovereign state: United Kingdom
- Constituent country: Northern Ireland
- Counties: County Antrim
- Range coordinates: 55°03′N 6°10′W

Geology
- Rock type(s): basalt, limestone, sandstone, dolerite, chalk

The Antrim Hills or Antrim Mountains are a mountain range in Northern Ireland. The range stretches from Ballycastle in the north, to Ballyclare and Larne in the east, in the county of Antrim. The landscape is mostly moorland and blanket bog. The region is a designated Area of Outstanding Natural Beauty.

== Features ==
It has a distinctive glaciated landscape with the mountains generally having rounded summits. Geologically, the Antrim hills are mostly formed from igneous rock such as basalt.

They are very sparsely populated and provide habitat for a diverse range of birds and mammals. Red fox, pine marten and red squirrels are commonly found alongside peregrine falcons, buzzards and sparrowhawks.

The twelve highest peaks in the Antrim Hills are listed below. Trostan climbs to 551 m (1,808 ft), the highest of the four Arderin mountains in the range and the Antrim county high-point. Divis is considered to be part of the Belfast Hills.

== List ==
Rank	Name	Irish name and meaning	Height	Prominence
1	Trostan	Trostán (pole/staff)	551 m (1,808 ft)	515 m (1,690 ft)
2	Slievenanee	Sliabh na Nia (mountain of the warriors)	543 m (1,781 ft)	98 m (322 ft)
3	Knocklayd	Cnoc Leithid (hill of the slope/expanse)	514 m (1,686 ft)	389 m (1,276 ft)
4	Slieveanorra	Sliabh an Earra (mountain of the tail/ridge)	508 m (1,667 ft)	178 m (584 ft)
5	Agnew's Hill	Cnoc Ó Gnímh (hill of Agnew)	474 m (1,555 ft)	289 m (948 ft)
6	Skerry Hill	Cnoc na Sceire (rocky hill)	459 m (1,506 ft)	46 m (151 ft)
7	Mid Hill	Cnoc Lár (middle hill)	440 m (1,440 ft)	127 m (417 ft)
8	Slemish	Sliabh Mis (mountain of Mis)	438 m (1,437 ft)	152 m (499 ft)
9	Carncormick	Carn Chormaic (Cormac's cairn)	436 m (1,430 ft)	91 m (299 ft)
10	Collin Top	Collann (high ground)	429 m (1,407 ft)	34 m (112 ft)
11	Slievenahanaghan	Sliabh na hAnachaine (mountain of mischance/disaster)	418 m (1,371 ft)	73 m (240 ft)
12	Croaghan	Cruachán (little stack)	417 m (1,368 ft)	112 m (367 ft)

== See also ==
- List of mountains in Ireland
