= Glenade Lough =

Lake in County Leitrim, Ireland

- Loch Ghleann Éada (Irish)
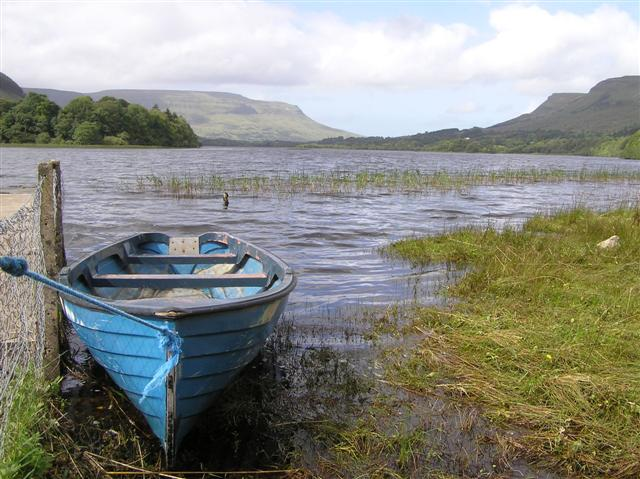

- Location in Ireland
- Location: County Leitrim
- Coordinates: 54°21′52″N 8°16′13″W
- Lake type: Glacial lake
- Primary outflows: Bonet River
- Catchment area: 15.87 km^{2} (6.1 sq mi)
- Basin countries: Ireland
- Max. length: 1.6 km (1 mi)
- Surface area: 0.74 km^{2} (0.29 sq mi)
- Average depth: 4 m (13 ft)
- Max. depth: 11.5 m (38 ft)
- Surface elevation: 66 m (217 ft)

Glenade Lough (Irish: Loch Ghleann Éada, meaning 'lake of the glen of jealousy'), locally known as Glenade Lake, is a freshwater lake in the northwest of Ireland. It is located in north County Leitrim in the Glenade Valley.

== Geography ==
Glenade Lough is situated between the Dartry Mountains to the west and the Arroo Mountain range to the east. The lake is located about 9 kilometres (6 mi) northwest of Manorhamilton and 12 km (7 mi) south of Kinlough. It is 1.6 km (1 mi) long from northwest to southeast and covers an area of 0.74 square kilometres (0.3 sq mi).

== Hydrology ==
Glenade Lough is fed by a number of streams entering at the lake's northern end. The lake drains south into the Bonet River.

== Natural history ==
Fish species in Glenade Lough include roach, perch, pike and the critically endangered European eel. The lake is also home to the white-clawed crayfish, another endangered species. Glenade Lough and its immediate surroundings were designated a Special Area of Conservation in 1997.

== Ecology ==
The water quality was reported to be satisfactory c. 2001 – c. 2003 with a mesotrophic rating. (Note: Trophic states of "Oligotrophic" and "Mesotrophic" are desirable, but freshwater lakes rated 'Eutrophic' or 'Hypertrophic' indicates pollution.) The ecology of Glenade Lough, and other County Leitrim waterways, is threatened by curly waterweed, zebra mussel, and freshwater clam invasive species.

== Legend ==
Glenade Lough is a site for the legendary beast (or cryptid) the Dobhar-chú, a very large otter-like creature believed to inhabit the lake. A gravestone in a nearby cemetery commemorates the alleged killing of a local woman by a dobhar-chú in 1722.

== See also ==
- List of loughs in Ireland

== References and notes ==
=== Secondary sources ===
- Clenaghan, Conor; Clinton, Frank; Crowe, Matthew (2005). Phosphorus Regulations National Implementation Report (PDF) (Report). Environmental Protection Agency, Office of Environmental Enforcement.
- Pedreschi, D.; Kelly-Quinn, M.; Caffrey, J; O'Grady, M.; Mariani, S.; Phillimore, A. (2014), "Genetic structure of pike (Esox lucius) reveals a complex and previously unrecognized colonization history of Ireland", Journal of Biogeography, 41 (3), Journal of Biogeography, 41(3), 548–560.: 548–560, doi:10.1111/jbi.12220, PMC 4238397, PMID 25435649
