= Truskmore =

Mountain in Sligo, Ireland

- Trosc Mór
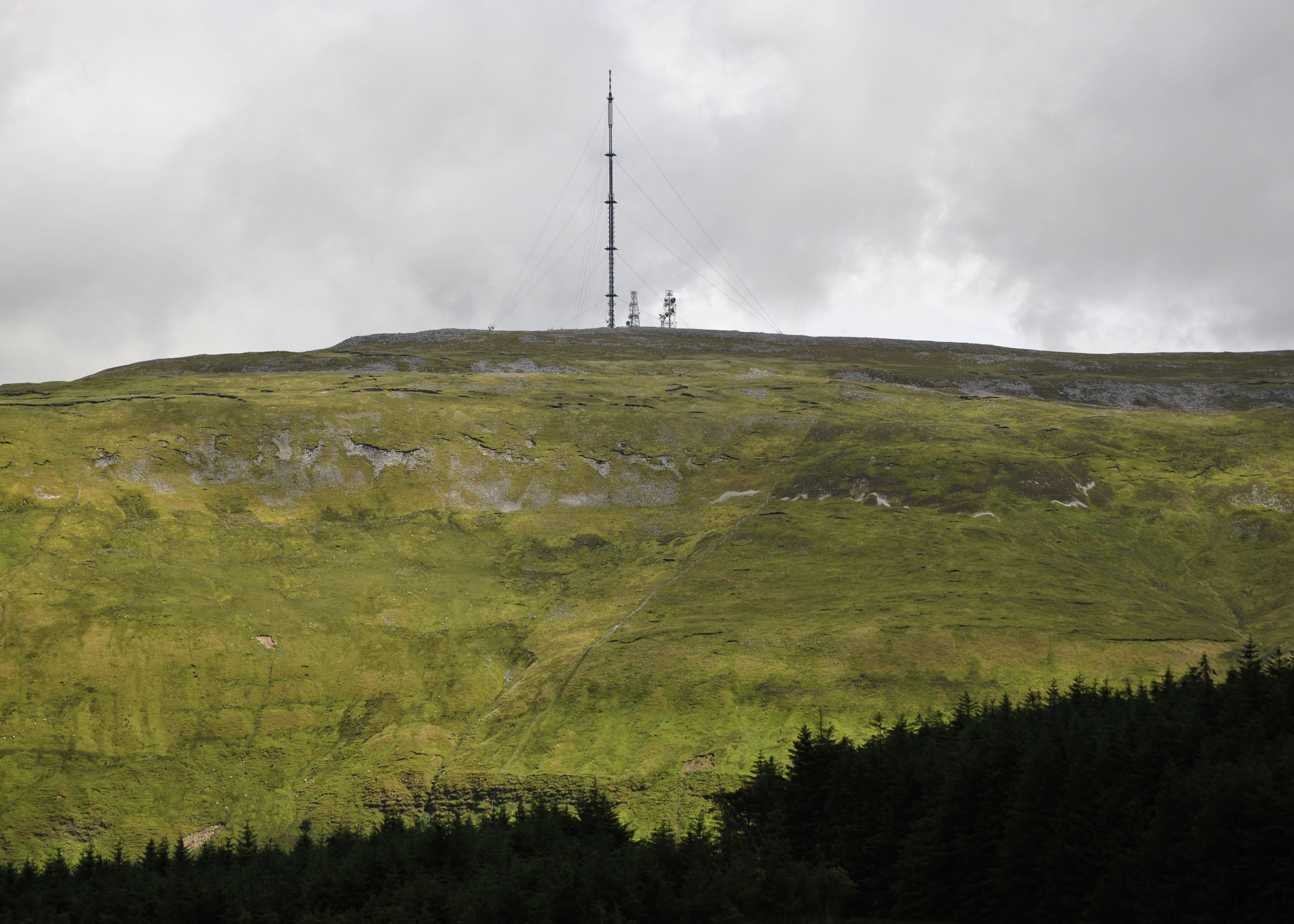
- Truskmore seen from Gleniff Horseshoe Drive

Highest point
- Elevation: 647 m (2,123 ft)
- Prominence: 560 m (1,840 ft)
- Listing: County Top (Sligo), Marilyn, Hewitt
- Coordinates: 54°22′27″N 8°22′18″W

Naming
- English translation: big cod (fish)
- Language of name: Irish

Geography
- Location within island of Ireland
- Location: border of County Sligo and County Leitrim, Republic of Ireland
- Parent range: Dartry Mountains
- OSI/OSNI grid: G758473

Truskmore (Irish: Trosc Mór, meaning 'big cod') is a mountain with a height of 647 metres (2,123 ft) on the border of County Sligo and County Leitrim in Ireland. It is the highest summit in the Dartry Mountains and the highest in Sligo. It is in the middle of a plateau whose edges are marked by high cliffs, including Benbulbin (526m), Benwiskin (514m), Slievemore (597m) and Kings Mountain (462m). The top of Truskmore lies in County Sligo, a short distance from the border with County Leitrim; however, the mountain itself is in both counties.

== Transmission site ==
The Truskmore television transmitter opened on 1 February 1962, the second of the original five main Telefis Éireann transmitters to go on air after Kippure (December 1961). It used as antenna carrier a 135 metres tall mast. Initially its transmissions were only in 405 lines on VHF channel 11, with 625-lines transmissions beginning in November 1963 on Channel I. The new RTÉ Radio VHF FM radio service was added in 1966. The second television service came in 1978 on Channel G and UHF television transmission began in 1996 with the advent of Teilifís na Gaeilge. In 2009 a new 175-m mast was erected in preparation for the changeover to digital television transmission and the original 1961 mast was removed. Since the national shutdown of the analog television networks on 24 October 2012, Truskmore now broadcasts the Irish DTT service Saorview and the national FM radio channels to the northwest of Ireland, including a large area of the west of Northern Ireland. The site is owned and operated by 2RN, a subsidiary of the Irish public service broadcaster RTÉ.

== Current transmissions ==
=== Digital television ===
Frequency	UHF	kW	Multiplex	Pol
642 MHz	42	160	Saorview 1	H
666 MHz	45	160	Saorview 2	H

=== FM radio ===
Frequency	kW	Service	Notes
88.2 MHz	125	RTÉ Radio 1	Since 1986
97.8 MHz	125	RTÉ lyric fm	Since 1999
90.4 MHz	125	RTÉ 2fm	89.7 MHz Before 1986
92.6 MHz	125	RTÉ Raidió na Gaeltachta	91.9 MHz Before 1986 (Mono only before 1982)
100.0 MHz	125	Today FM	Since 1997
102.5 MHz		Ocean FM	Since 2004
104.4 MHz		iRadio	Since 2011
107.4 MHz		Newstalk	Since 2006 Mono only

=== Truskmore relay transmitters ===
DTT Relay	County	Mux 1	Mux 2	kW	Pol
Aranmore	Donegal	47	44	4	V
Castlebar	Mayo	22	25	2	H
Dooncarton	Mayo	27	32	0.5	V&H
Glencolumcille	Donegal	33	36	0.2	H
Glenties	Donegal	32	34	0.1	H

== Gallery ==
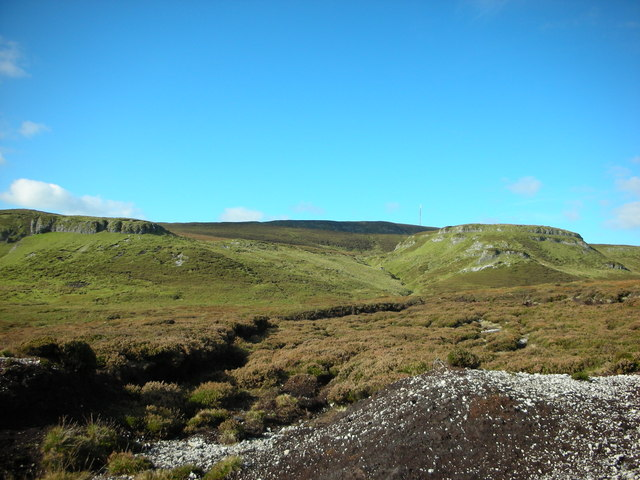
Truskmore (in the distance) from the south

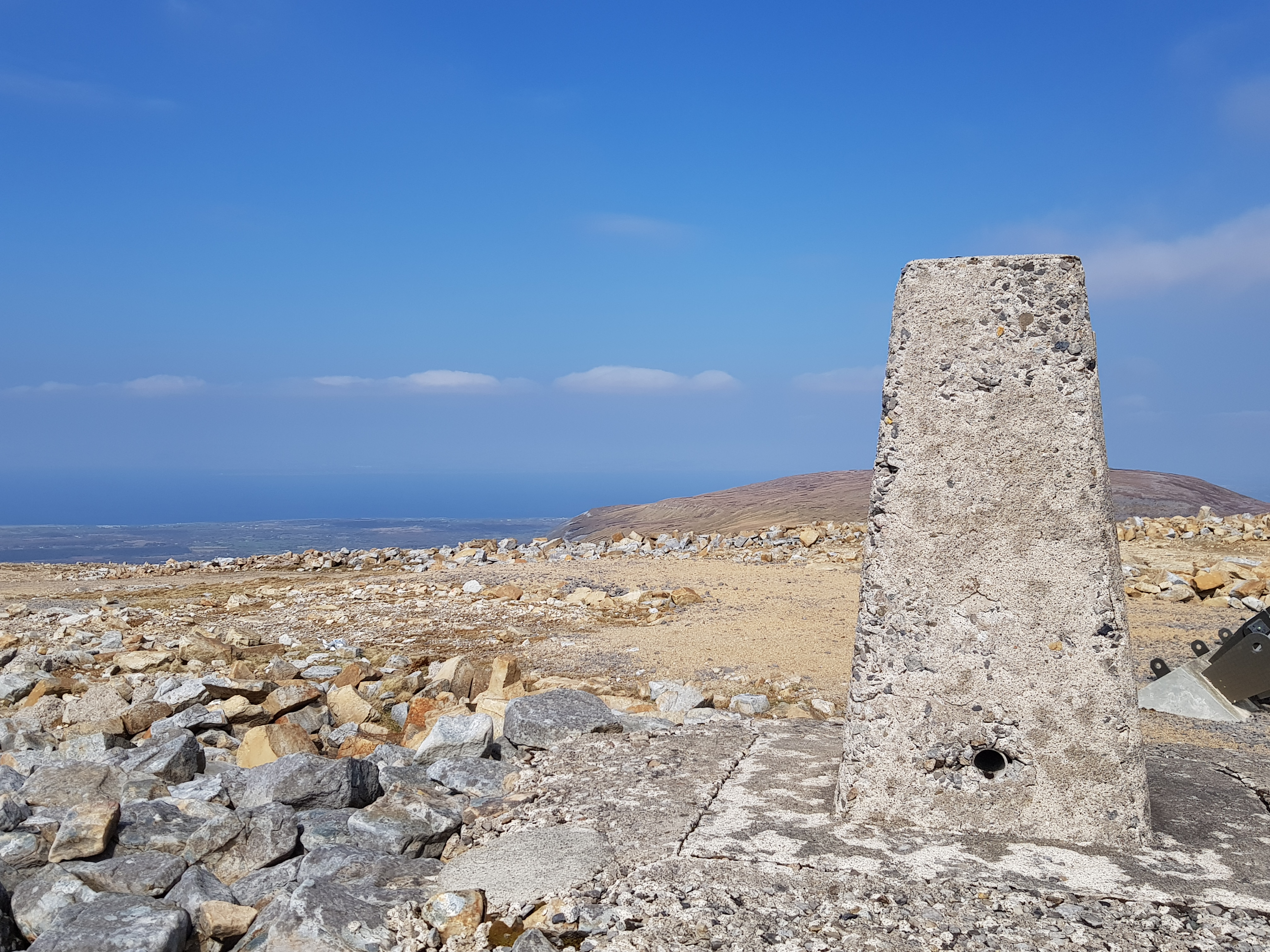
OSI Triangulation pillar marking the summit of Truskmore

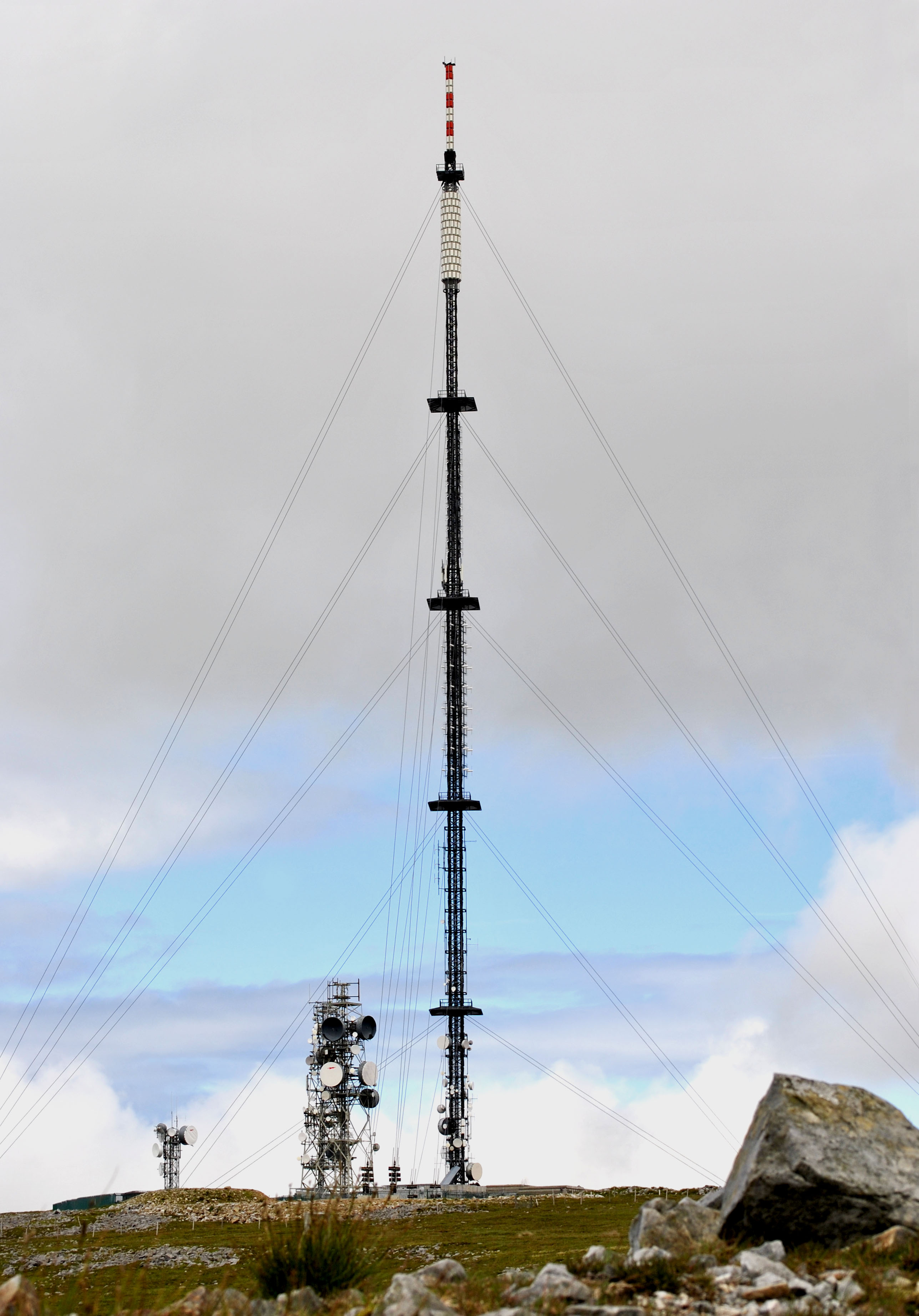
Transmission site on the summit

== See also ==
- Truskmore SE Cairn
- List of Irish counties by highest point
- List of tallest structures in Ireland
- Lists of mountains in Ireland
- Lists of mountains and hills in the British Isles
- List of Marilyns in the British Isles
- List of Hewitt mountains in England, Wales and Ireland
