= Dartry Mountains =

Mountain range in north-west Ireland

- Sléibhte Dhartraí
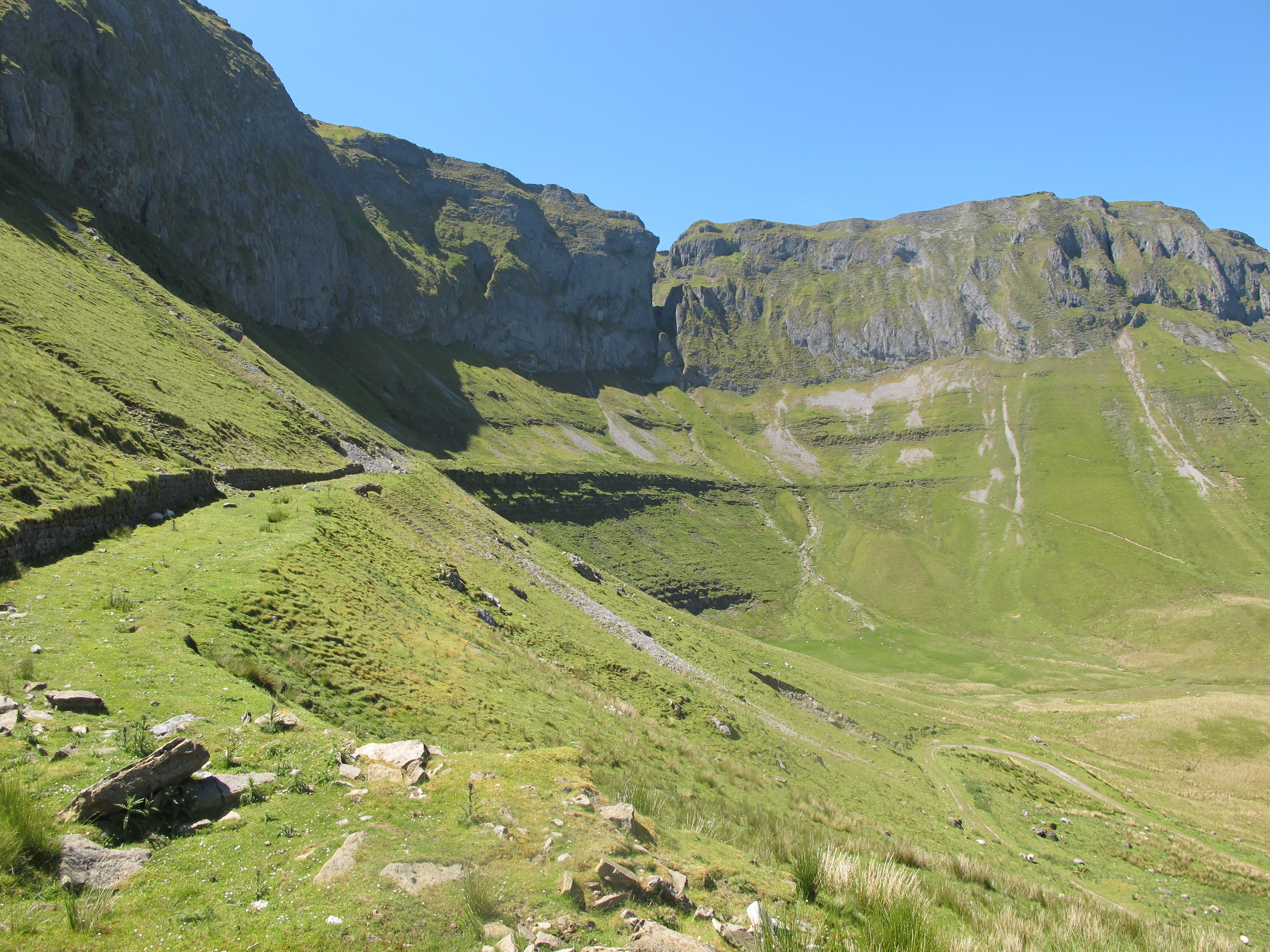

Highest point
- Peak: Truskmore
- Elevation: 647 m (2,123 ft)
- Coordinates: 54°20′N 8°25′W

Geography
- Country: Ireland
- Province: Connacht
- Counties: Sligo and Leitrim

Geology
- Rock age: Lower Carboniferous
- Rock types: Limestone and Sandstone

The Dartry Mountains (Irish: Sléibhte Dhartraí) are a mountain range in the north west of Ireland, in the north of counties Sligo and Leitrim. They lie between Lough Melvin, Lough Gill and Lough MacNean. The highest point is Truskmore at 647 metres (2,123 ft). Other notable mountains include Benbulbin at 526 metres (1,726 ft), Benwiskin at 514 metres (1,686 ft), and Tievebaun at 611 metres (2,005 ft).

The mountains are named after the old túath of Dartraighe, which was part of the kingdom of Bréifne. The mountains are very close to the Breifne Mountains, which lie to the southeast.

The range is a large dissected limestone plateau. Glaciation has carved the distinctive shapes of this mountain range. The range includes the valleys of Glencar, Glenade and Gleniff.

== Highest peaks ==
Rank	Mountain peak	Elevation
1	Truskmore	647 m (2,123 ft)
2	Truskmore SE Cairn	631 m (2,070 ft)
3	Tievebaun	611 m (2,005 ft)
4	Annacoona Top (Slievemore)	597 m (1,959 ft)
5	Benbulbin	526 m (1,726 ft)
6	Arroo	523 m (1,716 ft)
7	Benwiskin	514 m (1,686 ft)
8	Benwiskin South	508 m (1,667 ft)
9	Benbulbin South	505 m (1,657 ft)
10	Aganny	482 m (1,581 ft)

== Gallery ==
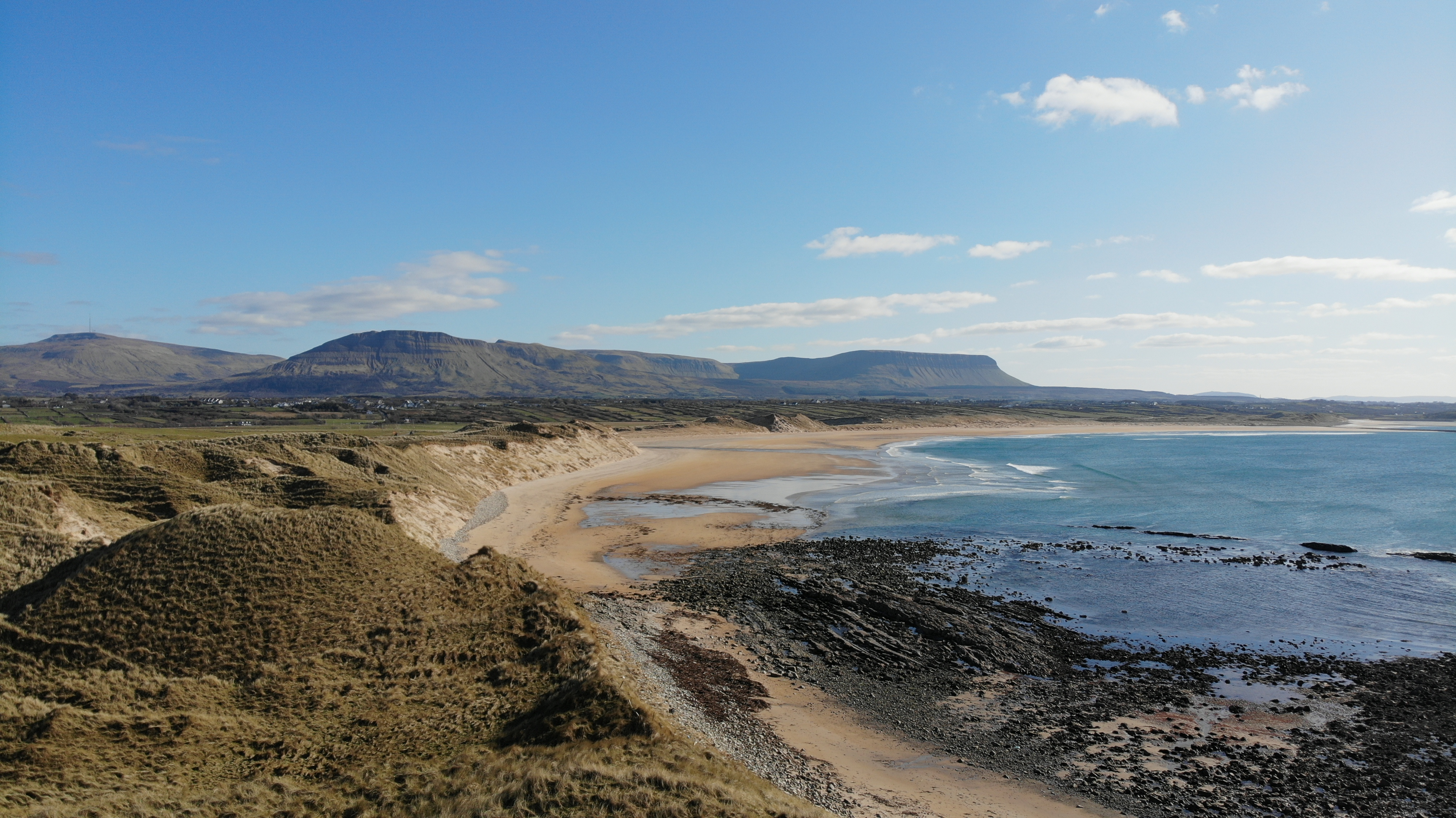
Dartry Mountains from Mullaghmore, peaks visible (from left): Truskmore, Benwiskin and Benbulbin

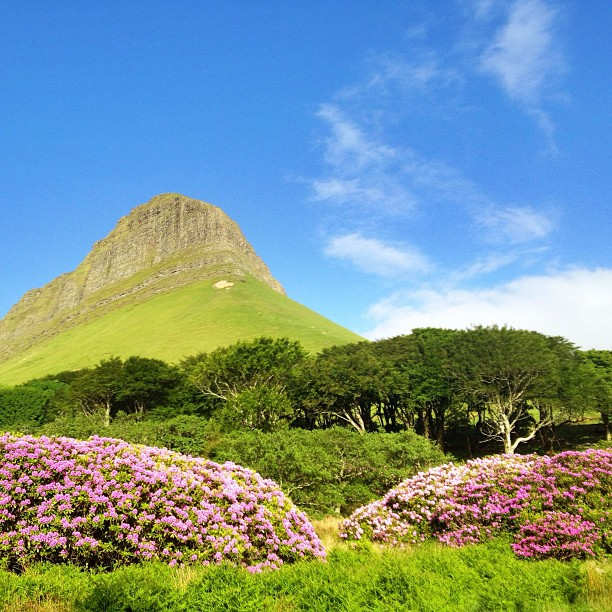
Benbulbin

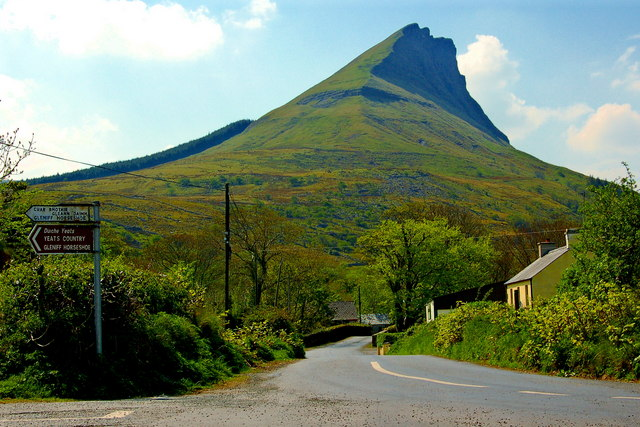
Benwiskin

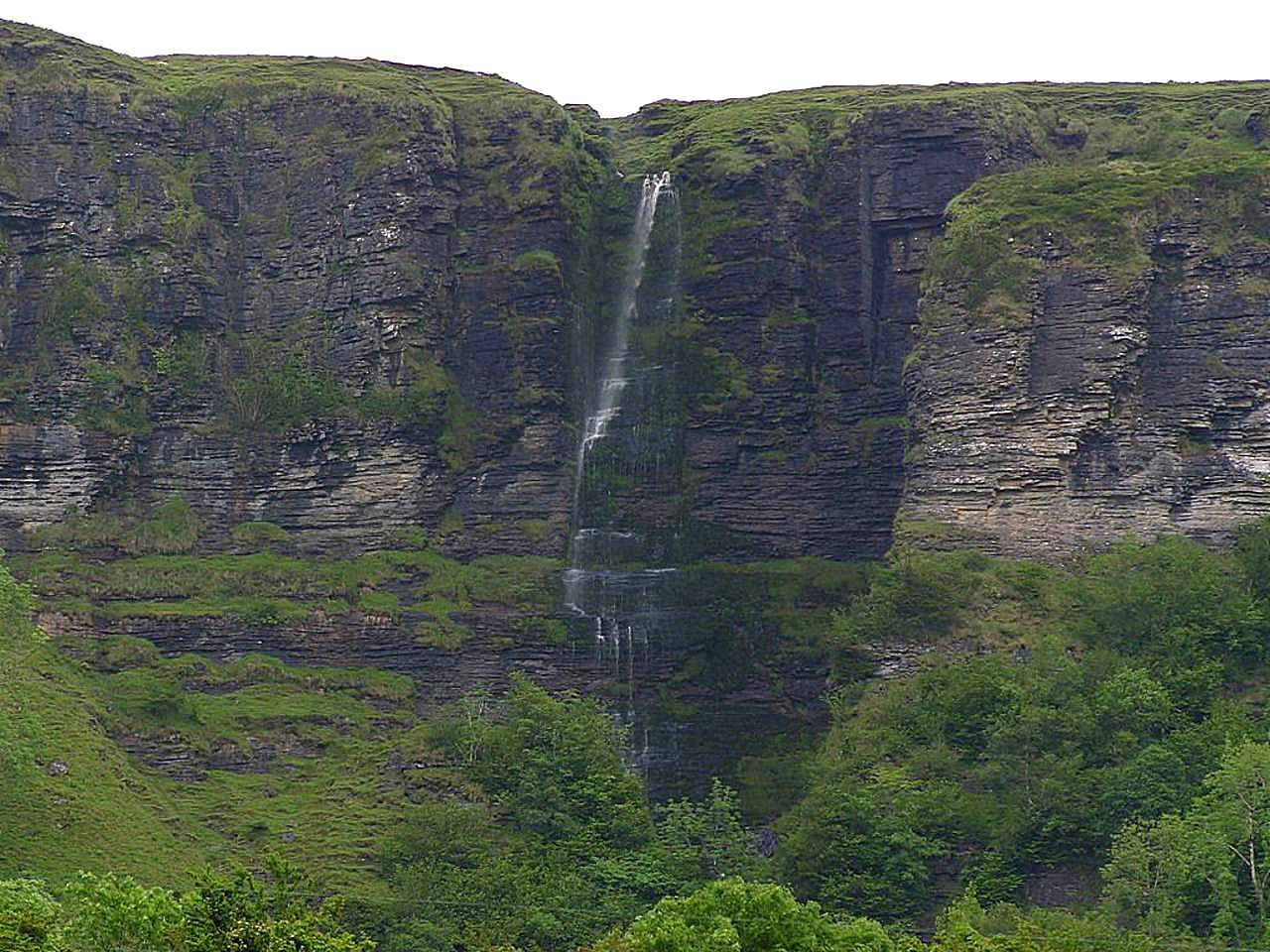
Sruth in Aghaidh an Aird, Ireland's tallest waterfall

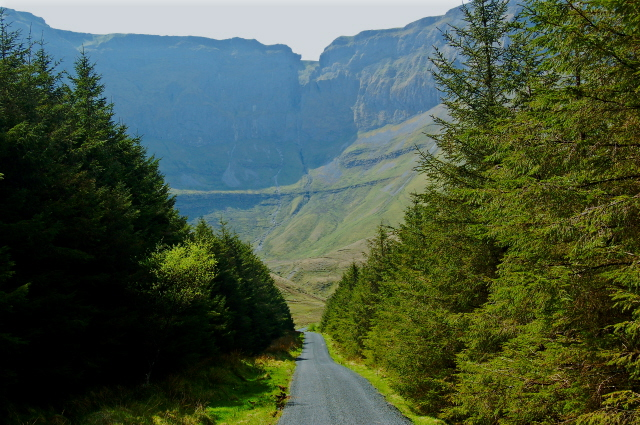
Gleniff Valley

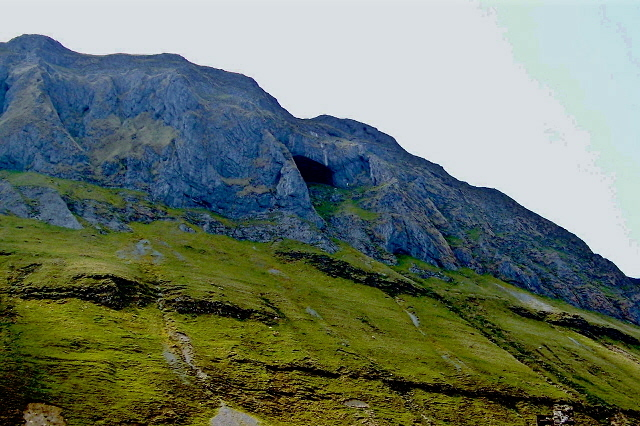
Diarmuid and Grainne's cave, the highest cave in Ireland
