= Benbulbin =

Mountain in County Sligo, Ireland

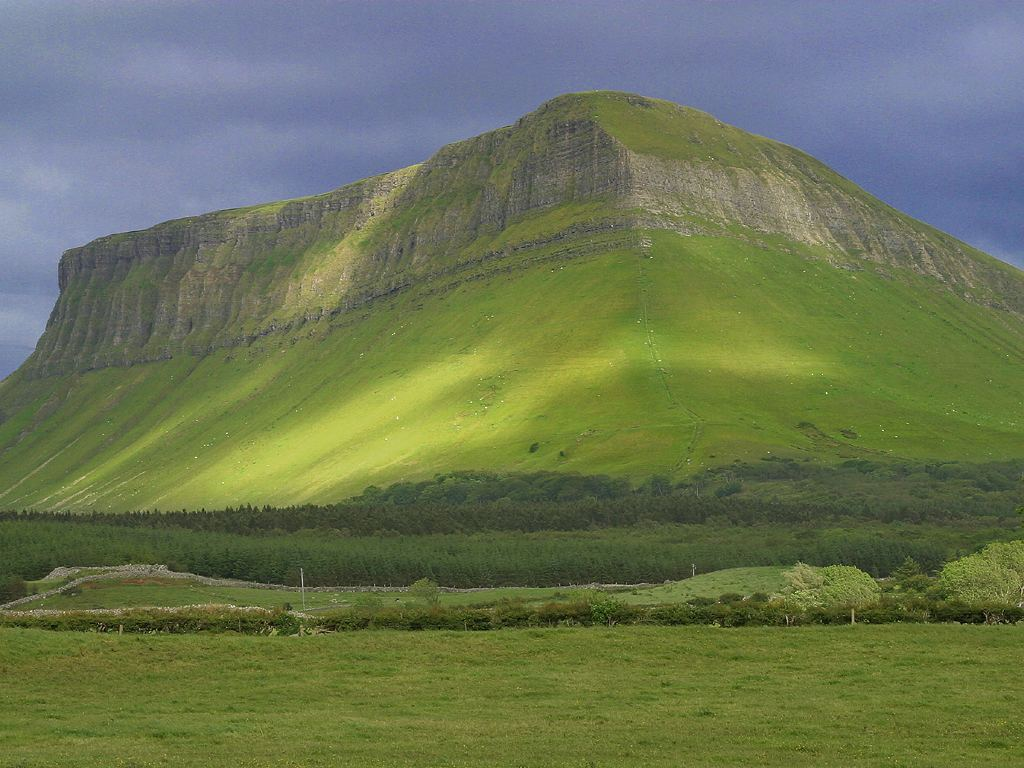
- Benbulbin's northern side on a cloudy day.

Highest point
- Elevation: 526 m (1,726 ft)
- Listing: Marilyn
- Coordinates: 54°22′N 8°28′W

Naming
- Native name: Binn Ghulbain (Irish)

Geography
- Location within Ireland
- Location: County Sligo, Ireland
- Parent range: Dartry Mountains
- OSI/OSNI grid: G692463
- Topo map: OSi Discovery 16

Climbing
- Easiest route: Hike

Benbulbin (Irish: Binn Ghulbain), sometimes Benbulben or Ben Bulben, is a steep-sided and flat-topped mountain in County Sligo, Ireland. It is part of the Dartry Mountains, in an area sometimes called "Yeats Country". Benbulbin, 526 m (1,726 ft) high, formed as a nunatak during the last Ice Age.

Benbulbin is a protected site, designated as a County Geological Site by Sligo County Council.

== Etymology ==
"Benbulbin", "Benbulben" and "Ben Bulben" are all anglicisations of the Irish name "Binn Ghulbain". "Binn" means "peak" or "mountain"; "ghulbain" may mean beak or jaw, or may refer to Conall Gulban, a son of Niall of the Nine Hostages, who was associated with the mountain.

== Geology ==
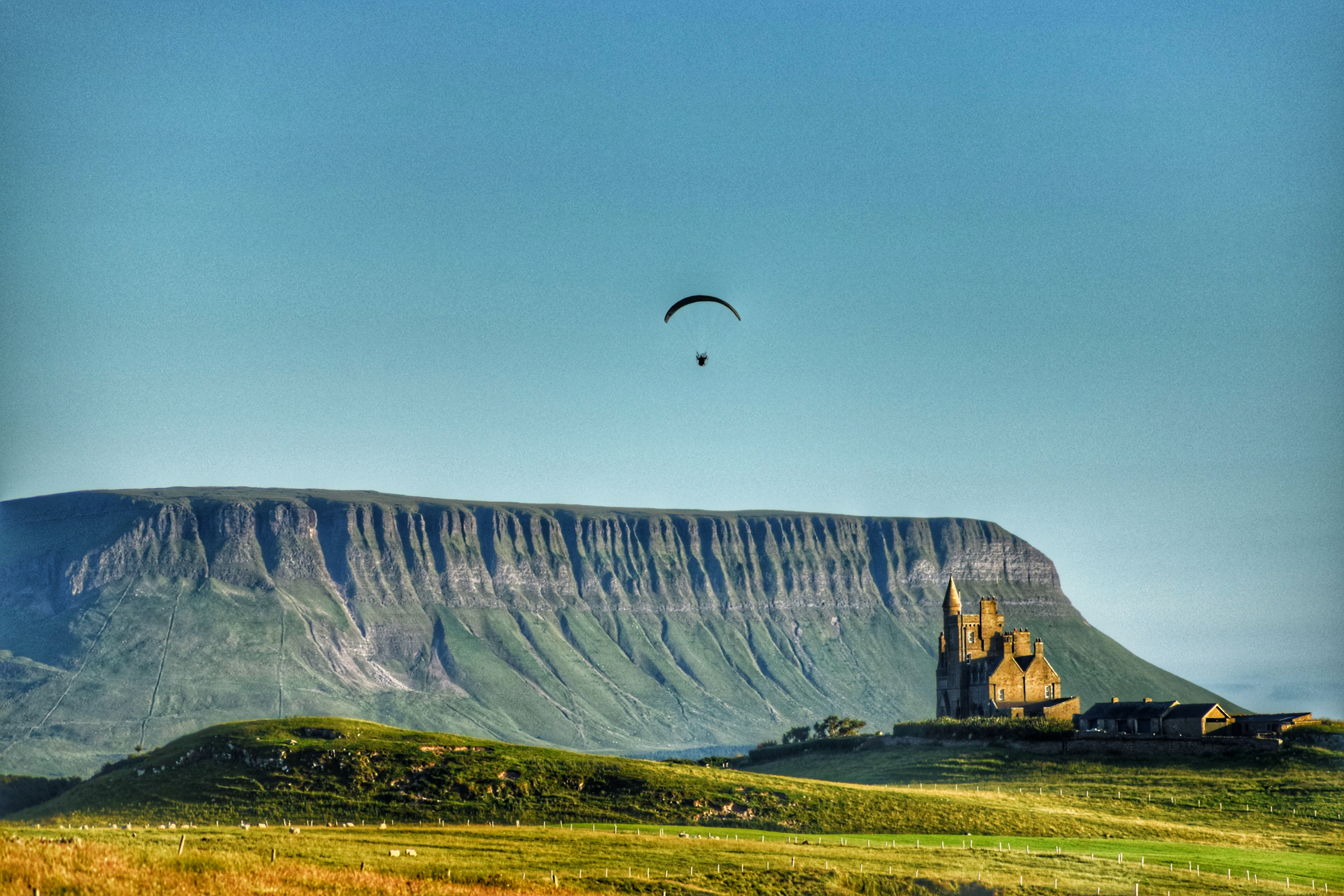
Benbulbin from Mullaghmore Head, with Classiebawn Castle in the foreground

=== Formation ===
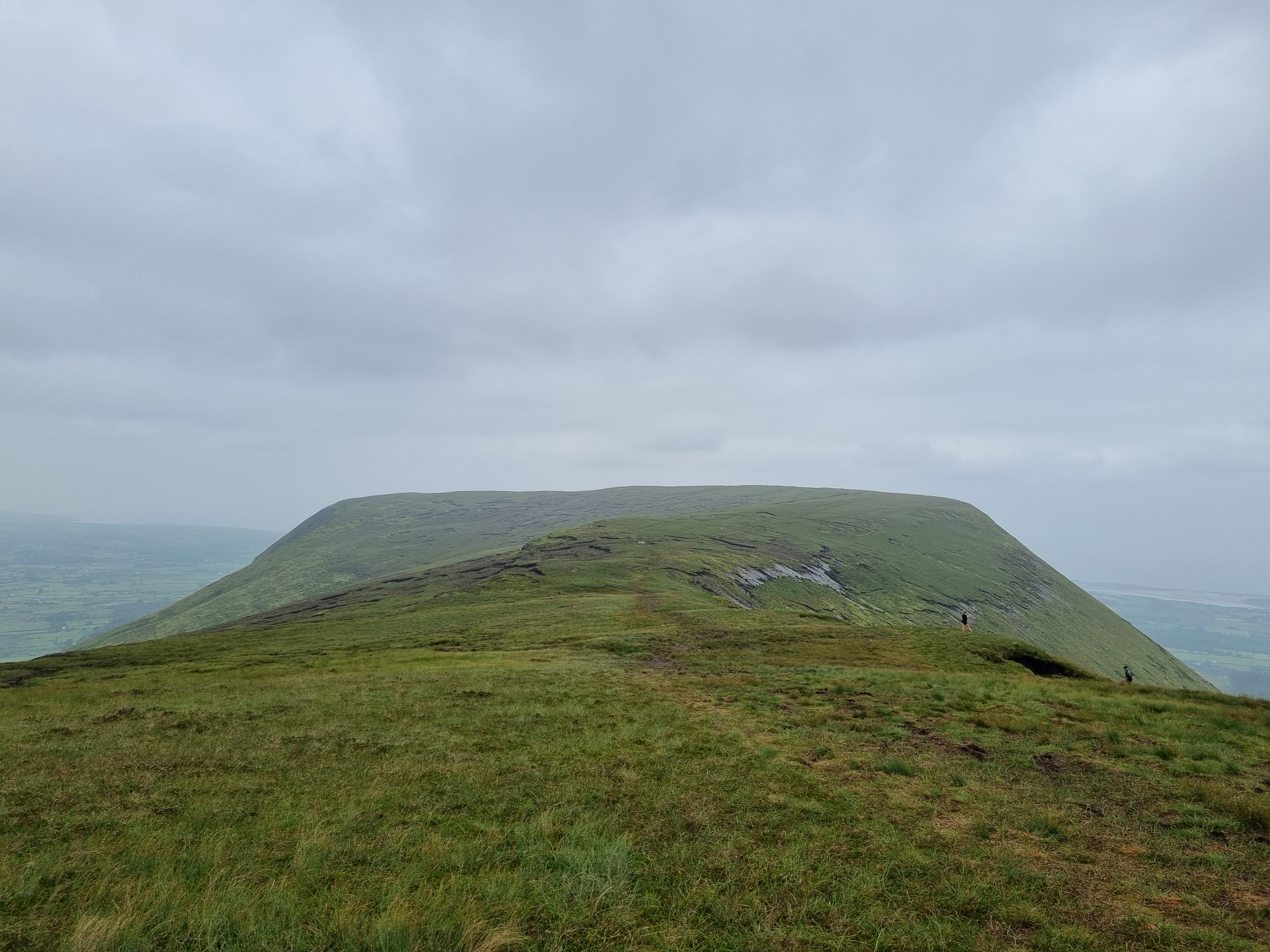
High plateau of Benbulbin

Benbulbin was shaped during the ice age, when Ireland was under glaciers. Originally it was a large plateau. Glaciers moving from the northeast to southwest shaped it into its present distinct formation.

=== Rock composition ===
Benbulbin, and the Dartry Mountains as a whole, are composed of limestones on top of mudstones. These rocks formed in the area approximately 345-330 million years ago in the Viséan Stage of the Carboniferous Period. The environment was a shallow sea. Uppermost in the limestone layer is a thicker, harder limestone called the Dartry Limestone Formation. Below this is a thinner transitional limestone formation – the Glencar Limestone Formation. Further down, the lower slopes consist of shaly mudstone known as the Benbulben Shale Formation. Scree deposits are found near the base.

Fossils exist throughout the layers of the mountains. All layers have many fossilised sea shells. The shale layer also holds some corals.

Baryte was mined at Glencarbury near Benbulbin in the Dartry range between 1894 and 1979.

== Climbing ==
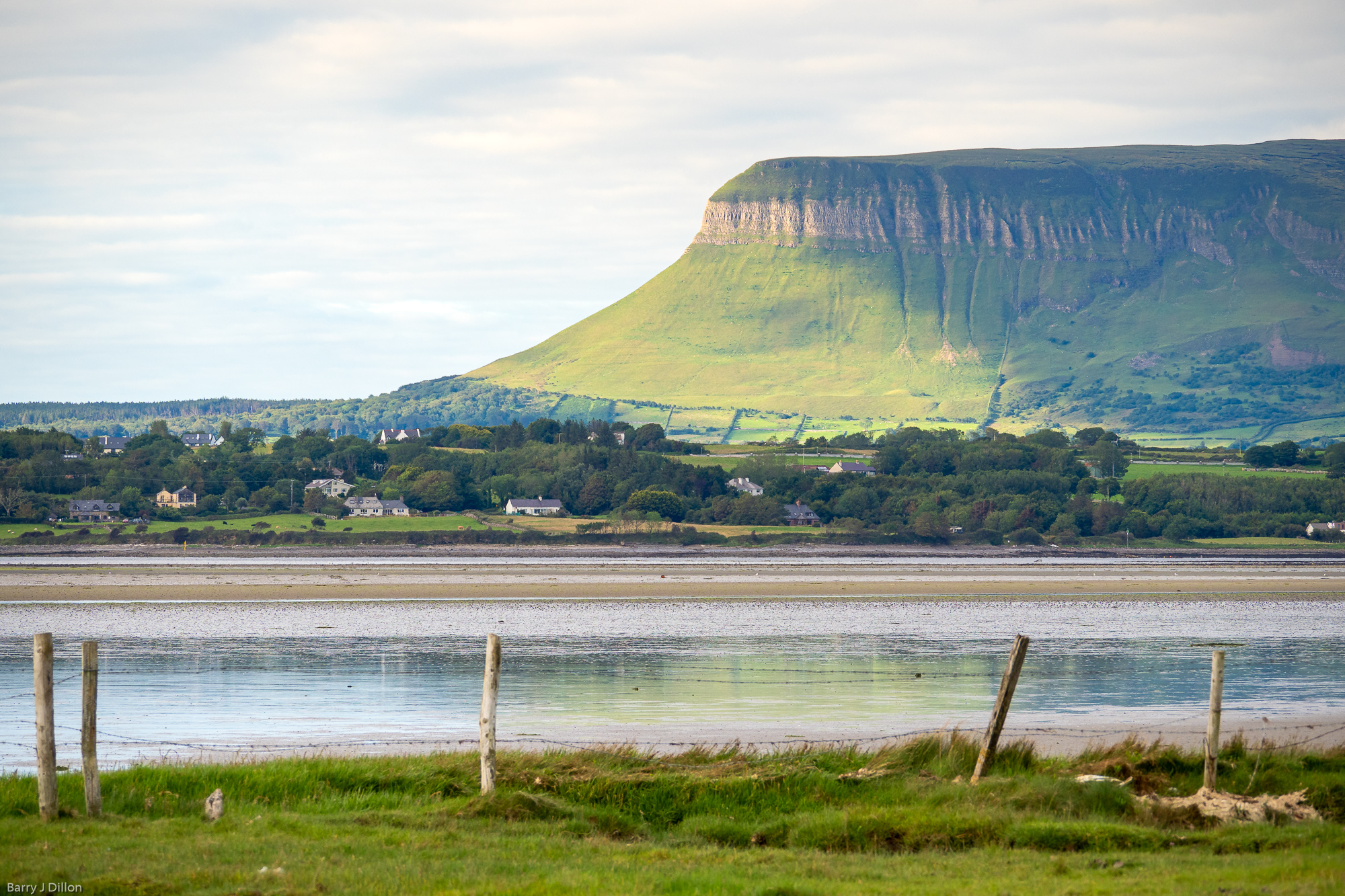
Benbulbin across Sligo Bay

Benbulbin is an established walking destination. If climbed by the north face, it is a hazardous climb. That side bears the brunt of the high winds and storms that come in from the Atlantic Ocean. However, if approached by the south side, it is an easy walk, since that side slopes very gently. From the summit there are views over the coastal plain of north County Sligo and the Atlantic ocean. The land adjacent to the western edge of the ridge is privately owned farmland and not accessible to the general public. However, there is a paved path up the south face to the east near Glencar Waterfall just over the County Leitrim border.

== Walking ==
One of the trails running alongside Benbulbin mountain is the Gortarowey Looped Walk, which runs both through the forest and out in the open, overlooking Benbulbin and Donegal Bay. It is 5.5 kilometres (3 mi) in length and takes approximately 1.5 hours to walk.

== Flora and fauna ==
Benbulbin hosts a variety of plants, including some found nowhere else in Ireland. Many are Arctic–alpine species, due to the mountain's height, which allows for cooler temperature at altitude than the surrounding terrain. These plants are believed to have evolved and established themselves just after the glaciers that formed Benbulbin had receded. In 2012, research revealed that the fringed sandwort found growing on Benbulbin (found nowhere else in the country) has, indeed, been present since the last ice age; the endemic plants are thought to be collectively around 100,000 years old. This discovery reopens the debate over whether or not Ireland's ecology, as we know it today, predates the Ice Age. Other notable flora found on Benbulbin includes Alpine saxifrage, Arabidopsis spp., arctic meadow-rue, bluebells, Meconopsis spp., Poa alpina, Polystichum lonchitis, and snowbed willow.

Wild badger, hare and red fox may be seen in the area. The formation also hosts a population of red-billed chough—birds with a similar appearance to crows, ravens and other Corvids, albeit with bright red bills.

== In Irish history ==
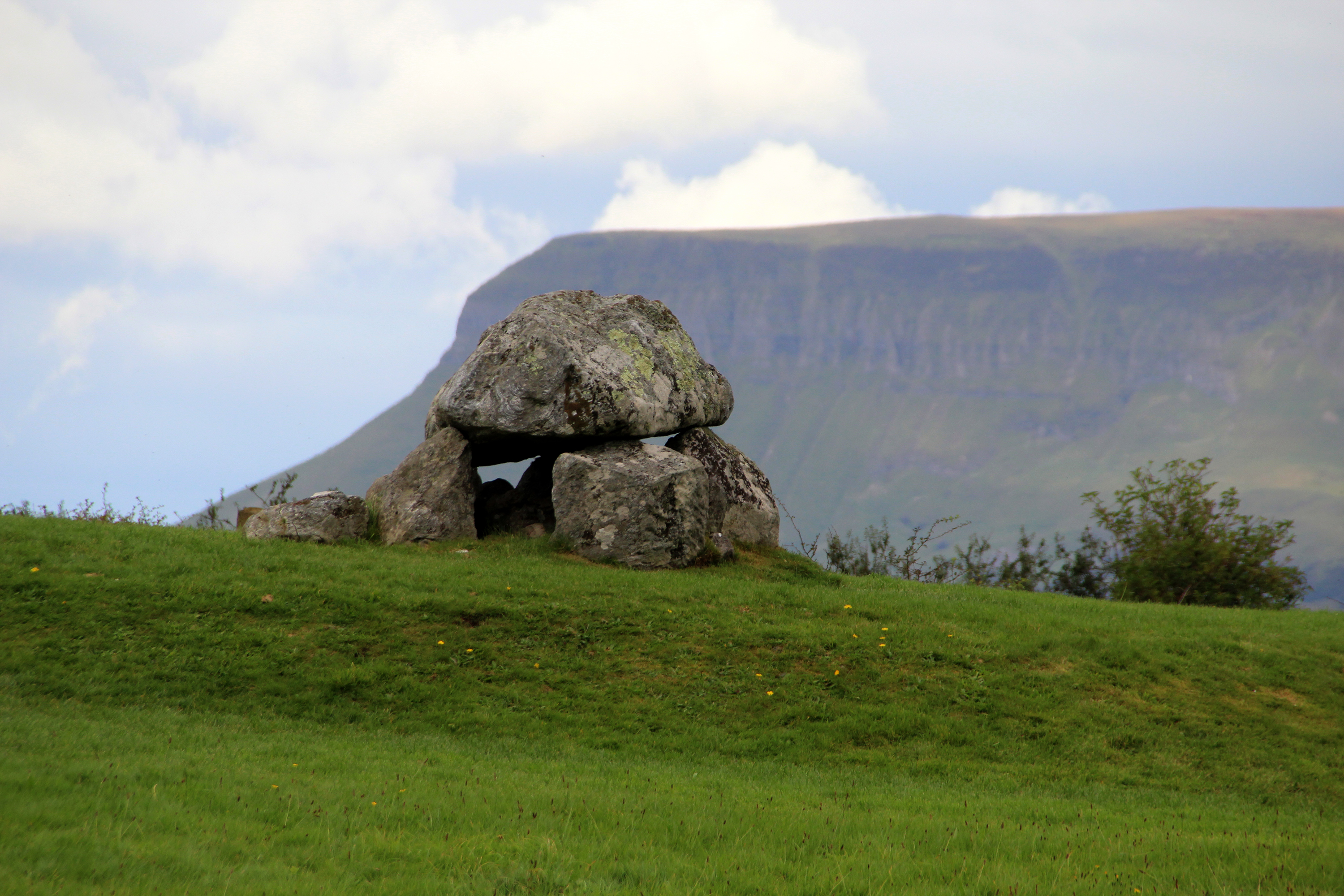
One of the Carrowmore tombs and Benbulbin

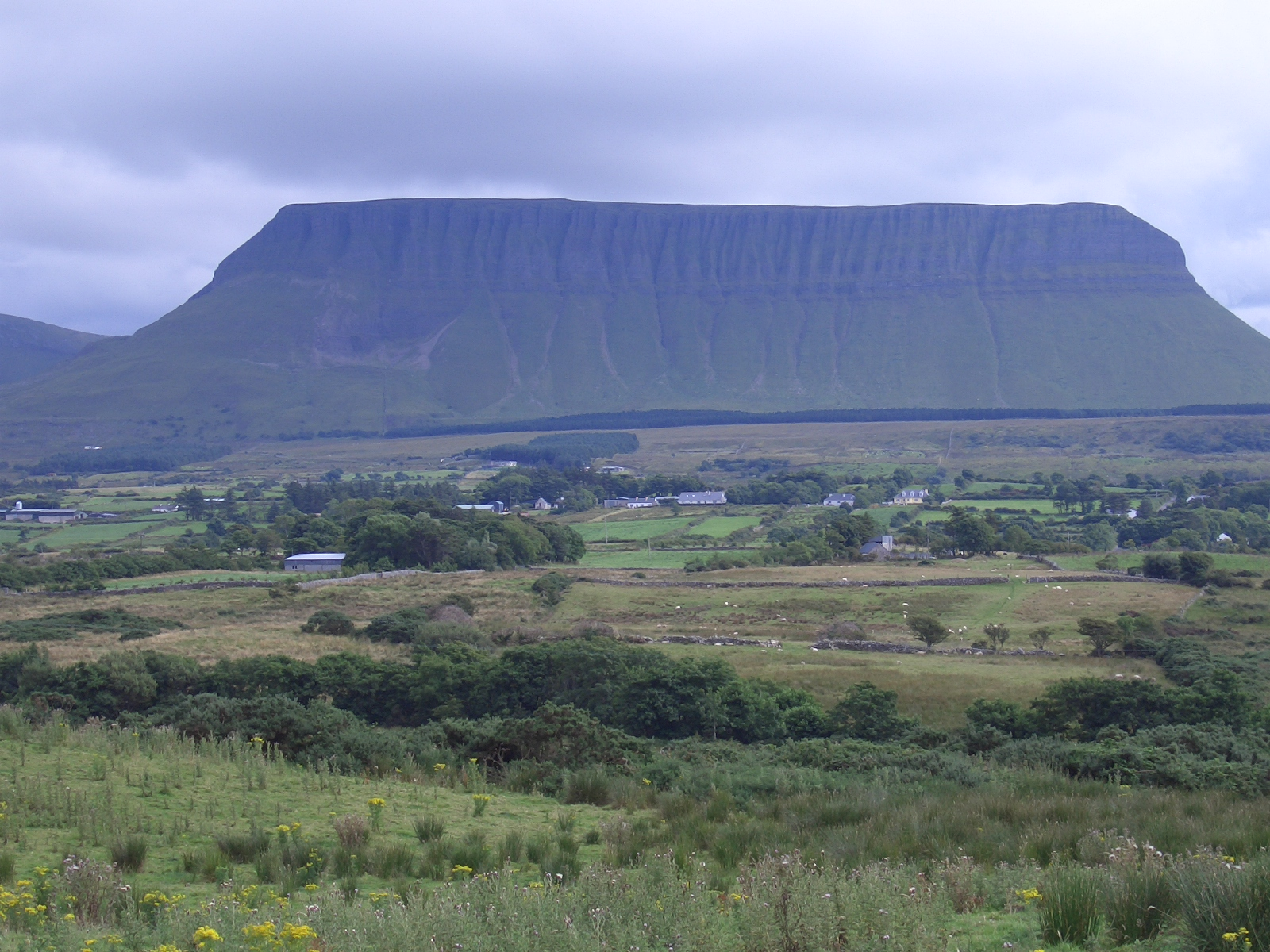
Northern side

=== Irish legends ===
Benbulbin is the setting of several Irish legends. It is said to be one of the hunting grounds of the Fianna, a band of warriors who are said to have lived in the 3rd century. One example is the story of The Pursuit of Diarmuid and Gráinne, in which the warrior Diarmuid Ua Duibhne (Diarmuid) is tricked by Fionn mac Cumhaill (Finn McCool) into fighting an enchanted boar, which later kills the warrior by piercing his heart with its tusk. McCool is also said to have found his long-lost son Oisín at this location. The mountain is said to be Diarmuid and Gráinne's resting place. Also, in the 6th century, St. Columba fought a battle on the plain below Benbulbin at Cúl Dreimhne (Cooladrumman) for the right to copy a Psalter he had borrowed from St. Finnian.

=== Irish Civil War ===
On 20 September 1922, during the Irish Civil War, an Irish Republican Army column, including an armoured car were cornered in Sligo. The car was destroyed by another armoured car belonging to the Irish Free State's National Army, and six of the IRA soldiers fled up the Benbulbin's slopes. In the end, all were killed, allegedly after they had surrendered. They are known as the "Noble Six". Brigadier Seamus Devins TD, Div. Adj. Brian MacNeill, Capt. Harry Benson, Lieut. Paddy Carroll, Vols. Tommy Langan and Joe Banks were those killed on the mountain. The six anti-treaty fighters were hunted down on the slopes of Benbulbin and put to death by Free State forces which were out to avenge the killing of Brigadier Joseph Ring eight days earlier. Two of those killed and Ring were ancestors of current and recent politicians: Ring is the grand uncle of Michael Ring, McNeill is the uncle of former Tánaiste and Minister for Justice, Equality and Law Reform Michael McDowell and Devins is the grandfather of Jimmy Devins. Mary O'Rourke once narrated a radio documentary telling how her grandmother's home was used as a safehouse.

=== Plane crashes ===
During World War II there were two plane crashes in the Dartry mountains close to Benbulbin.

On 9 December 1943, a USAAF Boeing B-17G Flying Fortress plane (en route from Goose Bay, Labrador to Prestwick, Scotland) crashed on Truskmore just east of Benbulbin. 10 airmen were aboard, of whom three died, two at the scene and one from injuries sustained in the crash. Local residents undertook a rescue mission, taking the injured off the mountain where they were then transferred to Sligo County Hospital. Substantial wreckage of the plane stayed on the mountain for many years following the crash and today limited amounts of aircraft fragments still remain at the site.

Near the location of the Flying Fortress crash, there was an earlier crash also involving a military aircraft. On 21 March 1941, an RAF Catalina flying boat (AM265) using the Donegal Corridor crashed into the mountain at Glenade, County Leitrim on the east side of Truskmore. All nine airmen aboard died in the crash.

=== Recent history ===
In the 1970s and 1980s, Sinn Féin had engaged in a slogan campaign around the theme 'Brits out of Ireland'. Roads and walls throughout Ireland had been marked with these slogans as was Benbulbin in 1977. It was marked first with 'Brits Out' (180 ft wide and 25 ft high) and then later with the slogan 'H-Block'.

Benbulbin overlooks the village of Mullaghmore, the site of the assassination of Lord Mountbatten in 1979.

As stated above, Benbulbin is a protected site, designated as a County Geological Site by Sligo County Council. However, in May 2018, 'Vote No' (8th amendment) campaigners erected a large "NO" sign, severely impacting the iconic view. Sligo County Council responded on social media with the following statement, "As the land where the lettering was placed is commonage, Sligo County Council has no role in this matter". The sign was removed the next day.

== Notable people ==
The athlete Mary Cullen is from nearby Drumcliffe. Andy "The Bull" McSharry, involved in a famous 17-year-long dispute over allowing access rights over his land, lives near Benbulbin.

== In literature ==
Benbulbin features prominently in the poetry of W. B. Yeats, after whom Yeats Country is named. County Sligo is considered integral to the poet's work. The mountain is one of the destinations on the Passport Trail of the poet's life.

Yeats wrote the following in The Celtic Twilight:

But for Ben Bulben and Knocknarea,
Many a poor sailor'd be cast away.

The mountain is also mentioned in Yeats's On a Political Prisoner, in which he recalls the Countess Markiewicz riding past it to political meetings.

Yeats's famous poem, Under Ben Bulben, is essentially a description of Yeats Country. It describes the sights that he saw in Yeats Country. The following is an excerpt from Under Ben Bulben:

Under bare Ben Bulben's head
In Drumcliff churchyard Yeats is laid.
An ancestor was rector there
Long years ago, a church stands near,
By the road an ancient cross.
No marble, no conventional phrase;
On limestone quarried near the spot
By his command these words are cut:

Cast a cold eye
On life, on death.

Horseman, pass by!

— Under Ben Bulben, W.B. Yeats

This was Yeats's final poem, published in The Irish Times. He is buried in Drumcliffe Churchyard, in the shadow of Benbulbin.

== Gallery ==
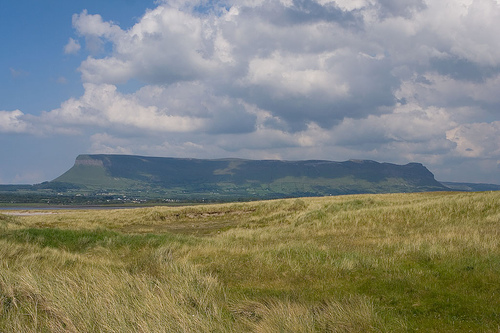
From the south.

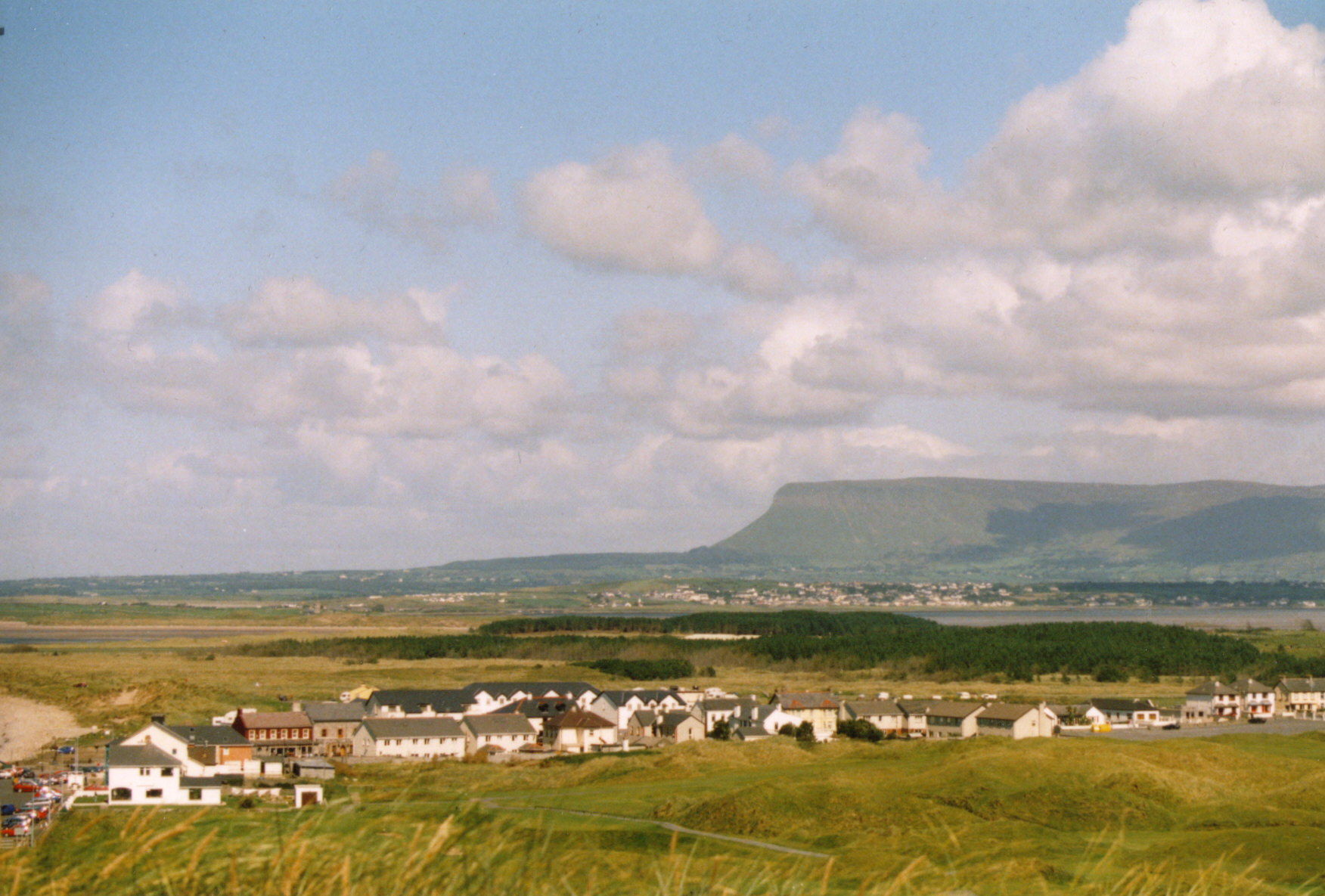
Eastern view

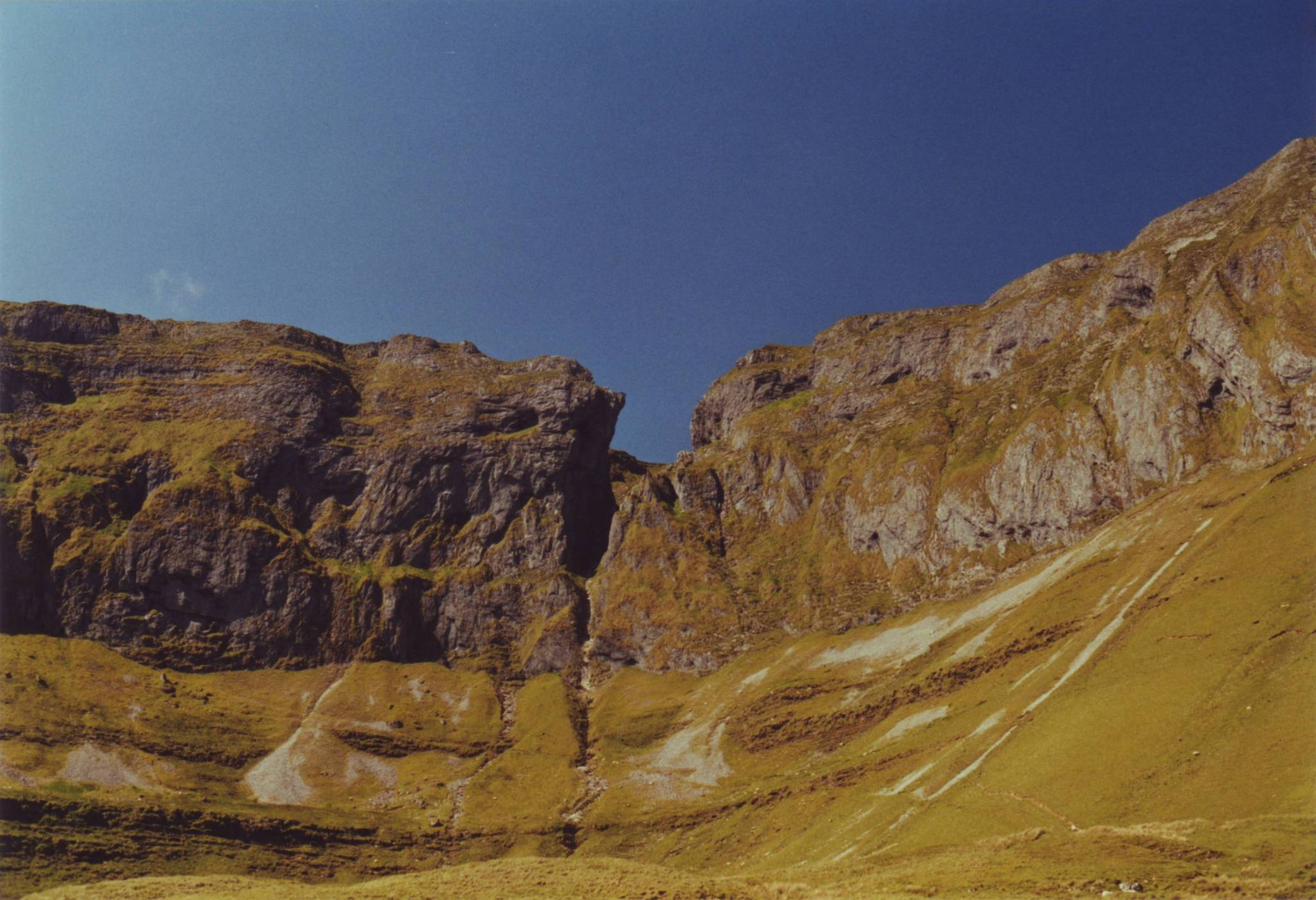
Back of Benbulbin, as seen from Gleniff Horseshoe

== See also ==
- List of mountains in Ireland
- List of Special Areas of Conservation in the Republic of Ireland
- Wiktionary definition of a ben
