= List of forests in Ireland =

The area of national forest estate in Ireland has increased to approximately 700,000 hectares as a result of a significant increase in private forest development in the mid-1980s, with the introduction of grant schemes funded by the EU aimed at encouraging private land owners, mainly farmers, to become involved in forestry. Of this, approximately 45% is in private ownership and 55% is in the ownership of Coillte.

During the first 75 years of the 20th century, forestry in Ireland was almost exclusively carried out by the state. By 1985, forest and woodland cover was approximately 420,000 hectares.

Upon the first arrival of humans in Ireland around 12,500 years ago, the entire island was predominantly covered in a blanket of thick woodland. These woodlands consisted largely of oak and pine forests. However, centuries of heavy deforestation meant that by the end of the 19th century, the area of woodland and forest cover in Ireland was estimated to be approximately 69,000 hectares, or 1% of the national land area.

The vast majority of forestry plantings in Ireland are non-native species, chiefly Sitka spruce, with the consequent damage to biodiversity and the environment.

== By province and county ==
=== Ulster ===
County Antrim

- Carnfunnock Country Park
- Glenariff Forest Park
- Lagan Valley
- Slieveanorra Forest

County Armagh

- Gosford Forest Park
- Maghery Country Park

County Cavan

- Dún na Rí Forest Park
- Killykeen Forest Park

County Donegal

- Ards Forest Park

County Down

- Castlewellan Forest Park
- Lagan Valley
- Rostrevor Forest
- Tollymore Forest Park

County Fermanagh

- Crom Estate
- Florence Court Forest Park

County Londonderry

- Roe Valley Country Park

County Monaghan

- Dartrey Forest
- Dún na Rí Forest Park

County Tyrone

- Drum Manor Forest Park

=== Munster ===
County Cork

Glenbower Wood, Killeagh.

- The Gearagh
- Glengarriff Forest

County Kerry

- Killarney National Forest

=== Leinster ===
County Carlow

- Oak Park Forest Park

County Dublin

- Barnaslingan Wood
- Carrickgollogan Forest Trail
- Tibradden Wood

County Meath

- Mullaghmeen Forest

County Wicklow

- Avondale Forest
- Crone Woods
- Djouce Woods

=== Connacht ===
County Galway

- Barna Woods
- Coole Park and Garryland Nature Reserve

County Leitrim

- Glenfarne Demesne

County Sligo

- Gortarowey Forest Recreation Area
- Hazelwood

== See also ==
- Forest inventory
- Geography of Ireland
- Native trees of Ireland
