= Florencecourt =

Coordinates: 54.2625°N 7.7173°W

Florencecourt: Irish: Mullach na Seangán
- Location within Northern Ireland
- Population: 102 (with Drumlaghy)
- Irish grid reference: H2034
- District: Fermanagh and Omagh
- County: County Fermanagh
- Country: Northern Ireland
- Sovereign state: United Kingdom
- Postcode district: BT
- Dialling code: 028
- UK Parliament: Fermanagh and South Tyrone
- NI Assembly: Fermanagh and South Tyrone

Florencecourt is a small village in County Fermanagh, Northern Ireland. In the 2021 census it had a population (with Drumlaghy) of 102 people. It is situated within Fermanagh and Omagh district. Historically the area was called "Mullanashangan" (from Irish Mullach na Seangán 'summit of the ants').

== Background ==
The village contains 39 houses and an Orange Hall. Florencecourt Primary School is located at Drumlaghy, where there is also a doctors' surgery and dispensary. Florencecourt post office and local shop closed on 4 November 2006. The Tully Mill Complex is a group of new buildings built around a restored corn mill; this complex consists of the Larganess Centre, Tully Mill Bar and Restaurant and the Benaughlin Holiday Cottages.

The Gortatole Outdoor Education Centre in Florencecourt is situated on the shore of Lower Lough MacNean beneath the imposing cliffs of the Hanging Rock. It has had a series of refurbishments in the last year including a new climbing wall and archery range.

== Places of interest ==
Nearby are two of Fermanagh's major tourist attractions, Marble Arch Caves and the National Trust property Florence Court House. Florence Court Forest Park is situated on the north east shoulder of Cuilcagh mountain. The forest covers an area of 12 square kilometres. Killykeeghen Nature Reserve, Cladagh Glen Nature Reserve and the Hanging Rock Nature Reserve are all in the surrounding area.

The Florence Court Yew is located in the old garden at Florence Court House. It is the surviving specimen of the two original Irish Yew seedlings and the mother of most Irish Yew trees worldwide. The seedlings were discovered on the slopes of Cuilcagh mountain near Florencecourt by George Willis in 1764. Willis presented one seedling to his landlord, Lord Mount Florence, and transplanted the other to his own garden where it died around 1860. The yew has been severely damaged over the years by the number of cuttings taken from it for propagation (Irish Yews can only be propagated from cuttings) and the shade of surrounding trees. Efforts are being made to improve its condition by gradually removing these surrounding trees to improve its access to light.

== Churches ==
=== St John, Killesher (Church of Ireland) ===
The church was built c.1791 with money raised by local subscription and parochial assessment, on land endowed to the parish by 1st Earl of Enniskillen. It is cruciform, standing on a north–south axis, and was originally a "simple, almost barn-like hall" around 30 feet wide and 64 feet long, with four bays of double-Y tracery windows. The four story tower, spire, transepts and chancel were added in 1819 following a loan of £553 16s 1d from the Board of First Fruits. Rowan stated that: "The tower and spire with crenelations and diagonal buttresses is one of the most attractive in the county".

Further alterations were made later in the 19th century on behalf of 3rd Earl of Enniskillen, including new windows in the chancel and east transept with "more orthodox sandstone Decorated tracery". Rowan conjectured that an "adventurous timber-traceried" window in the west transept may have been the altar window of the original design. The nave had a "delicate trefoil cornice in wood, reminiscent of the plaster cornice in Florence Court staircase".

The church was burnt to the ground in 1979 with only the tower and external walls surviving; nothing remains of the original interior. Before the fire, Rowan described St John's as "an attractive and unusually complete late Georgian gothic church". The restoration by W. Dent was executed in a plainer gothic style and the church was reconsecrated in 1982.

The current furnishings include a fine High Victorian marble pulpit, reading desk and font from a defunct Church of Ireland church in Dublin, as well as an ornate Victorian communion rail and lectern, both in brass. Stained glass by Caldermac Studios (Lisburn) was installed in 1982. The altar window represents the Four Evangelists, whilst the other windows include depictions of the Ascension, Christ as good shepherd, the Nativity, and the parable of the sower.

=== St Patrick, Killesher (Roman Catholic), Crossroads ===
"A four bay lancet hall built in 1857 with an asymmetrical north tower (altered in its top stage to become a modern belfry). Exposed kingpost roof inside."

=== Wheathill, Killesher (Roman Catholic) ===
A four bay lancet hall built in 1874 by Rev J, Cleary.

=== Florencecourt Methodist Church, Drumduff ===
New church recently built. The previous church on the site was built in 1887; its opening ceremony was performed by prominent Enniskillen Methodist William Carson. The old church was a small four bay rendered hall, with porch and small round-headed windows. Both gables had tripartite round-headed windows with a glazed roundel above.

== Defunct Churches ==
=== Wheathill Methodist Church ===
"A small stone-built hall of three bays with paired round-headed windows." Built in 1882, before then the congregation met in the Church of Ireland school at Cladagh. The church was sold in 1979 and is now a private dwelling.

=== Drumlaghy Chapel ===
The remains of an 18th-century Wesleyan chapel, located close to Florencecourt Primary School. The chapel was a small limestone three-bay gabled hall with wooden double Y tracery windows. Now an unglazed outhouse, the gables have been reduced and it has a flat roof. The chapel was closed in 1887 as it was letting in rain and no longer suitable. The congregation moved to the new Florencecourt Methodist Church at Drumduff.

== Transport ==
=== Road ===
- Ulsterbus service 192 from Swanlinbar to Enniskillen stops at Creamery Cross, Drumlaghy. The service runs Monday to Saturday with a morning bus to Enniskillen and an evening bus out of Enniskillen. An additional bus also runs into Enniskillen every Thursday.
- Fermangh Community Transport (formerly Rural Lift) offers a minibus service to local residents.

=== Rail ===
Florencecourt railway station was located approximately two miles from Florencecourt village. It opened on 18 March 1879 and closed on 1 October 1957. The station was served by the Sligo, Leitrim and Northern Counties Railway which operated between Sligo and Enniskillen. The station building is now a private dwelling. It retains its canopy, platform and adjacent goods shed, although its signal box was demolished.

== See also ==
- List of villages in Northern Ireland
