= Drumlaghy =

Coordinates: 54.267°N 7.709°W

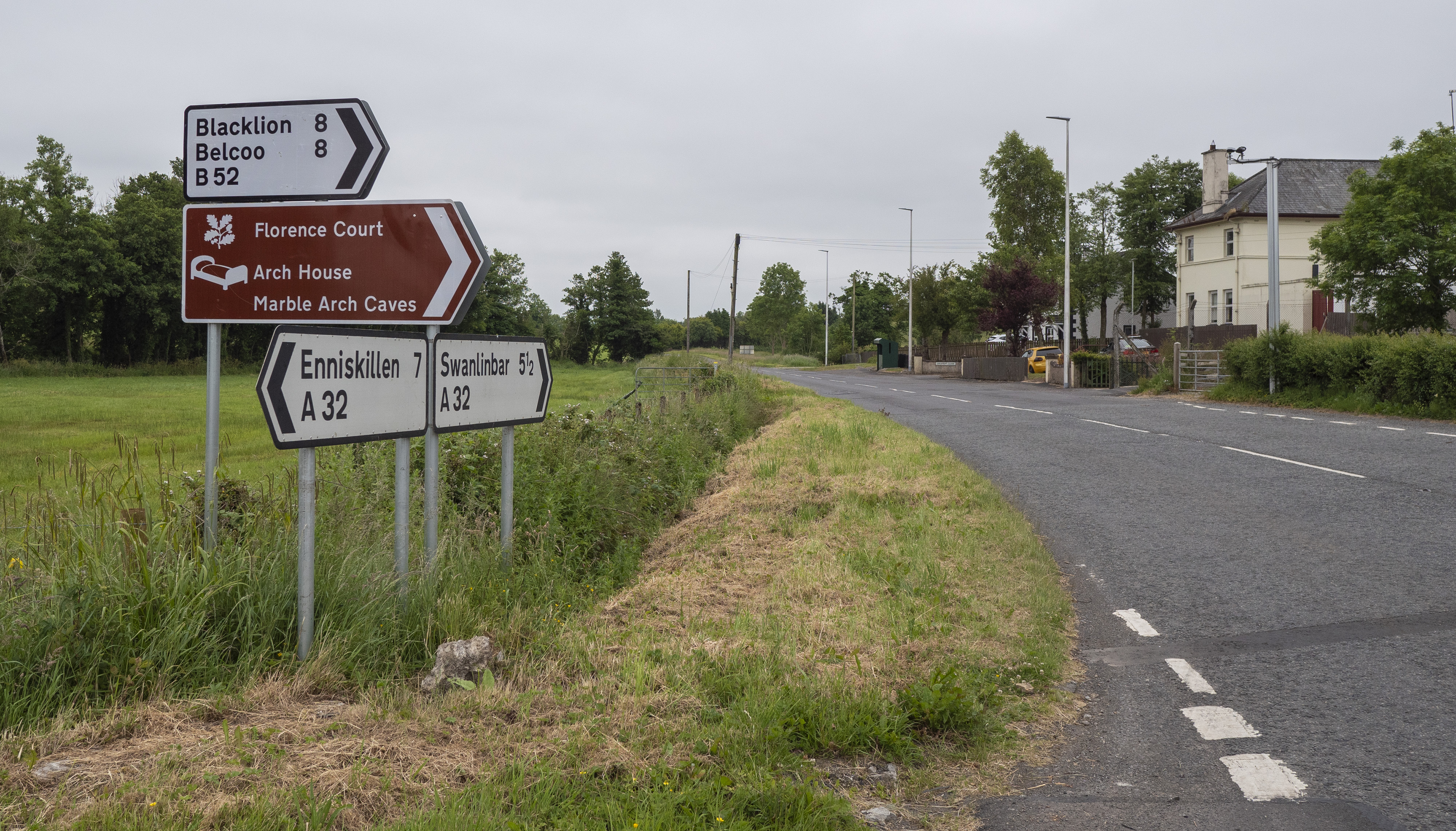
- Road signs in Drumlaghy

- Location within Northern Ireland
- Population: 102 with Florencecourt (2021 census)
- District: Fermanagh and Omagh
- County: County Fermanagh
- Country: Northern Ireland
- Sovereign state: United Kingdom
- Postcode district: BT
- Dialling code: 028
- UK Parliament: Fermanagh and South Tyrone
- NI Assembly: Fermanagh and South Tyrone

Drumlaghy (from Irish: Druim Lathaighe) is a small village and townland in County Fermanagh, Northern Ireland. In the 2021 census it had a population (with Florencecourt) of 102 people. It is situated within Fermanagh and Omagh district, near the listed building Florence Court.
