= Forestry in Ireland =

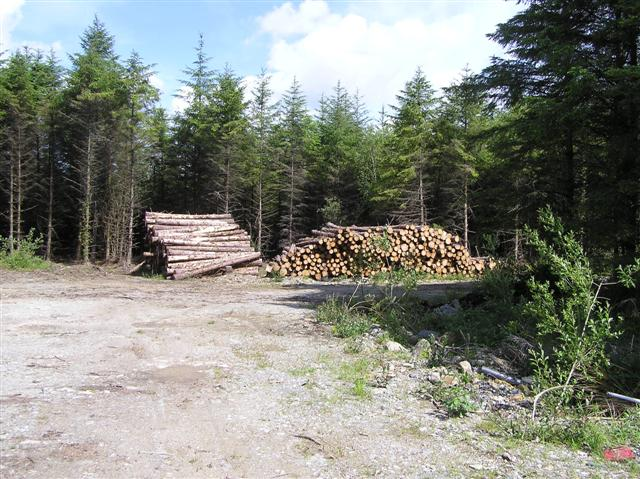
Timber harvesting near Carndonagh in Donegal

Forestry is a significant industry in Ireland, supporting an estimated 9,400 direct and indirect jobs, and contributing over €2 billion to the economy. Despite this, the country has one of the lowest rates of forest cover in the European Union, at 11.6% in 2022, (Note: In 2023, forest cover in the European Union was 38.2%.) however this is a significant increase from less than 2% at the beginning of the 20th century, (Note: The forest cover of the Irish state was 1.4% at its foundation in 1922.) and is the highest level in over 350 years.

The total forest area of country was 808,848 hectares in 2022, an increase from 697,842 hectares in 2006. 50.9% of forests are in private ownership (411,484 ha), with the remainder (397,364 ha or 49.1%) in public ownership (mainly Coillte); this is an increase of the share of forests in private ownership by over 7.9% since 2006. In 2022, broadleaf tree species made up 30.6% of forest cover, an increase of 5.9% since 2006, however conifer species remained dominant at 69.4%.

== History ==
=== Neolithic ===
Following the last Ice Age, 80% of Ireland was covered in forests. The arrival of Neolithic farmers in Ireland resulted in the widespread clearance of the island's (mainly deciduous) forests to create land for farming and settlements, however when soil fertility was exhausted farmers would cultivate another area of land and forests were allowed to regrow.

== See also ==
- List of forests in Ireland
- Deforestation by continent § Ireland
