= Native trees of Ireland =

The following is a list of the native trees of Ireland.

Number	Latin name	Standard name	Other name	Irish name	Irish placename reference	Image
1	Quercus petraea	Sessile oak	Irish oak	Dair Ghaelach	Derry = Doire	
2	Quercus robur	Pedunculate oak	English oak	Dair Ghallda	Kildare = Cill Dara	
3	Prunus spinosa	Blackthorn	Sloe	Draighean	Drinagh = Draighneach	
4	Fraxinus excelsior	Ash		Fuinseóg	Ashtown = Baile na Fuinseoige	
5	Sorbus aucuparia	Rowan	Mountain ash	Caorthann	Drumkeeran = Droim Caorthainn	
6	Aquifoliaceae	Holly		Cuileann	Moycullen = Maigh Cuilinn	
7	Pinus sylvestris	Scots pine		An Giúis	N/A, native only in ancient times so has a limited contribution to placenames	
8	Taxus baccata	Yew	Irish Yew	Iúr	Terenure = Tír an Iúir	
9	Salix aurita	Eared willow	Sally tree	Saileach	Clonsilla = Cluain Saileach	
10	Salix caprea	Goat willow	Pussy willow	Saileach	Recess = Sraith Saileach	
11	Salix cinerea	Grey willow		Saileach	"	
12	Salix alba	White willow		Saileach	"	
13	Alnus	Alder		Fearnóg	Ferns = Fearna	
14	Corylus avellana	Hazel		Coll	Dromcolliher = Collachair	
15	Prunus avium	Wild cherry		Gean – Crann silíní fiáin		
16	Prunus padus	Bird cherry		Donnroisc		
17	Ulmus glabra	Elm	Wych Elm	Leamhán Sléibhe	Lucan = Leamhcán	
18	Betula pendula	Silver birch		Beith Gheal	Glenveagh = Gleann Bheatha	
19	Betula pubescens	Downy birch		Beith Chlúmhach	Ballybay = Béal Átha Beithe	
20	Juniperus communis	Common juniper	Juniper	Aiteal	Ardattin = Ard Aitinn	
21	Crataegus monogyna	Hawthorn	Whitethorn	Sceach Gheal	Upper Lough Skeagh = Lough sceach	
22	Populus tremula	Aspen	Poplar	Crann Creathach	Cratloe = An Chreatalach	
23	Aria hibernica	Whitebeam	Irish whitebeam	Fionncholl		
24	Arbutus unedo	Strawberry tree	Arbutus	Caithne	Ard na Caithne	
25	Malus sylvestris	Crab apple		Crann Fia-úll		
26	Viburnum opulus	Guelder rose		Caorchon		
27	Euonymus europaeus	Spindle		Feoras	Feorus West, County Kerry	
28	Sambucus nigra	Elder		Tromán	Trim = Troim	

== See also ==
- List of forests in Ireland
- Flora of Ireland
