= Flora of Ireland =

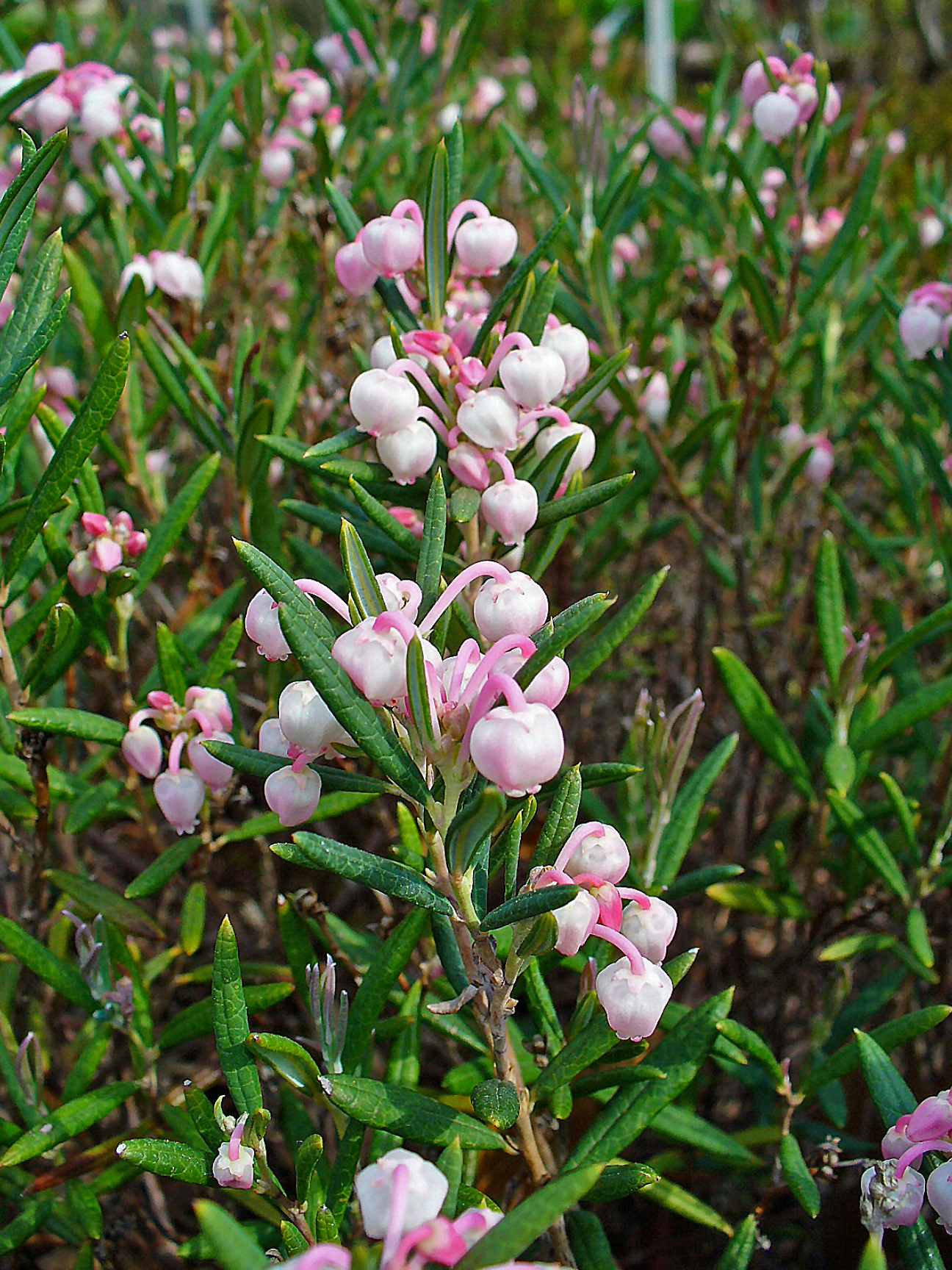
Bog rosemary: the county flower of County Offaly

Ireland is in the Atlantic European Province of the Circumboreal Region, a floristic region within the Holarctic.

== Composition of the flora ==
Ireland has a small flora for a European country because of its small size, lack of geological and ecological variation and its Pleistocene history. There are 3,815 species of plant listed for Ireland:

- Phylum Anthocerotophyta – hornworts: 3 species
- Phylum Bryophyta – mosses: 556 species
- Phylum Charophyta – charophytes: 244 species
- Phylum Chlorophyta – green algae: 148 species
- Phylum Lycopodiophyta – clubmosses: 9 species
- Phylum Magnoliophyta – flowering plants: 2,196 species
- Phylum Marchantiophyta – liverworts: 229 species
- Phylum Pinophyta – pines: 12 species
- Phylum Pteridophyta – ferns: 79 species
- Phylum Rhodophyta – red algae: 339 species

An additional 2,512 species of fungus occur in Ireland.

- Phylum Acrasiomycota – cellular slime molds: 1 species
- Phylum Ascomycota – sac fungi: 1,115 species
- Phylum Basidiomycota – club fungi, mushrooms, shelf fungi, puff balls: 1,228 species
- Phylum Chytridiomycota – chytrids: 4 species
- Phylum Microsporidia – 1 species
- Phylum Myxomycota – plasmodial slime moulds: 112 species
- Phylum Oomycota – water moulds: 40 species
- Phylum Zygomycota – pin or sugar moulds: 11 species

== History of the flora: after the Pleistocene ==
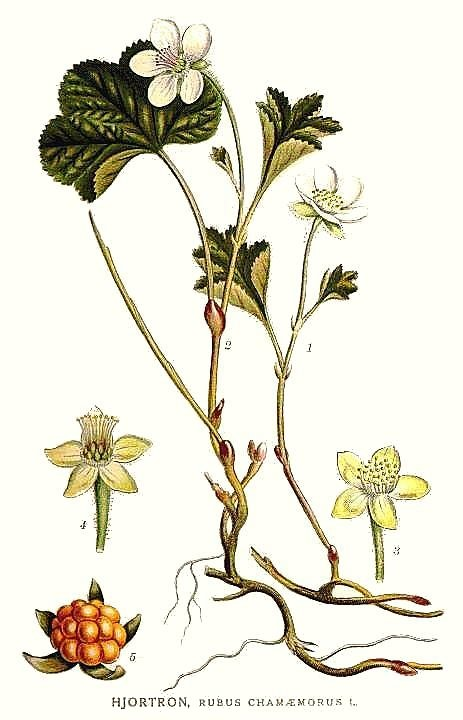
Cloudberry, Rubus chamaemorus: a relict plant of the Ice Age

Ice-sheets covered most of Ireland until 13,000 years ago when the Holocene began. The majority of Ireland's flora and fauna has only returned as the ice sheets retreated and sea level rose accompanied by post-glacial rebound when 10,000 years ago the climate began to warm. At this time there was a land bridge connecting Wales and the east coast of Ireland since sea levels were over 100 metres lower than they are today (water being frozen into the ice caps covering northern Asia and North America). Plants and animals were able to cross this land-bridge until about 7,500 years ago, when it was finally covered by the rising sea level as warming continued.

Mesolithic hunters entered Ireland around 8000 BC beginning human occupation and from the Neolithic landscape was progressively altered by agriculture, especially in the 19th and 20th centuries. Ireland now has the sixth most anthropogenically-modified woodland cover in the world. Aside from the habitat alteration new species were introduced deliberately or accidentally. The archaeologist Emmet Byrnes and botanist Declan Little, Woodlands of Ireland give a history of woodlands in Ireland.

== Habitats ==
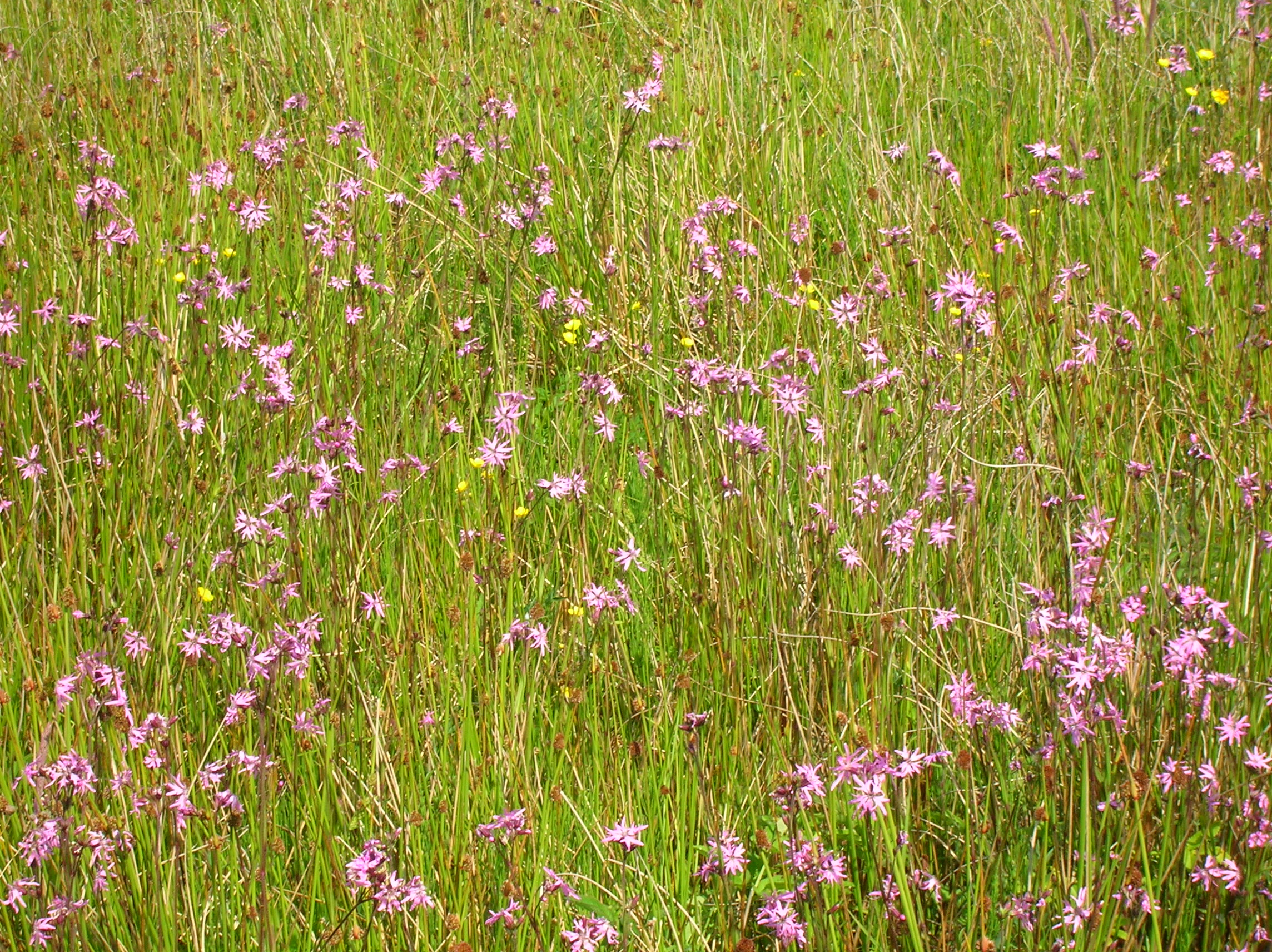
Lowland meadow grasses with ragged robin (Lychnis flos-cuculi) and hawkweed (Hieracium)

There are two major habitats, making up most of the land area:

=== Grassland ===
Grassland includes Lowland meadow and pasture with grasses such as sweet vernal grass, perennial ryegrass, meadow foxtail, false oat-grass, crested dog's-tail, Festuca rubra, red fescue, downy oat-grass, Yorkshire fog, timothy grass and yellow oat-grass.

Lowland meadow and pasture flowers include meadow thistle, creeping thistle, spear thistle, pignut, lesser knapweed, meadow thistle, smooth hawksbeard, eyebright, ragged robin, red bartsia, yellow rattle, marsh lousewort, cowslip, catsear, autumn hawkbit, meadow buttercup, bulbous buttercup and dandelion

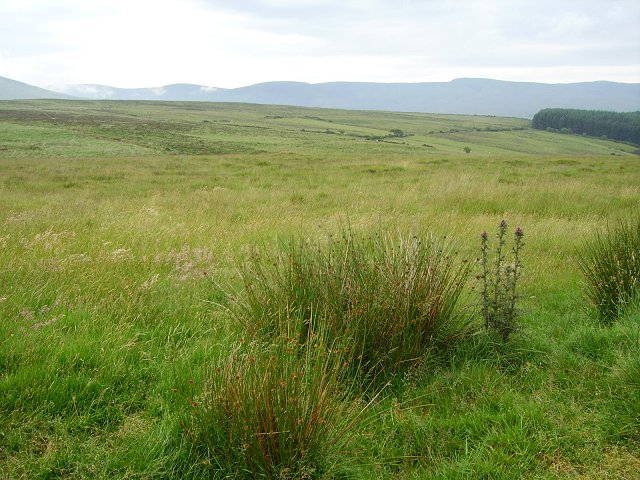
Rough grazing in the Comeraghs

Upland pasture (mostly semi-natural, that is maintained by particular farming practices such as grazing and mowing). Typical species are: moor matgrass, wavy hair-grass, species of Agrostis, sheep's fescue, green-ribbed sedge, cross-leaved heath, bell heather, bilberry, black crowberry, deergrass and bog asphodel.

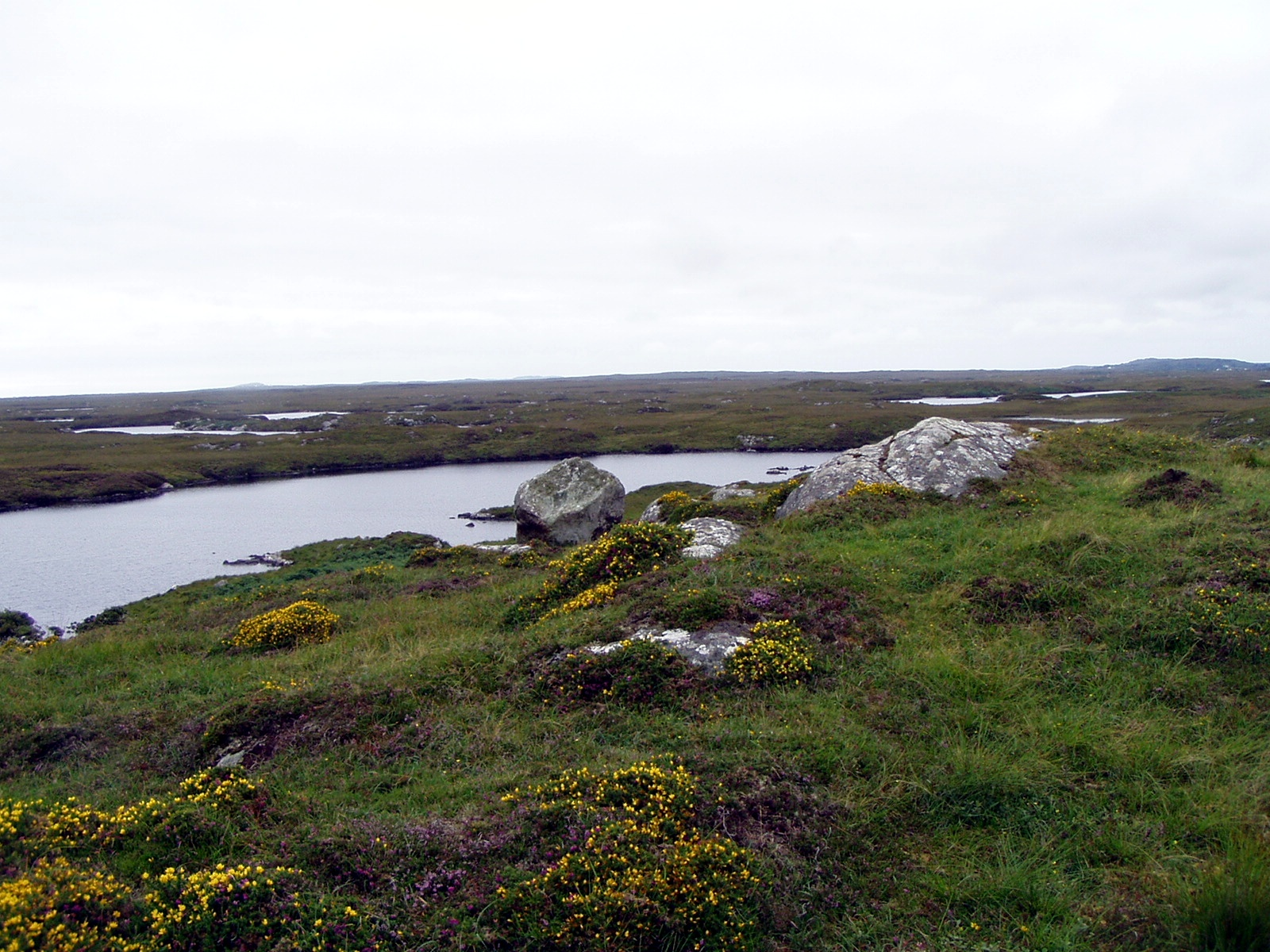
Bog in Connemara

=== Bogs ===
==== Importance ====
Ireland possesses almost 200,000 hectares (490,000 acres) of actively growing bogs and fens. This compares with 126,000 ha (310,000 acres) in the United Kingdom, 500 ha (1,200 acres) each in Switzerland and Germany and total loss in the Netherlands and Poland. In Ireland in 1998 there were 23,628 ha (58,390 acres) of raised bog at 164 sites (8% of original area), 143,248 ha (353,970 acres) of blanket bog at 233 sites (18% of original area) and 54,026 ha (133,500 acres) hectares of fen at 221 sites (58% of original area). These 200,000 hectares of actively growing raised and blanket bogs and fens are of European conservation importance.

==== Formation ====
In Ireland two factors led to the formation of such extensive peatlands. High rainfall – there are 175 rain-days each year in the west, southwest and northwest of Ireland – and poor drainage. The bogs formed at the end of the last ice age, about 10,000 years ago, in the central lowlands of Ireland in basins of calcareous boulder clay. These became lakes overgrown with fen vegetation and infilled with fen peat which cut off the surface plants from mineral-rich water below. Nutrient-demanding fen plants were then replaced by bog mosses and plants which could survive on low levels of nutrients. The fen peat below prevented the rainwater draining away and the sponge-like bog moss and plants soaked it up.

==== Bog flora ====
The vascular plants characteristic of raised bogs (an example is the Bog of Allen) include: common heather, cross-leaved heath, bell heather, bogbean, hare's-tail cottongrass, common cottongrass, bog-rosemary, common cranberry, bog asphodel, bog myrtle, Pedicularis sylvatica, round-leaved sundew, oblong-leaved sundew, great sundew, royal fern, species of Utricularia, Juncus squarrosus, common tormentil, black bogrush, bog orchid, Slender Scottish Eyebright (Euphrasia scottica), heath bedstraw, green-ribbed sedge, little green sedge, black crowberry, moor matgrass, soft rush, northern firmoss and wolf's-foot clubmoss.

Cut-out raised bogs are colonised by a wet woodland of birch and alder trees. Characteristic species are downy birch, black alder, grey willow, crack willow, broad buckler fern, narrow buckler fern and remote sedge.

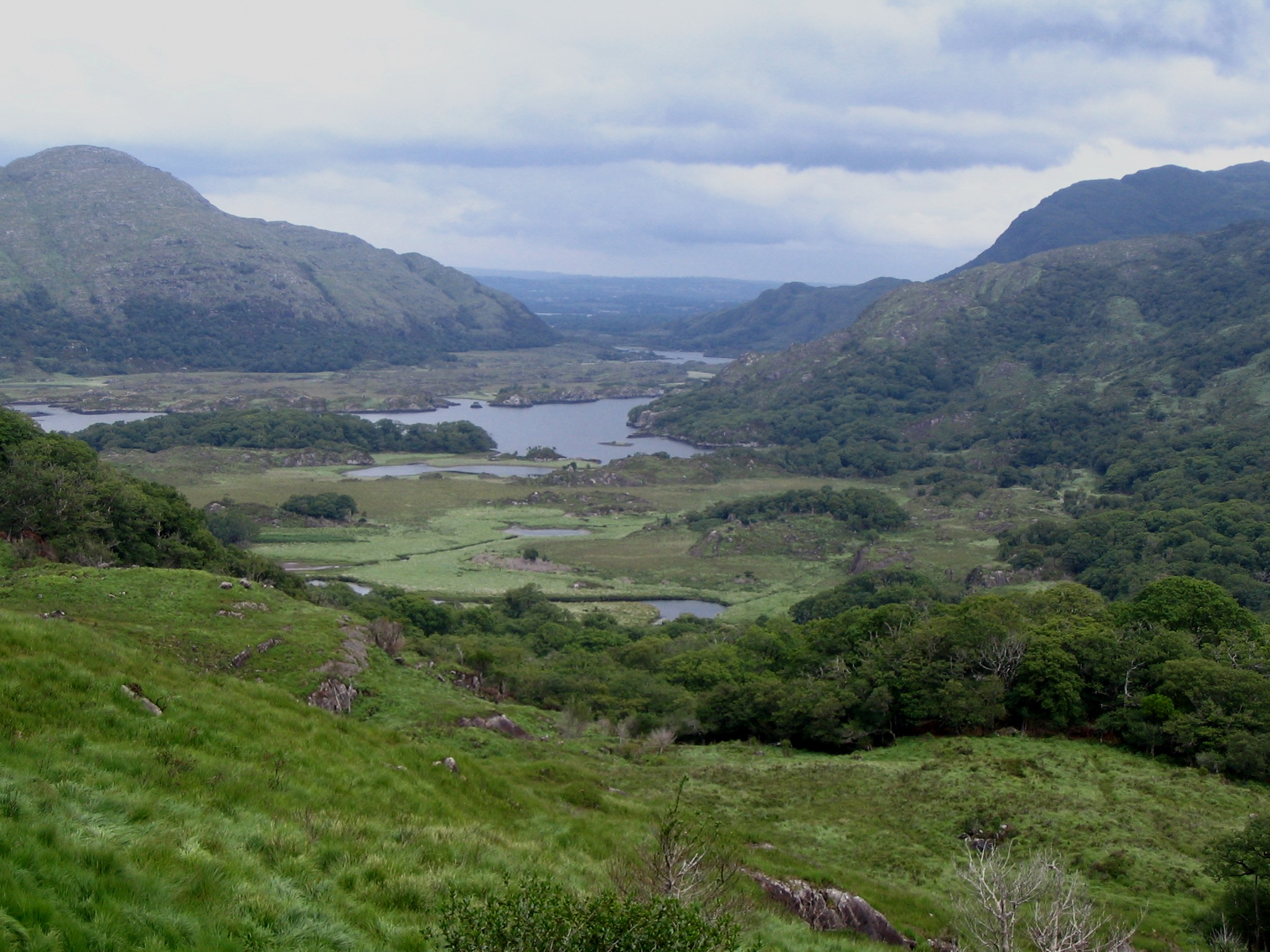
Lakes seen from Ladies View, Killarney, Co. Kerry

=== Open water ===
Open water habitats include rivers, canals, lakes, reservoirs, ponds and, uniquely, turloughs. Common species of wet places include common reed, marsh willowherb, common marsh bedstraw, water avens, angelica, brooklime, marsh pennywort, water plantain, marsh cinquefoil, marsh marigold, watermint, yellow water lily, bulrush and the invasive species Canadian pondweed.

=== Sea shore ===
A much smaller fraction is occupied by coastal habitats (muddy shores, rocky shores, sandy shores, shingle beaches, brackish water bodies, saltmarsh, maritime flushes and streams, sea cliffs and sand dunes and machair).

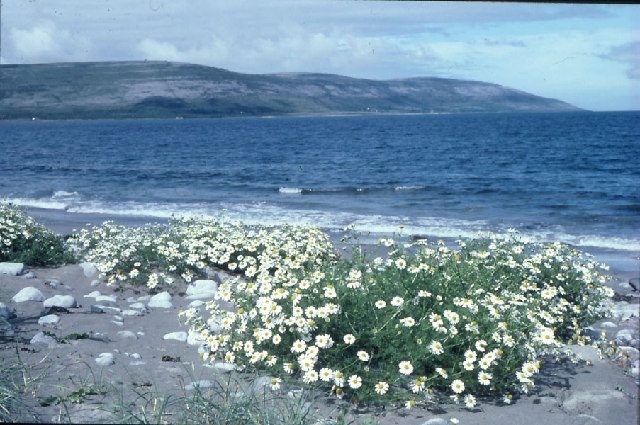
Sea mayweed (Tripleurospermum maritimum), Bishopsquarter, Co. Galway

Significant or characteristic species of sand dunes and dune slacks are: Ammophila arenaria, seaside sandplant, sea milkwort, pyramidal orchid, sea holly, sea lyme grass, heartsease, houndstongue, common centaury, fairy flax, seashore false bindweed, dovesfoot cranesbill, bee orchid and stone bramble. Saltmarsh species include Salicornia europaea, sea purslane, sea arrowgrass, greater sea-spurry and common scurvygrass.

=== Karst ===
Karst, inland cliffs and scarps

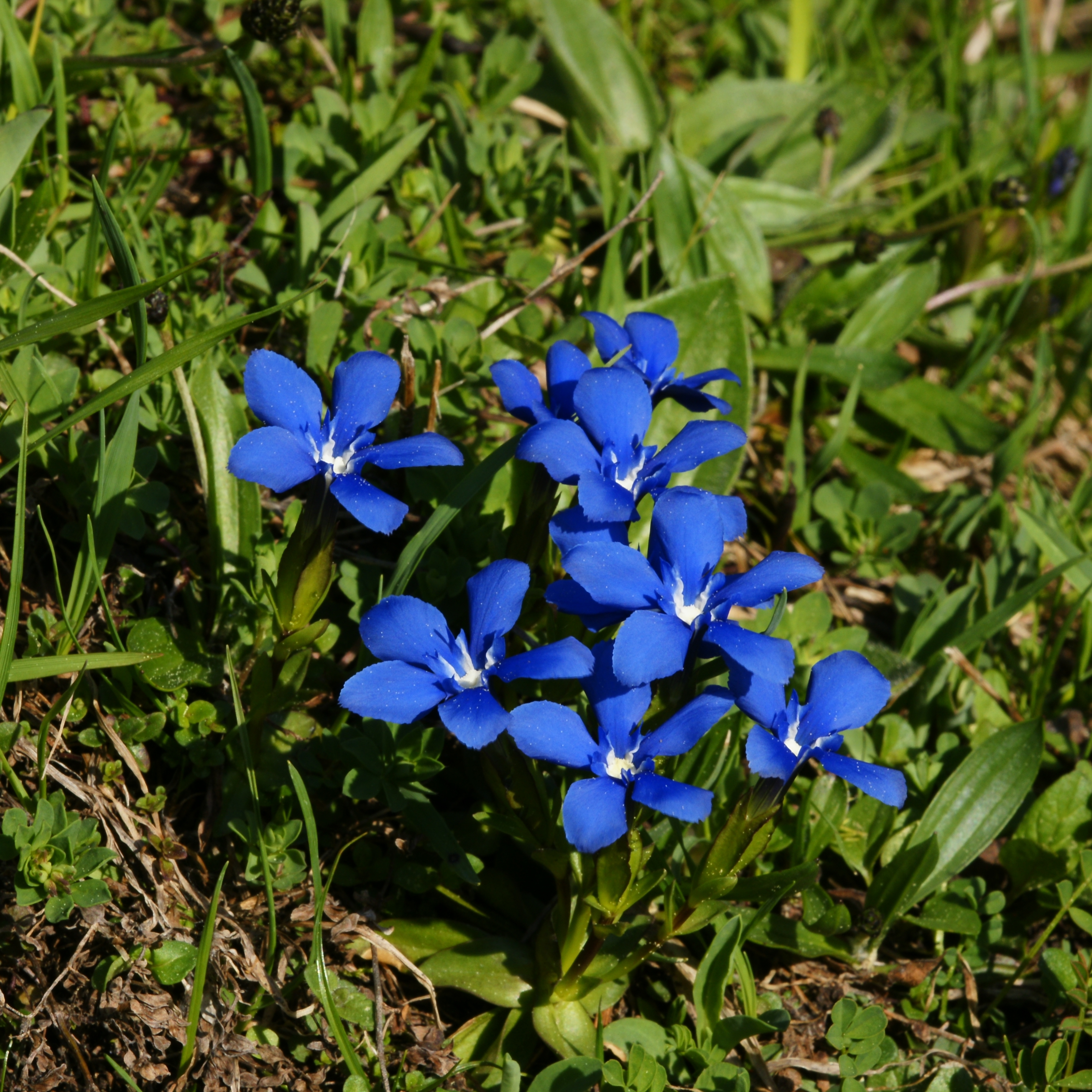
Spring gentian, Gentiana verna – an alpine plant found in the Burren, often close to Mediterranean species

==== The Burren ====
Over 70% of Ireland's 900 native species occur in The Burren which is less than 0.5% of the area of Ireland. The Burren contains twelve Annex 1 habitats listed in the EU Habitats Directive. A 2001 survey found 28 different species per square meter (averaged over 1,100 vegetation samples) in upland grasslands, with up to 45 species per square metre in some samples. 22 of Ireland's 27 native orchid species are found in the region. Such high diversity has several explanations. Firstly, several hundred square kilometers of species-rich unimproved limestone grasslands and upland pastures grazed mainly in winter, a practice which removes potentially dominant grass and weed species. Secondly, there is a mixture of Arctic–alpine and Mediterranean species, and calcicole and calcifuge species. The area is dominated by bare rock and rendzina soils.

=== Woodland ===
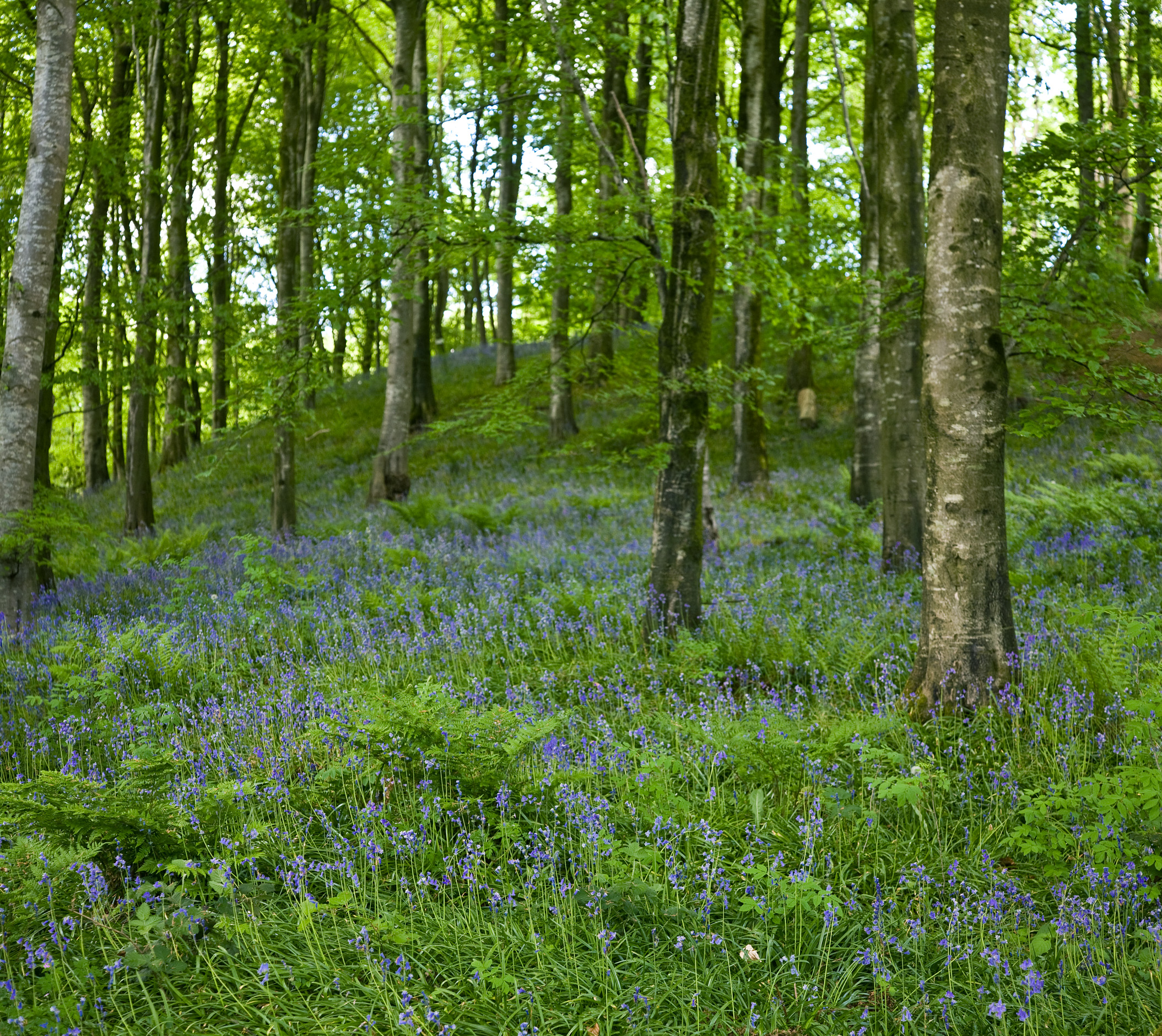
Woodland at Portglenone, Co. Antrim

Woodland plants include wood sorrel, blackthorn, bird's nest orchid, wood anemone, bluebell, wood avens, bugle, ramsons, self-heal, dog violet, honeysuckle, holly, lords and ladies, herb robert and woody nightshade. Woods dominated by oak and birch, with lesser amounts of rowan, holly, hazel, yew and aspen are called western oakwoods and occur principally in the uplands of Ireland, Scotland and Wales. They are temperate rainforests.

=== Artificial habitats ===
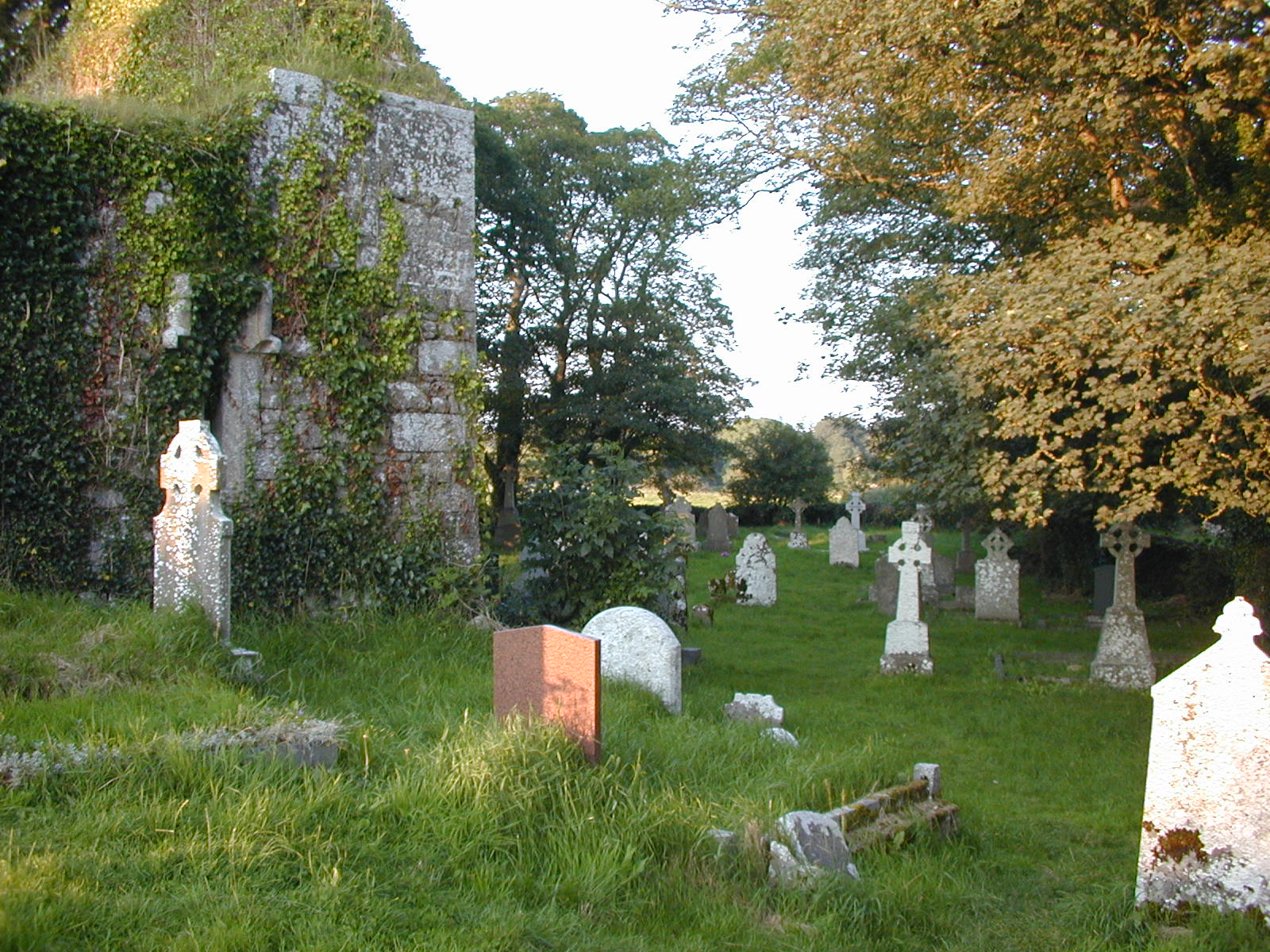
Ireland's many graveyards are important floristic sanctuaries.

Quarries, gravel and sand pits, roads and railways, field boundaries, walls, waste ground and rubbish tips contain such plant species as common ragwort, pineapple weed, hairy bindweed, creeping buttercup, common daisy, catsear, coltsfoot, fat hen, nettle, redshank, germander speedwell, ivy-leaved toadflax, rosebay willowherb, great willowherb and wall pennywort.

Cultivated ground (arable and horticultural land)

Julie A. Fossitt gives a habitat classification.

== Conservation ==
Threats to the flora include agriculture, drainage, housing developments, golf courses, mowing of roadside verges and introduced species. Conservation agencies include the National Parks and Wildlife Service (Ireland), the Northern Ireland Environment Agency, the Environmental Protection Agency and the Royal Society for the Protection of Birds. There is a Threatened Species Programme at the National Botanic Gardens. There was also a range of Non-Governmental Organisations in Ireland dedicated to preserving plant habitats such as the Irish Peatland Conservation Council, the Irish Wildlife Trust and the Native Woodland Trust.

== Herbaria ==
Major herbaria are conserved at the National Botanic Gardens and the Ulster Museum.

== See also ==
- Atlases of the flora and fauna of Britain and Ireland
- National Parks in the Republic of Ireland
- List of Special Areas of Conservation in Northern Ireland
- British National Vegetation Classification - broadly applicable but see Fossitt (2000).
- Trees of Britain and Ireland
- Native trees of Ireland
- List of the orchids of Ireland
- Landforms of Ireland Category:Landforms of Ireland
- Lusitanian flora
- Invasion biology terminology

History of botany in Ireland

- Topographia Hibernica An early (1180) account of the flora by Gerald of Wales.
- Thomas Dix Hincks On early Contributions to the Flora of Ireland; with Remarks on Mr. Mackay's Flora Hibernica Annals and Magazine of Natural History 6: 1-12 continued 126-135 (1841) and
- Caleb Threlkeld
- John Templeton
- Thomas Coulter
- Clare Island Survey
