= Hanging Rock, County Fermanagh =

Cliff in County Fermanagh, Northern Ireland

Coordinates: 54.257°N 7.704°W

Hanging Rock is a large limestone cliff with an obtuse angle. It is located beside the village of Florencecourt in County Fermanagh, Northern Ireland, and is part of the Cuilcagh mountain region. The cliff is situated in an area dedicated The Hanging Rock Nature Reserve, which is in turn part of the Marble Arch Caves Global Geopark.

== History ==
Hanging Rock has long been a notable landmark in the area. Referring to the rock as "Gortatowell Rock" (referencing the townland of today's Gortatole), in his publication "Upper Lough Erne", 1739, Reverend William Henry wrote:

"Just under the brow of the cliff... lies the great new road leading towards Sligo. It is usual for passengers to stop here and admire the awful [sic] majesty of the cliff hanging over them, and the huge lumps of rock that have tumbled down from it, and to entertain themselves with the extraordinary echo frequently reverberated between the lake below and the hollowness of the cliff."

== Geology and hydrology ==
The cliff is formed chiefly from limestone, specifically Dartry overlaying Glencar formation. The point where the two formations join is visible at the base of the cliff.

Two stream risings lay at the base of the cliff, known as the Hanging Rock Risings. One of the risings is constantly active, while the other dries up during times of low rainfall. The risings are traced to only one source, Legacapple on the Marlbank above, but the water is believed to combine from a number of other sources.

== Flora and fauna ==
The Hanging Rock Nature Reserve at the base of the cliff consists of damp ash woodland, an endangered woodland system within Ireland and the United Kingdom.

Historically, the cliff was home to eagles, hawks and jackdaws.

== Salter's Stone ==
A large boulder sits prominently by the roadside, having fallen from the cliff at some time in the past. It lies on the original road from Florencecourt to Blacklion and local folklore states that it landed on top of a wandering salt merchant who was travelling along the road at the time. It is said that whenever the rock was found the next day that there was a ring of salt surrounding it. The rock became known as the Salter's Stone, or Cloghogue.
