= Markethill =

Village in County Armagh, Northern Ireland

Coordinates: 54.2985°N 6.5214°W

- Town
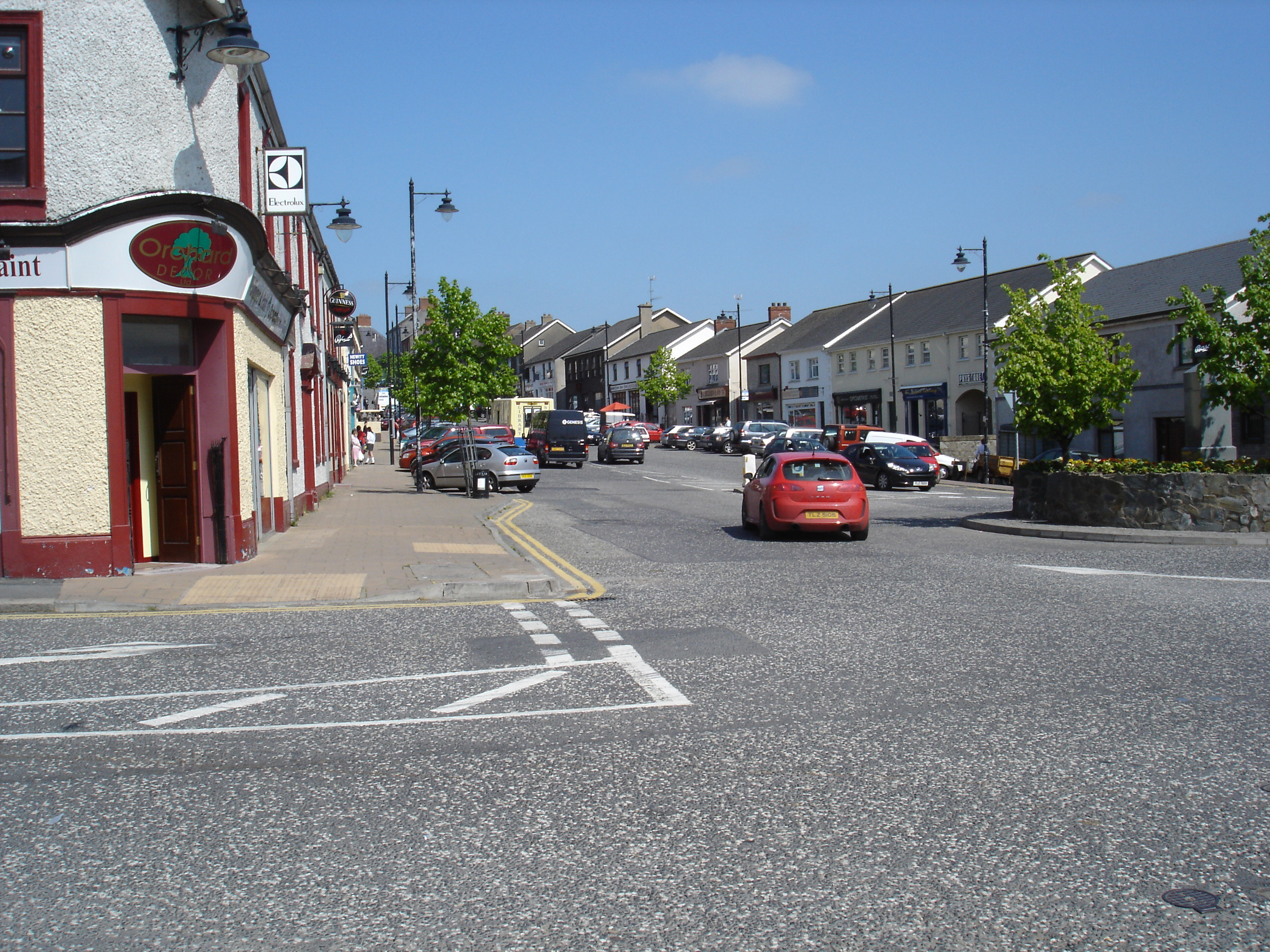

- Location within Northern Ireland
- Population: 1,647 (2011 census)
- Irish grid reference: H962398
  - Belfast: 40 miles
- District: Armagh City, Banbridge and Craigavon
- County: County Armagh
- Country: Northern Ireland
- Sovereign state: United Kingdom
- Post town: ARMAGH
- Postcode district: BT60
- Dialling code: 028, +44 28
- UK Parliament: Newry & Armagh
- NI Assembly: Newry & Armagh

Markethill is a village in County Armagh, Northern Ireland. It is beside Gosford Forest Park. It had a population of 1,647 people in the 2011 census. A livestock market is held here three times a week and each summer the world's largest Lambeg drumming contest takes place in the village.

Markethill is located by the A28 road around 10 kilometres (6 mi) south-east of Armagh city, and 18 kilometres (11 mi) north-west of Newry.

== History ==
The village sprang up within the townland of Coolmallish or Coolmillish (Irish: Cúil Mheallghuis), on the road between Armagh and Newry. It began to grow during the Plantation of Ulster as a town for Scottish and English migrants.

=== The Troubles ===
During the Troubles, there were a number of incidents in Markethill, including a number which resulted in fatalities.

- On 24 June 1979 an off-duty UDR soldier was shot dead by the IRA while at his home in Markethill, County Armagh.
- On 22 October 1982 an off-duty UDR soldier (Thomas Cochrane) was kidnapped while travelling to work, Glennane, near Markethill, County Armagh. Found shot dead at Lislea, near Camlough, County Armagh, seven days later on 29 October 1982.
- On 16 November 1982 the Irish National Liberation Army (INLA) shot dead two RUC officers (Ronald Irwin and Snowdon Corkey) at a security barrier in Markethill. INLA members fired several shots from a car before turning around and escaping the village.
- On 8 September 1992 the IRA shot and critically wounded a Protestant civilian at his home near Markethill, County Armagh. Afterwards the IRA claimed he was a member of the British Army's Royal Irish Regiment.

== Places of interest ==
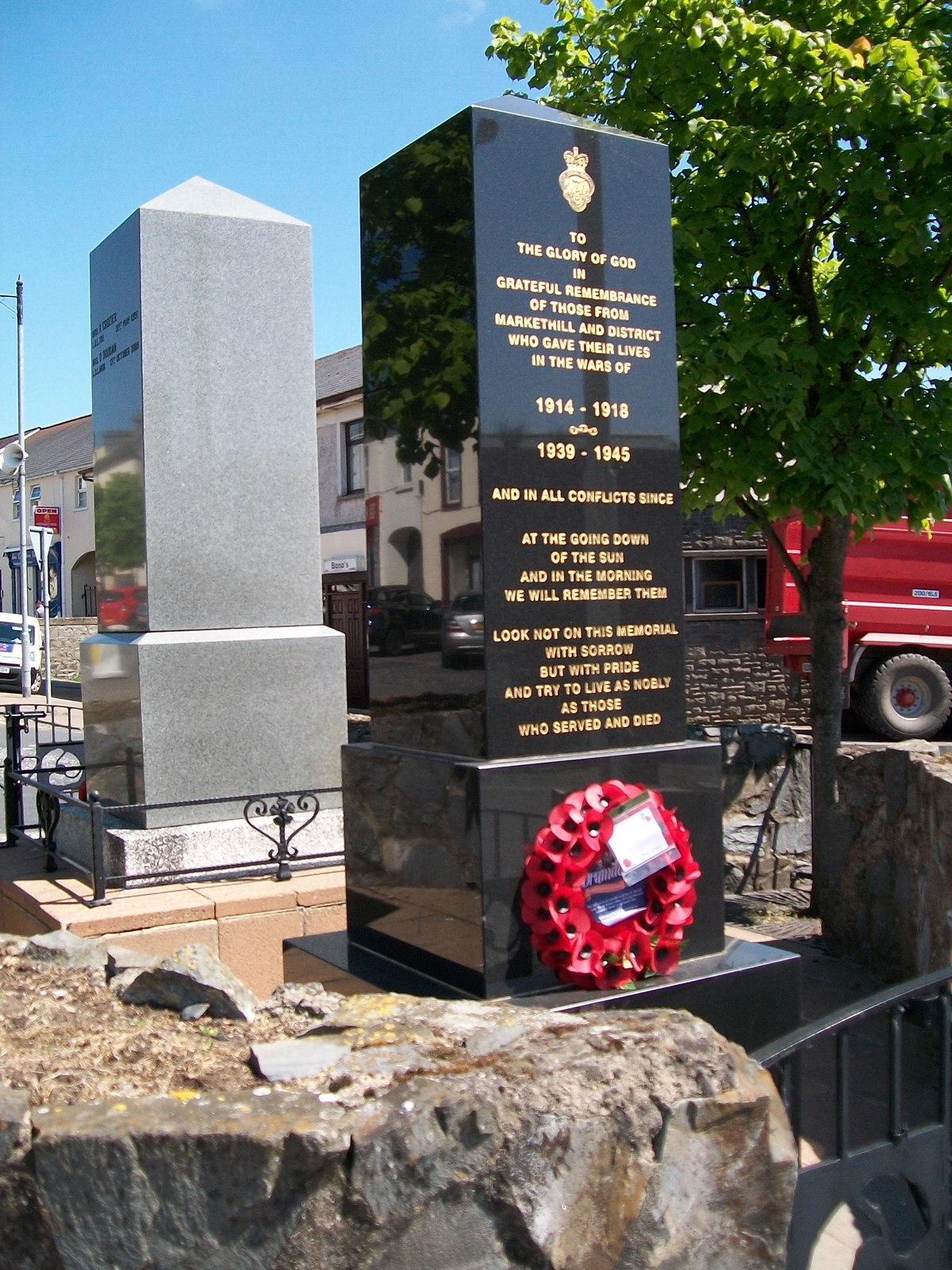
Markethill War Memorial

Nearby Gosford Castle is within Gosford Forest Park. The Ministry of Agriculture bought the estate in 1958, establishing Gosford Forest Park. Gosford Castle is the largest Grade A listed building in Northern Ireland, in 2006 after public consultation the Boyd Partnership was selected to restore the castle and convert it into 24 self-contained luxury apartments. The first residents moved in December 2008, restoration is still in progress as of May 2010.

Markethill Courthouse, situated at the top of Main Street, at the north entrance to Markethill adjacent to Gosford Forest Park. Markethill Courthouse was built in 1842 to the designs of Thomas Duff, and is one of the few surviving large regional free standing Courthouses built in the middle century. The building is constructed of random Blackstone with Armagh limestone quoins and dressings. The building was last used as a courthouse in 1952, was purchased by Markethill District Enterprises Ltd in June 1997, after lying vacant for 25 years. The building was restored for use as a community centre.

The Markethill War Memorial is located in the centre of the town. It commemorates World War I and World War II. Beside it, is an Orange Order Memorial.

== Music ==
Markethill is home to several marching bands, each holding a parade in the town:

- Kilcluney Volunteers Flute Band
- Markethill Protestant Boys Flute Band
- Mullaghbrack Accordion Band
- Markethill Pipe Band

== Sport ==
Markethill Swifts F.C., an association football club, play in the Mid-Ulster Football League.

== Transport ==
Markethill railway station opened on 25 August 1864, closed for passenger traffic on 1 February 1933 and finally closed altogether on 2 May 1955. It was located on the Armagh to Goraghwood section of line run by the Great Northern Railway of Ireland.

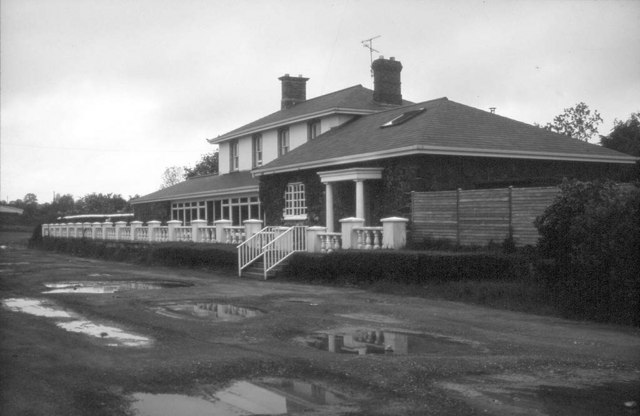
Markethill railway station in 1970 on the line constructed by the Newry and Armagh Railway.

== Demography ==
Markethill is classified as a village by the Northern Ireland Statistics and Research Agency (NISRA) (i.e. with population between 1,000 and 2,499 people). On census day in 2011 (27 March 2011), the usually resident population of Markethill Settlement was 1,647, accounting for 0.09% of the NI total. Of these:

- 22.53% were under 16 years old and 17.06% were aged 65 and above;
- 47.48% of the population were male and 52.52% were female; and
- 17.00% were from a Catholic community background and 77.9% were from a 'Protestant and Other Christian (including Christian related)' community background.

== Education ==
Schools in the area include Markethill Primary School and Markethill High School.

== Economy ==
The first significant industrial capacity in the town was established in 1888 by DH Sinton who established a linen mill, close to the town's railway station. The mill was purchased by Spence, Bryson & Co. Ltd in 1909 and remained operational until 1991 when it was badly damaged by an IRA bomb. Production at this point moved to a sister factory in nearby Portadown.

Today the area is largely focused on agriculture and is centred on the large agricultural mart situated on the Cladymilltown Road on the outskirts of the town. Markethill Livestock Sales has been established for more than 45 years. The previous mart premises subsequently became a derelict site.

A small business park has been constructed on a section of the former Spence, Bryson & Co. Ltd Linen Mill which contains a number of small business' and start-up enterprises. The business park is administered by Markethill Business Centre on Fairgreen Road.

There are several independent businesses located in the town. These include Alexander's of Markethill and Alexanders Furnishings Ltd., established in 1954 and operating from the old Market House, Keady Street with the furniture shop on Fairgreen Road nearby. Dalzell's of Markethill, an electrical appliances company, was established in 1956.

== People ==
- Kenny Hooks, Irish rugby international player (IRFU)
- George Lambert, recipient of the Victoria Cross
- Seamus Mallon, first Deputy First Minister of Northern Ireland and former deputy leader of the SDLP
- Emma Little-Pengelly, fifth Deputy First Minister of Northern Ireland, current MLA and former MP

== See also ==
- Market houses in Northern Ireland
