= Markethill High School =

Location
- 61 Mowhan Road; Markethill, County Armagh, BT60 1RQ; Northern Ireland; 54.291°N 6.520°W

Information
- Type: All-Ability
- Established: 1959
- Local authority: County Armargh
- Principal: Colin Berry
- Gender: Co-educational
- Age: 11 to 16
- Enrolment: c. 490
- Houses: Gosford; Witherow; Glendinning; Magowan
- website: www.markethillhighschool.net

Markethill High School is a secondary school located in Markethill, County Armagh, Northern Ireland. The school caters for 11- to 16-year-olds and (as of 2007) had 490 pupils. It is within the Southern Education and Library Board area.

== History ==
The school opened in 1959, and was renovated and extended in 1985. Its principals have included:

- 1959 - 1984 Mr J.McCartney
- 1984 - 1994 Mr W.G.S.Parr
- 1994 - 2011 Mr S.J.Loughrey
- 2011–2019 Mr J.A.Maxwell
- 2019–present Mr Colin Berry

In 2011, the school opened a new fitness suite and gymnasium.

In March 2012 the school won the British Academy Award for the Best Mainstream School for Modern Languages in Northern Ireland. In addition, the school was shortlisted to the final 3 entries for the Best Mainstream School in the UK for Modern Languages. In January 2012, the school won £4000 to fund a STEM project (Science / Technology / Engineering / Mathematics) based its cross-curricular initiative.
