= Gosford Castle =

Castle in County Armagh, Northern Ireland

Coordinates: 54.3108°N 6.5192°W

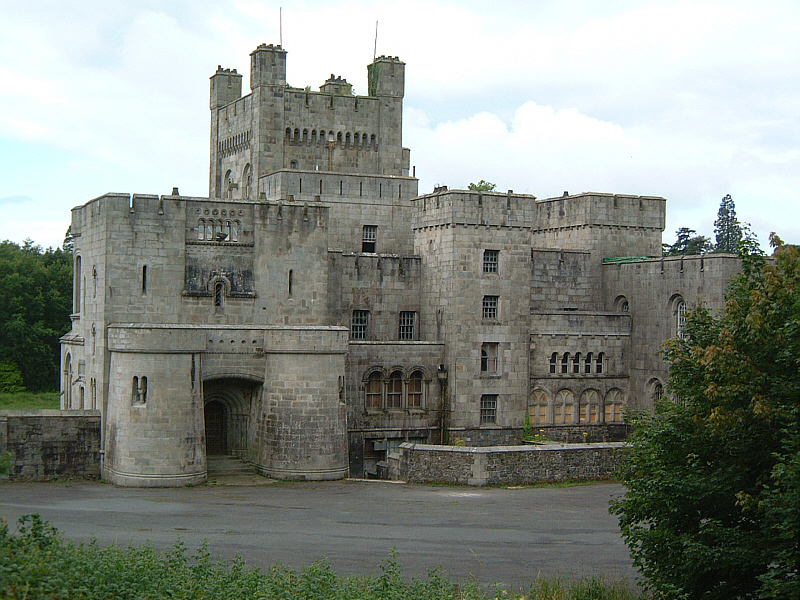
Gosford Castle, entrance front

Gosford Castle is a 19th-century country house situated in Gosford, a townland of Markethill, County Armagh, Northern Ireland. It was built for Archibald Acheson, 2nd Earl of Gosford, and designed in the Norman revival style by London architect Thomas Hopper. It is a Grade A listed building, and is said to be Ulster's largest. The Earls of Gosford occupied the castle until 1921, and the estate was later purchased by the Ministry of Agriculture to form Gosford Forest Park. The building subsequently deteriorated and in 2006 was sold to a development company who converted the castle into private dwellings.

== History ==
The Acheson family were granted land in County Armagh by King James VI & I in 1610, at the start of the Plantation of Ulster. They established the village of Markethill and built a castle, though this was destroyed during the Irish Rebellion of 1641. A manor house was built in its place, which the Achesons occupied until 1840. The writer Jonathan Swift (1667–1745) visited Gosford and contributed to the layout of the gardens. In 1819, Archibald Acheson, 2nd Earl of Gosford (1776–1849), then head of the Acheson dynasty, commissioned Thomas Hopper (1776–1856) to design a new house at Gosford. A Norman revival style of architecture was chosen, marking Hopper's first attempt at this style that he would go on to perfect at Penrhyn Castle in Wales. Hopper was assisted by local architect Thomas Duff. In 1837 the building was reported as unfinished, and was not fully complete until 1859 when Hopper's assistant George Adam Burn rebuilt the entrance front.

Archibald Acheson, 4th Earl of Gosford (1841–1922) was forced to sell the castle's contents in 1920 and, after his death in April 1922, the castle was no longer occupied by the Acheson family. During the Second World War, Gosford was commandeered and used to accommodate troops, with a prisoner-of-war camp on the estate. Following the war the Achesons sold the estate to the Ministry of Agriculture, who established the 240 hectares (590 acres) demesne as Gosford Forest Park. The castle was used for the storage of public records, and in the 1970s served as a barracks for soldiers. In 1983, it was opened as a hotel, but the venture was unsuccessful, and the leaseholders allowed the building to fall into disrepair.

=== Redevelopment ===
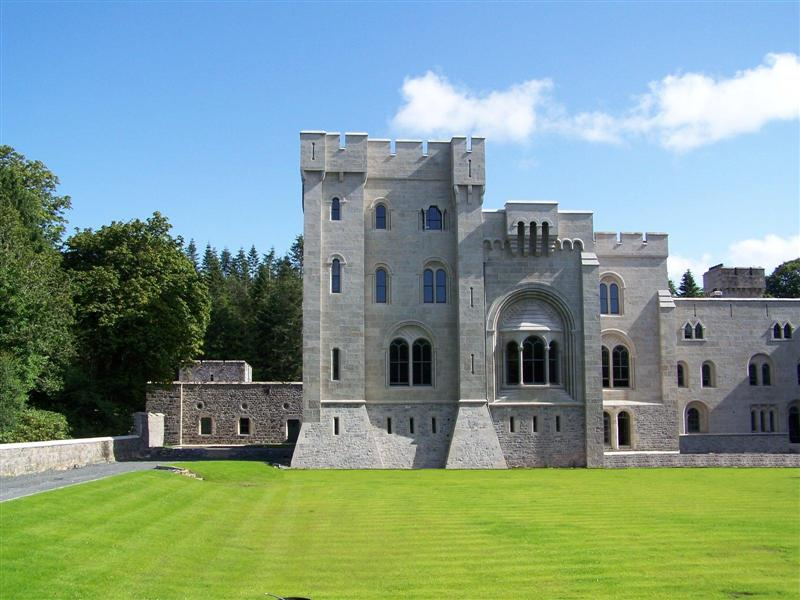
South front of the castle

The Forest Service, then part of the Department of Agriculture and Rural Development (DARD), regained control of the property in February 2002. The castle at this time was in a desperate state of disrepair and without urgent intervention was in real danger of becoming irretrievably beyond repair, leading to calls for action from the Ulster Architectural Heritage Society (UAHS). The castle, with 11 hectares (27 acres) of grounds, was put up for sale for as little as £1, subject to viable proposals for restoration. In 2006, the decaying castle was bought by Gosford Castle Development Ltd. for £1,000. The developers, supported by architects the Boyd Partnership and the Environment and Heritage Service, put forward a £4m proposal to restore the castle as 23 residences, based on vertical division of the building and retention of the main rooms. In January 2008 the first residents of the new apartments moved in. In 2013, it was reported that the redevelopment had been stalled since 2010 due to financial issues.

The restoration was undertaken by a team of artisans and craftsmen, to create homes of two, three and four storeys in height set within the original fabric of the castle. The development aimed to retain the character and historic integrity of the castle by using existing staircases and walls where possible. Approaches used include the restoration of original colour schemes in the principal rooms, such as the vaulted ceiling of the Inner Hall; walls that were painted green to represent drapery; and a background of scarlet used to set off the library's wooden bookcases. Residents began moving into the first completed homes in the castle courtyard in January 2008.

The castle was used as a filming location (for Riverrun, the seat of House Tully) in Game of Thrones. It was sold in 2019 with plans to convert it to apartments.

== See also ==
- Castles in Northern Ireland
