= Gortarowey Forest Recreation Area =

Coordinates: 54.3639°N 8.4985°W

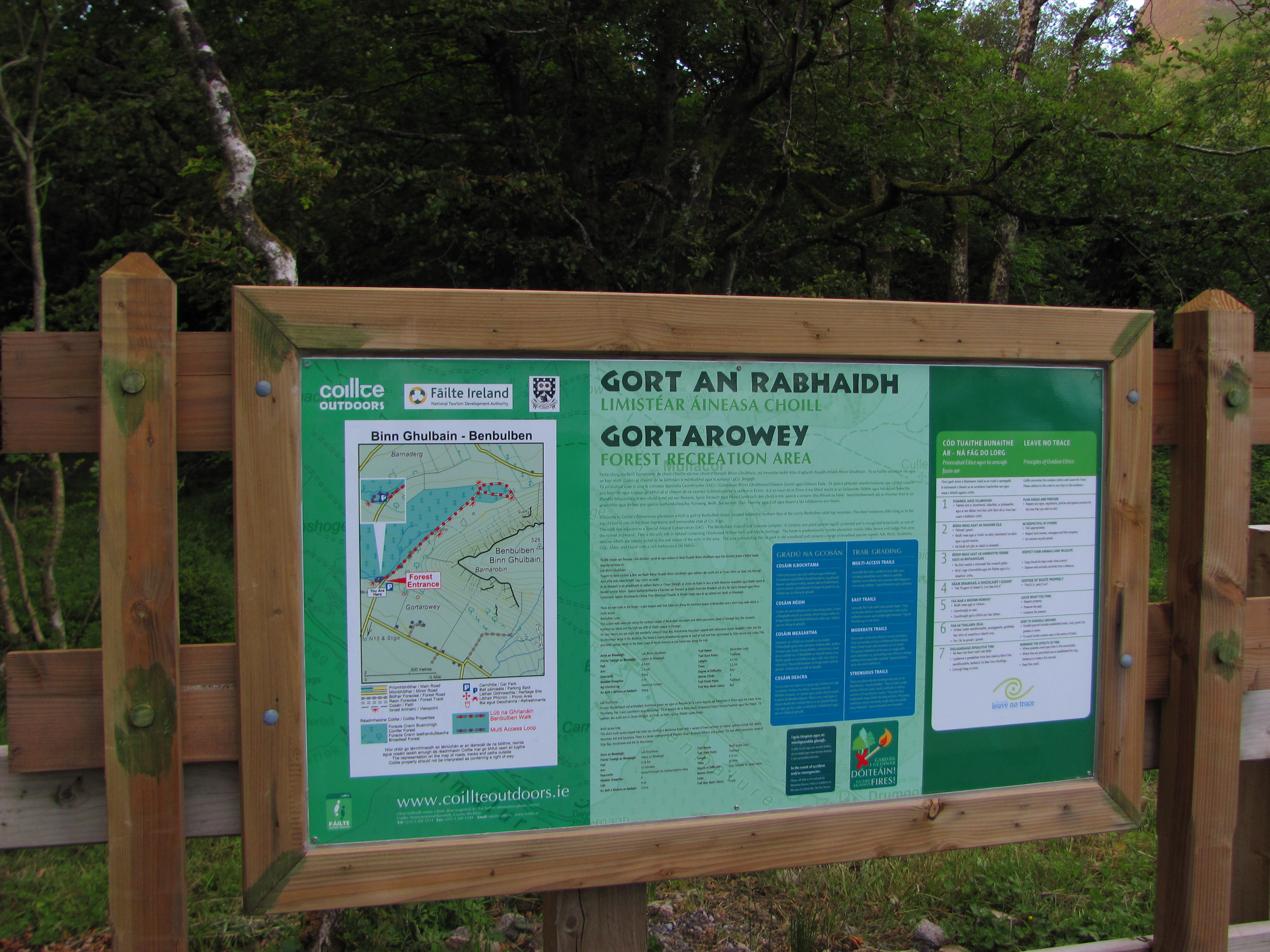
Information sign at the entrance to Gortarowey Forest Recreation Area

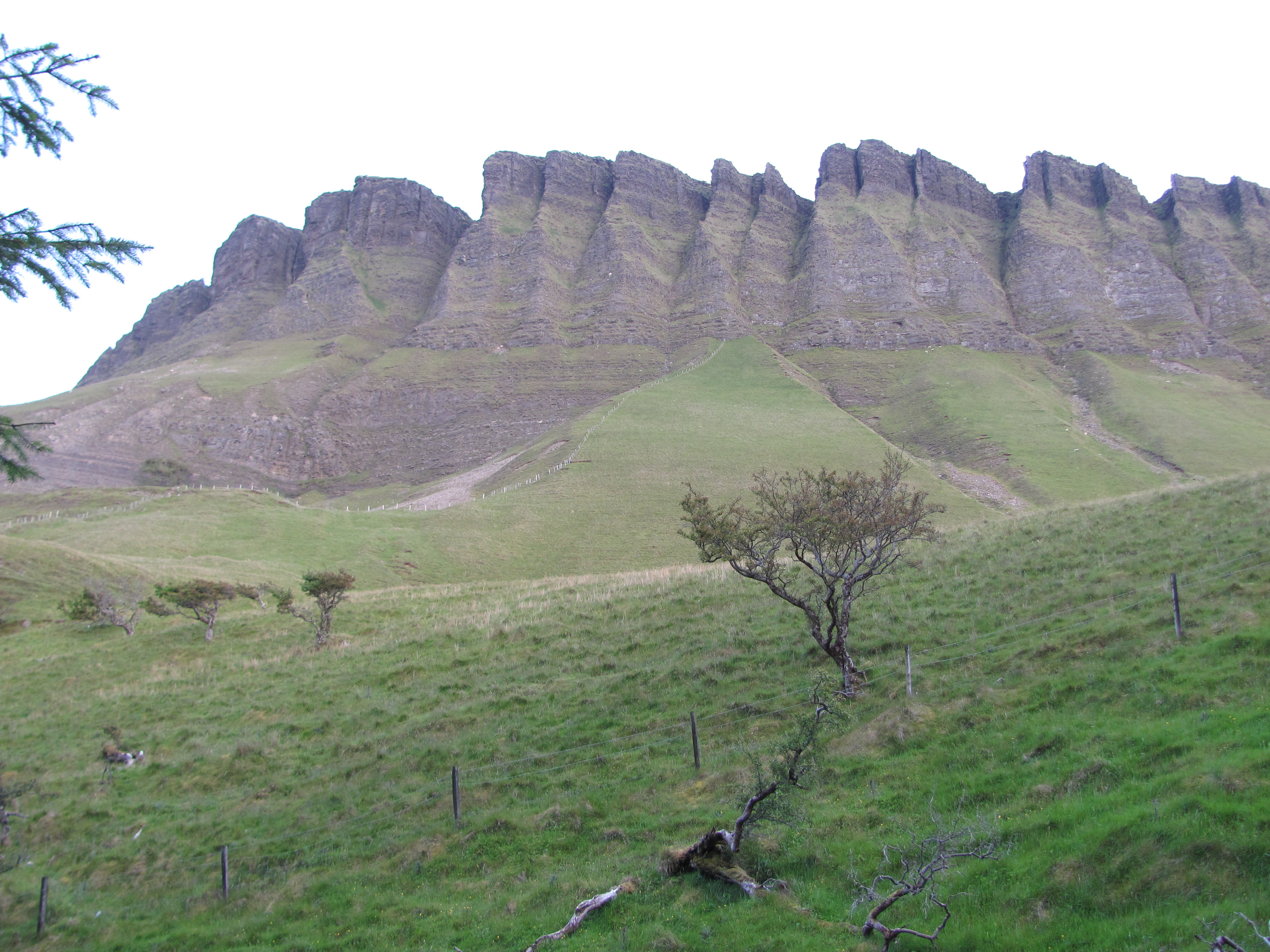
A view of the north-west face of Ben Bulben, as seen from the trail through the park.

Gortarowey Forest Recreation Area (Irish: Limistéar Áineasa Foraoise Ghort an Rabhaidh) is a forest park and recreation area at the foot of Ben Bulben near Drumcliffe in County Sligo, Ireland. The park is currently managed by Coillte, Ireland's commercial forestry company, as part of the larger Benbulben Forest. The park lies adjacent to the Benbulben, Gleniff and Glenade Special Area of Conservation and is known as the only area in Ireland where chickweed willowherb (Epilobium alsinifolium) and alpine saxifrage (Micranthes nivalis) can be found.
