= Caldermac Studios (Lisburn) =

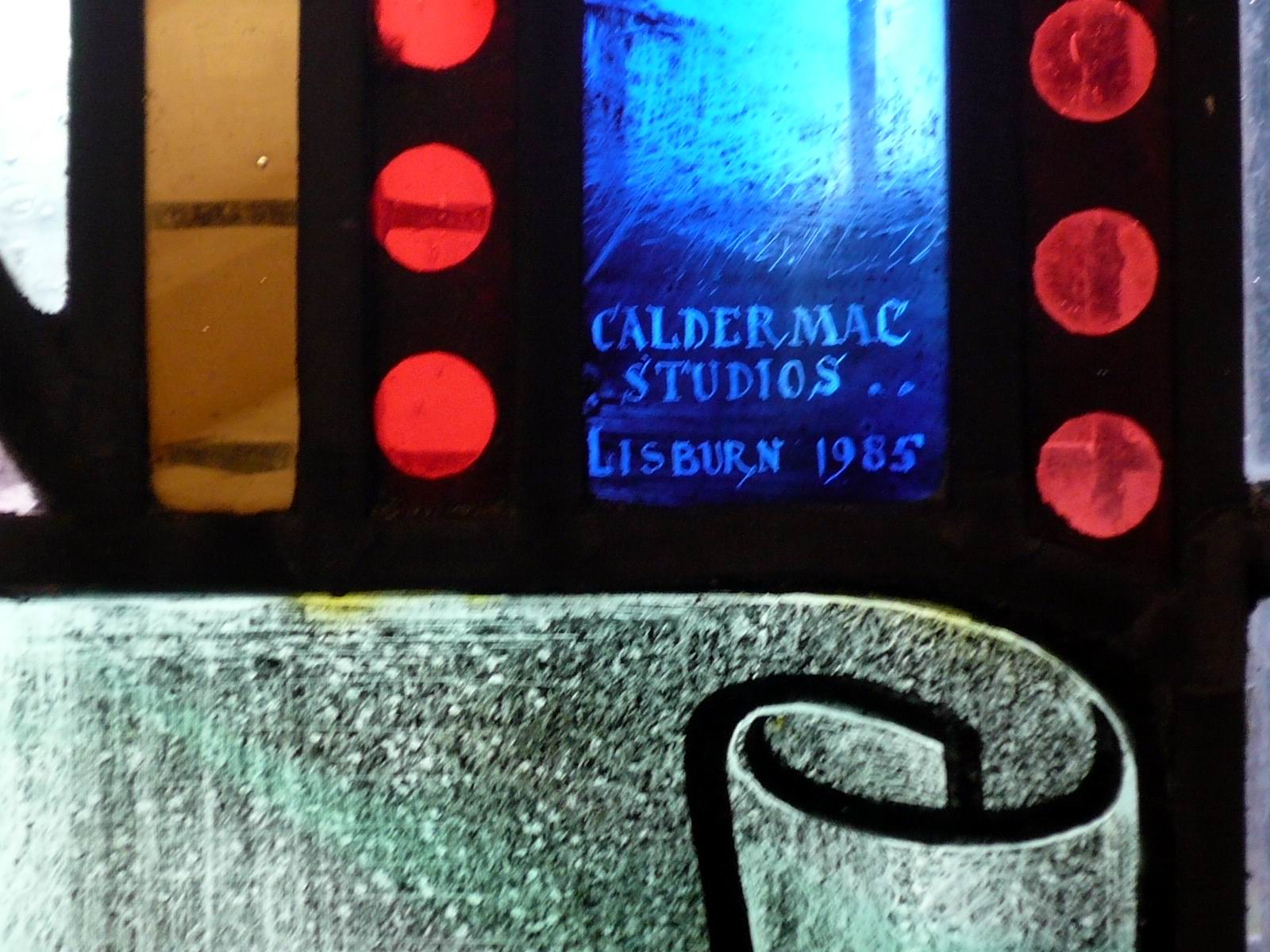
Makers' mark of Caldermac Studios from 1985

Caldermac Studios is a stained glass manufacturer in Lisburn, County Antrim responsible for most of the late-20th century- and early-21st-century-ecclesiastical stained glass. It is the preeminent Northern Irish stained glass manufacturer of church glass.

== Works ==
- “Good Shepherd” memorial window (1979) to Mary Tipping of Bellevue, Strabane Road, with Caldermac Studios maker’s mark, first stained glass window on the left side of the north nave wall in St. Eugene's Church of Ireland Church (Ardstraw Parish Church) (1724), Newtownstewart, County Tyrone, Northern Ireland BT78 4AA
