= Florence Court =

Historic house in Northern Ireland

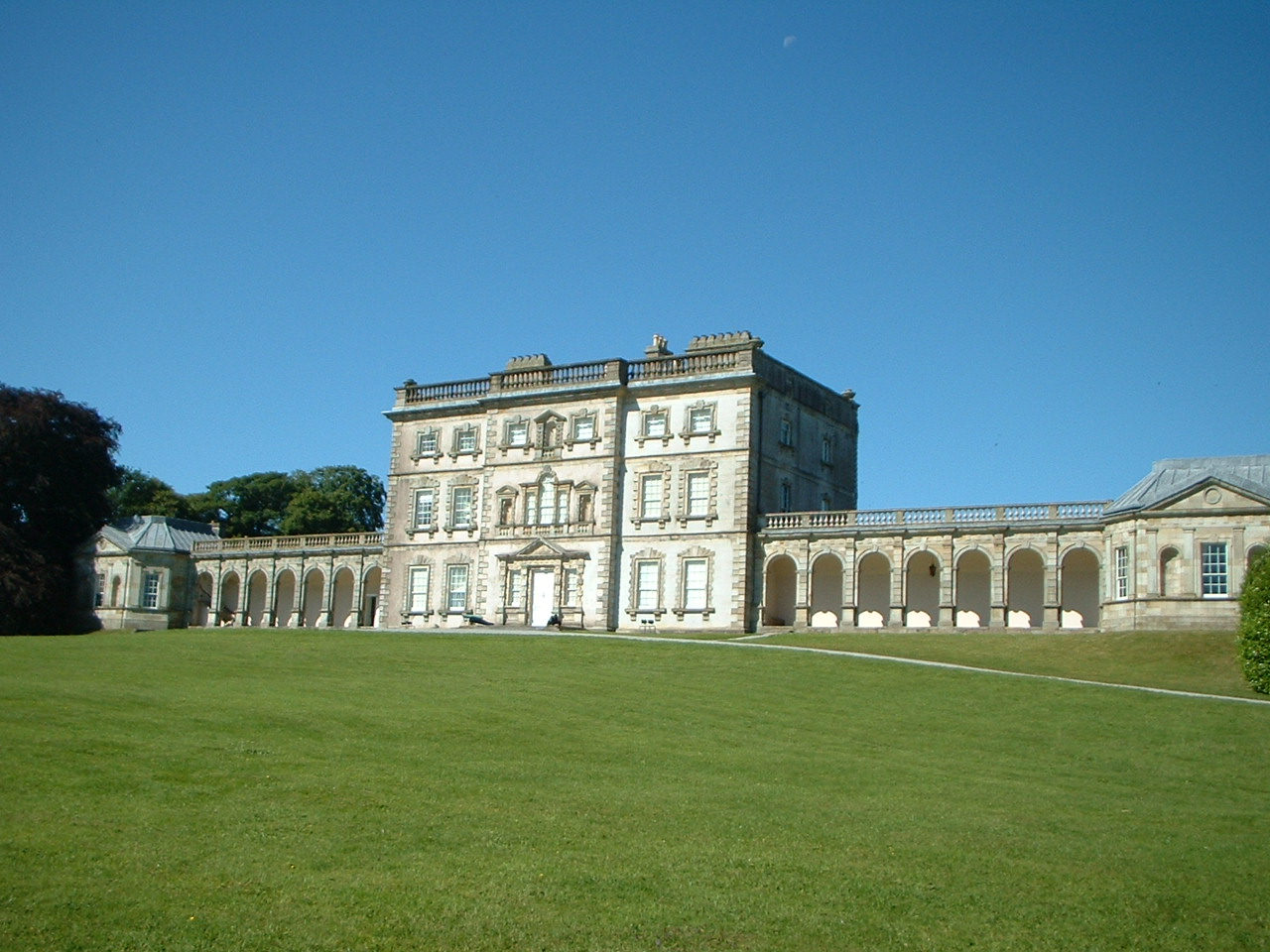
- Florence Court in 2006

- Location of Florence Court in Northern Ireland
- 54.261004°N 7.727313°W

Site notes
- Architect: Richard Cassels
- Owner: National Trust

Listed Building – Grade A
- Designated: 6 November 1981
- Reference no.: HB12/09/002

Florence Court is a large 18th-century house and estate located eight miles (13 km) south-west of Enniskillen, County Fermanagh, Northern Ireland. It is set in the foothills of Cuilcagh Mountain. The nearby village is distinguished by the one-word name Florencecourt. It is owned and managed by the National Trust and is the sister property of nearby Castle Coole. The other National Trust property in County Fermanagh is the Crom Estate.

== History ==
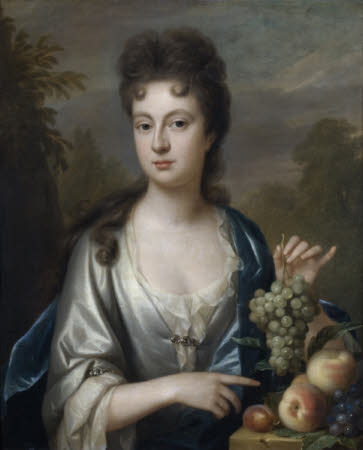
Florence Wrey (died 1718), daughter of Sir Bourchier Wrey, 4th Baronet (c. 1653–1696) by his wife Florence Rolle. She was the wife of John Cole of Enniskillen, builder of Florence Court, County Fermanagh, Northern Ireland. Her grandmother was one of the earliest English women to bear the name, Florence Rolle (1630–1705), the daughter and heiress of Denys Rolle (1614–1638), of Stevenstone and Bicton in Devon. Collection of National Trust, Florence Court

The history of the building of Florence Court is subject to conjecture and the current house was built in at least two, if not three, phases. The first house on the site was built by John Cole (1680–1726) and named after his wife Florence Bourchier Wrey (died 1718). She was the daughter of Sir Bourchier Wrey, 4th Baronet (c. 1653–1696) of Tawstock, Devon. An anonymous history of Fermanagh written in 1718 describes John Cole's house as being 'very costly and sumptuous' but in 1739 Rev. William Henry described this building as being 'but small, being only the left wing of a grand building, designed by Mr Cole, which he did not live to execute'.

The architects of the current house are unknown. The central block was built first and various dates from 1730 to 1764 are proffered for its construction. It has been attributed to the German architect Richard Cassels (or Castle) who worked at nearby Castle Hulme in 1728-9 and Florence Court shares similarities with some of Cassels' other Irish houses. An estate map of 1768 shows the central block, standing alone, as having a heavily framed oculus window (in place of the current pair of windows and large, squat niche) on the second floor. This was a recurring device in Cassels' work. Were Cassels involved, dating the initial phase of building to 1730 may be plausible. On the other hand, Mr Henry's account nine years later does not mention there being a new house, lately built. Rowan suggests the plans could have been drawn up by Cassels, but not executed until a much later date, pointing to the 'old fashioned' style of the house; and reflects that 'the design, for all its charm, is far too gauche for [Cassels]'.

The baroque plasterwork in the library and study at the front of the house appear to date from an earlier period to the rich rococo plasterwork in the dining room, drawing room and stair hall on the western side of the house, and the floorboards in these two rooms differ in width from those elsewhere in the house. It is conjectured that the central block may have been completed in two phases, with the rooms at the back of the house, along with the Venetian room, finished by 1764, when John Cole's son, Lord Mount Florence, held a famous housewarming party.

The colonnades and pavilions were built c. 1771 and are attributed to the Italian engineer and architect Davis Ducart. These are built of dressed sandstone as opposed to the rendered limestone rubble of the central block. The south and stable yards are by the mason Andrew Lambert. The Introduction to the Enniskillen Papers proposes there may have been an addition stage to completing the front we know today, pointing out that the heavily rusticated window dressings may have been 'an afterthought by another, less accomplished hand'. They do not feature on the facade shown on the 1768 estate map; the introduction suggests further work may have been 'a vain attempt to harmonise [the central block] with the sophisticated cut-stone of the links and pavilions'.

Whether there was a final phase is a matter of conjecture. The 1979 National Trust guidebook points out the similarity between the unusual pedimented doorcase at Florence Court with the doorcase of the now ruinous Nixon Hall at nearby Gransha (built c. 1780). Major improvements were made on the estate c. 1778–80. These included the landscaping of the park by William King and his laying out of the new drive, and the building of the Grand Gates.

Florence Court was the seat of the Earls of Enniskillen until 1973. John Henry Michael Cole, 5th Earl of Enniskillen transferred the house and fourteen acres surrounding it to the National Trust in 1953. In 1955 a devastating fire destroyed the upper floors of the house. Sir Albert Richardson was entrusted with leading the National Trust's restoration and extensive efforts have since returned Florence Court to much of its former glory. Some rooms on the upper floors, however, remain closed.

== Description ==
The house features exquisite Rococo decoration. It also features fine Irish furniture, many pieces of which were acquired for the property by the National Trust and others loaned from other Irish houses. The majority of the original furnishings were removed when the Cole family moved to Perthshire in 1973 but many were returned at the bequest of Nancy Cole, Dowager Countess of Enniskillen on her death in 1998.

== Gardens ==
=== Pleasure Garden ===
The expansive pleasure garden was landscaped in the mid-19th century, with panoramic views of Benaughlin and Cuilcagh mountains. It features Victorian specimen trees and displays of both temperate and semi-tropical plants, principally rhododendrons.

=== Summer House ===
Also known as the heather house. The present structure is a reconstruction of an 18th-century thatched summer house. It is located on a prominent spot at the top of the pleasure garden, with views of the garden and Benaughlin mountain.

The structure was rebuilt by the National Trust in the late-1980s to designs based on 19th-century photographs of the feature. The foundation and cobbled floor are the only parts of the 18th-century structure that remain. In 2015 the summer house was burnt to the ground by vandals. It was rebuilt in 2016, with a significant proportion of the funding for the project raised from the local community.

=== Florence Court Yew ===
The most notable tree on the estate is the Florence Court Yew. This specimen is survivor of the two original Irish Yew (Taxus baccata 'fastigiata') saplings discovered in 1767 by local farmer George Willis on Cuilcagh mountain. As the Irish Yew can be propagated only from cuttings, this tree is the progenitor of almost all Irish Yews worldwide.

The yew is located within the site of the John Cole's early 18th-century gardens, approximately one mile southeast of the house. These formerly extensive gardens are now largely lost with the exception of the surviving remains of the 18th-century rock garden, located opposite the yew. The rock garden formerly contained stone tables and chairs but is currently overgrown.

=== Walled Garden ===
The four acre walled garden was laid out in the 18th century and extended in the 1870s by Charlotte, Countess of Enniskillen. It features a rose garden, two ponds, orchards of heirloom variety fruit trees and a working vegetable garden. The 1870s Rose Cottage on the western edge of the garden was formerly the head gardener's dwelling. It was restored from a derelict condition in the 1990s and is now let as a holiday cottage. In September 2017 a National Trust project to restore the garden to its 1930s condition was awarded a grant by the Heritage Lottery Fund. The project includes plans to rebuild two long glass houses that formerly ran along the length of the north wall.

The tennis courts behind the north wall were replaced by Forestry Service offices in the 1970s.

=== Cane Cottage ===
An 18th-century cottage built from bamboo was formerly located west of the house. It served as a tea house but fell into disrepair during the second half of the 20th century and was demolished in the 1970s.

=== Lady Well ===
The Lady Well is a natural spring well located approximately three quarters of a mile east of the house at the bottom of the Broad Meadow.

== Park ==
=== Landscape ===
The 18th-century landscaped park is framed by Benauglin and Cuilcagh mountains. It was laid out c. 1778–80 by William King for William Cole, 1st Earl of Enniskillen. King's work included the present undulating main drive, replacing the earlier straight east avenue which ran from the centre of the main front of the house. The path of the original drive remains visible on aerial photographs.

The Larganess and Finglass rivers flow through the estate, most of which is occupied by pasture and forestry, principally Larch. The Glen Wood nature reserve is a semi-natural oak woodland conserved by the Forestry Service near to the old deer park on the southwest edge of the demesne.

=== Gate lodges ===
The Grand Gates date from c. 1778. They are flanked by a pair of symmetrical bay fronted lodges with hipped roofs facing the road and gables to the rear. Each comprises a single room. The current double sash windows were installed in the 1920s, replacing the original square Georgian glazing. The original chimney stacks have been demolished and the walls of the lodges, which were originally harled, are now rendered and painted. For many years the gates were painted red but are now black.

The south lodge is a picturesque one and a half story cottage built to replace an earlier lodge in the 1870s. The cottage is three bays wide with a front gabled porch, built from coursed rubble with dressed sandstone door and window surrounds. Quatrefoil bargeboards decorate the porch and side gables. The original sash windows have been replaced by simple modern glazing.

The Old Gate lodge at the end of the north avenue was built c. 1800. It was originally a single story three bay cottage, later extended to its present T plan.

== Rural industry and engineering ==
=== Sawmill ===
A working water-powered sawmill stands on the edge of the pleasure garden. It includes an exhibition on the history of the building, the timber industry on the estate and the mid-1980s restoration of the building and machinery. The water wheel has the name 'William Maxwell circa 1848' at its centre although who Maxwell was is obscure. The machinery includes the original mid-19th century water-powered saw and two early-20th century electrical saws. Behind the mill is the millpond and the rebuilt millrace. The headrace runs off the Larganess river and is approximately one and a half miles long.

The main part of the building is built of limestone rubble and dates to the 18th century. It was extended and converted to a sawmill in the 1840s. A brick extension housing an office was added later in the 19th century. The building's original use is unknown although several long vertical apertures along each side of the building have the appearance of gun loops and may indicate the building had an earlier military function, possibly as a barracks.

=== Carpenter's workshop and cottage ===
In the vicinity of the sawmill are a restored carpenter's workshop and cottage. Items including wheels, furniture and coffins were made here for both the estate and the local area.

=== Hydraulic Ram ===
Near to the sawmill is a working Victorian hydraulic ram. It uses water pressure from the millpond to generate enough force to pump water uphill to the house. The hydraulic ram was replaced as the house's water supply following connection to mains water in the 1950s and now pumps into the millrace.

=== Eel house bridge ===
The Eel house is a single-arched 18th-century bridge crossing the Larganess river, located at the southwest corner of the pleasure garden. The bridge passes close to two small fords which slow the river at this point. Eel was formerly abundant in the Larganess and traps were set across the river here as it was an optimal place to catch them. The resulting catch was stored in the room behind the opening to the left of the arch.

=== Forge ===
Behind the cattle yard is a preserved 18th century forge still used occasionally for demonstrations.

=== Tilery ===
In the 1850s William Cole, 3rd Earl of Enniskillen set up Florencecourt Tilery to provide local employment, utilising rich clay deposits in the vicinity of the Arney River. The works were located approximately two miles northeast of the estate and remained open until the deposits were worked out in the early 20th century. The principal items manufactured were bricks, water pipes, roof tiles and hollow insulated floor tiles, similar to Roman hypocaust tiles. The floor tiles were commonly used in the kitchens of dwellings in surrounding areas, whilst the roof tiles appear to have been used only for outbuildings. The use of these materials is a distinctive feature of the vernacular architecture of southwest Fermanagh, otherwise rare and possibly unique in Irish vernacular architecture of the period.

== The fire ==
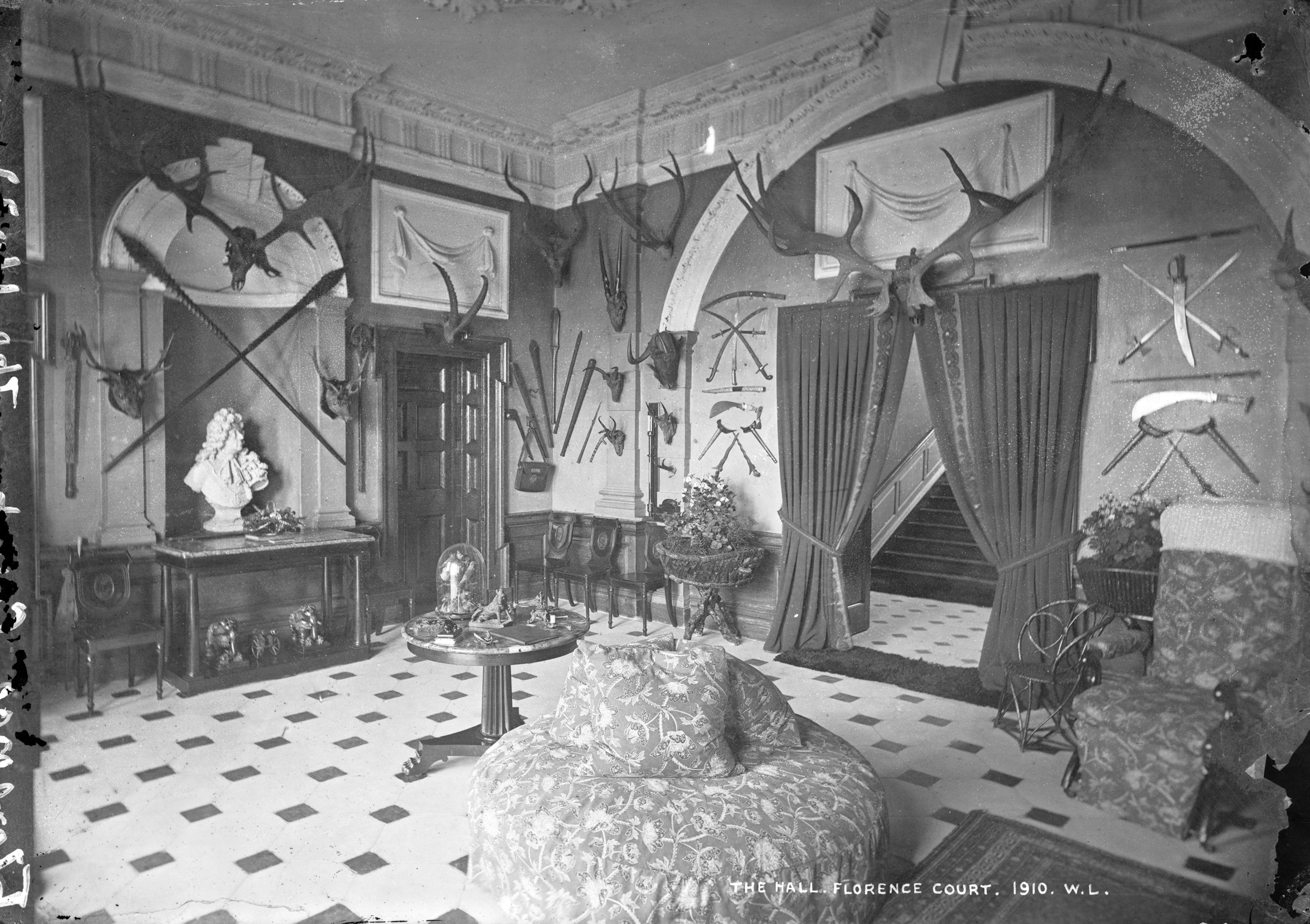
The Hall at Florence Court, c. 1890s

Early on the morning of 22 March 1955, a fire broke out on the first floor landing at Florence Court, adjacent to Lady Enniskillen's bedroom. Whilst fire brigades almost had control of the fire by 9am, dry weather conditions helped re-ignite the blaze. Flames reached the roof of the building which crashed down into the hall, so that by the evening around two-thirds of the Florence Court interior lay in ruins.

Lady Enniskillen, born Mary Cicely Nevill (daughter of Hugh Nevill), discovered the fire, which broke out during one of her husband's rare absences from home. After rushing downstairs to the servant's quarters to raise the alarm, she went to nearby Killymanamly House to telephone the elderly 5th Earl of Enniskillen (1876–1963), who was at the Ulster Club in Belfast, to tell him that the house was on fire. He is said to have cried "What the hell do you think I can do about it?".

Much of the damage to the interior of Florence Court was caused by the gallons of water pumped onto the flames. The dining room, with its exquisite plasterwork decoration, was saved only by the prompt action of local builders Bertie Pierce and Ned Vaughan who, on the instructions of Viola Grosvenor, later the Duchess of Westminster, drilled six holes in the flat part of the ceiling to allow the water which had accumulated on the floor above to quickly drain away and thereby preventing ceiling collapse. Two of these holes are still evident in the dining room today.

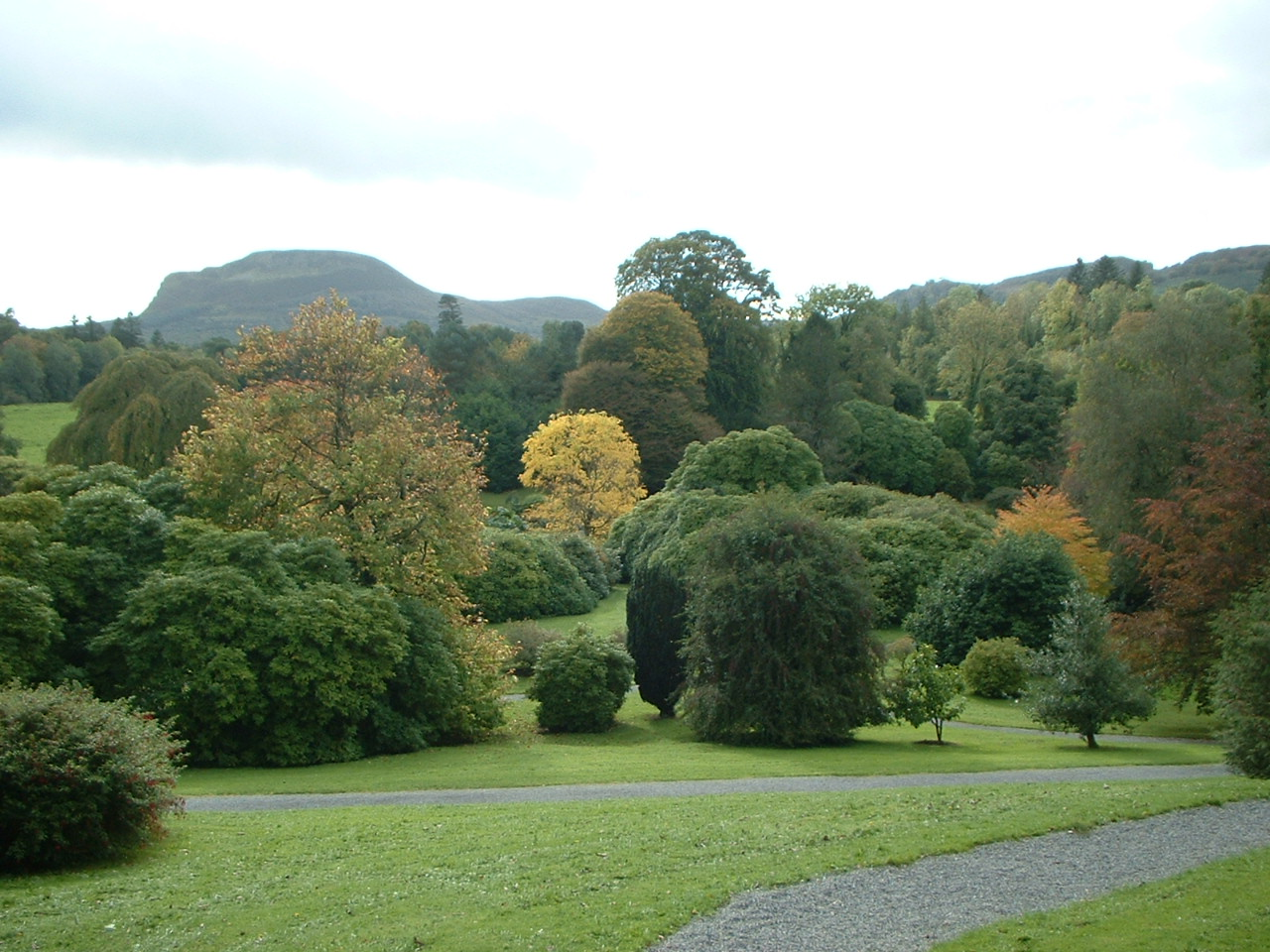
Florence Court estate in early autumn; nestled in the foothills of Cuilcagh Mountain

The fire was only one of a series of events in the 1950s and 60s at Florence Court which marked the end of an era for the house and family. Following World War II falling agricultural prices, rising wage costs, death duties and a drastic reduction of the size of the demesne, the lifestyle of the 5th Earl of Enniskillen and his second wife Mary (née Nevill), was increasingly difficult to sustain. To secure the long-term future of the house, Lord Enniskillen gave Florence Court to the National Trust in 1953. It was opened to the public the following year.

In 1956, the 5th Earl's only son and heir Michael, Viscount Cole, died suddenly aged 36; he was unmarried. In 1961, as the restoration of the house was nearing completion, Hurricane Debbie devastated the estate. In 1963, the 5th Earl and his wife, Lady Enniskillen, died within three months of each other.

The 5th Earl, upon his death, was succeeded by his nephew, Captain David Lowry Cole, (1918–1989), in 1963, who became the 6th Earl of Enniskillen. David Enniskillen (as he was popularly known) had spent much of his life in the Colony of Kenya, having been elected a member of the Legislative Council of Kenya in the early 1960s, just before independence. In 1955, he was divorced from his first wife Sonia (née Syers), stepdaughter of his uncle the 5th Earl (who died in 1963 with his wife, Sonia's mother). By her, he had issue: one son and one daughter.

David Enniskillen and his second wife, Nancy, Countess of Enniskillen (née Nancy MacLennan; formerly a diplomat with the United States Foreign Service), moved back to Florence Court, living there from 1964 until 1973. In that year, in the early years of The Troubles, the Earl and Countess of Enniskillen left Florence Court, moving over to Kinloch House in Kinloch, Perthshire, in Britain. David Enniskillen thus became the last Earl of Enniskillen to actually live in Florence Court. He was succeeded by his only son Andrew Cole, 7th Earl of Enniskillen, in 1989. Andrew Enniskillen continues to live on an estate in Kenya.

== Film and television ==
During the spring of 2012, the BBC filmed parts of Blandings, a television comedy, at Florence Court. Most of the series, however, was filmed at Crom Castle. The series was first broadcast on BBC 1 during January and February 2013.

== See also ==
- Florence Court Forest Park
