= Benaughlin Mountain =

Mountain in County Fermanagh, Northern Ireland

Benaughlin
- Binn Eachlainn
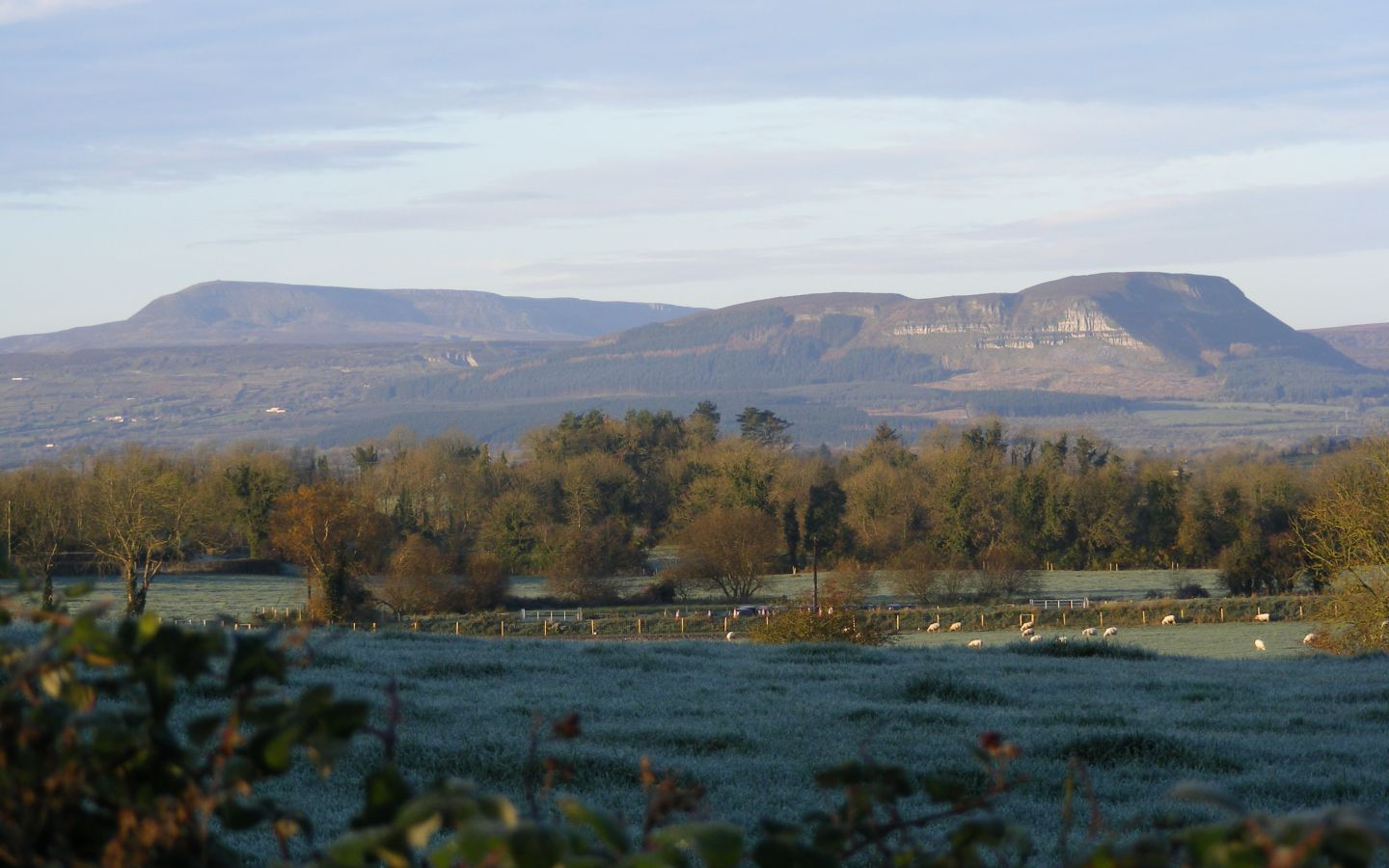
- Benaughlin Mountain viewed from South Fermanagh in November 2007. (Cuilcagh can be seen on the upper left.)

Highest point
- Elevation: 370 m (1,210 ft)
- Prominence: 124 m (407 ft)

Geography
- Location: County Fermanagh, Northern Ireland
- Parent range: Cuilcagh Mountains
- OSI/OSNI grid: H178315
- Topo map: OSi Discovery 26

Benaughlin Mountain, or simply Benaughlin (from Irish Binn Eachlainn), is a large hill in the Cuilcagh Mountain range in County Fermanagh, Northern Ireland. It rises to 373 metres (1,224 ft) above sea level and is mainly composed of sandstone, limestone and shale. A section of the Ulster Way formerly passed around the side of Benaughlin, within 300 m of the summit until it was revised in 2009 and now instead ascends from Florencecourt.

The hill was originally called Binn Eachlabhra, which is thought to mean "peak of the speaking horse". Locals would climb the hill on the last Sunday of July for the festival of Lughnasa, and folklore tells of a large white horse (An Chopail Bán) which would appear on the hill each year and speak to them. Benaughlin is also associated with Donn na Binne ("Donn of the peak"), the legendary ancestor of the Mag Uidhir (Maguire) chiefs of Fermanagh and a king of the Sí. He is said to dwell in the mountain, and it was believed that whenever any of his real descendants die, a shard falls off its rocky face.

Benaughlin is also known as Bin Mountain to local residents.

The blanket bog which covers Benaughlin was used as a source of fuel for the wealthy landowners in the area who lived in the nearby stately home of Florence Court. A path known as the Donkey Trail meanders up the side of the mountain; this was the route used for bringing the turf down off the mountain side.

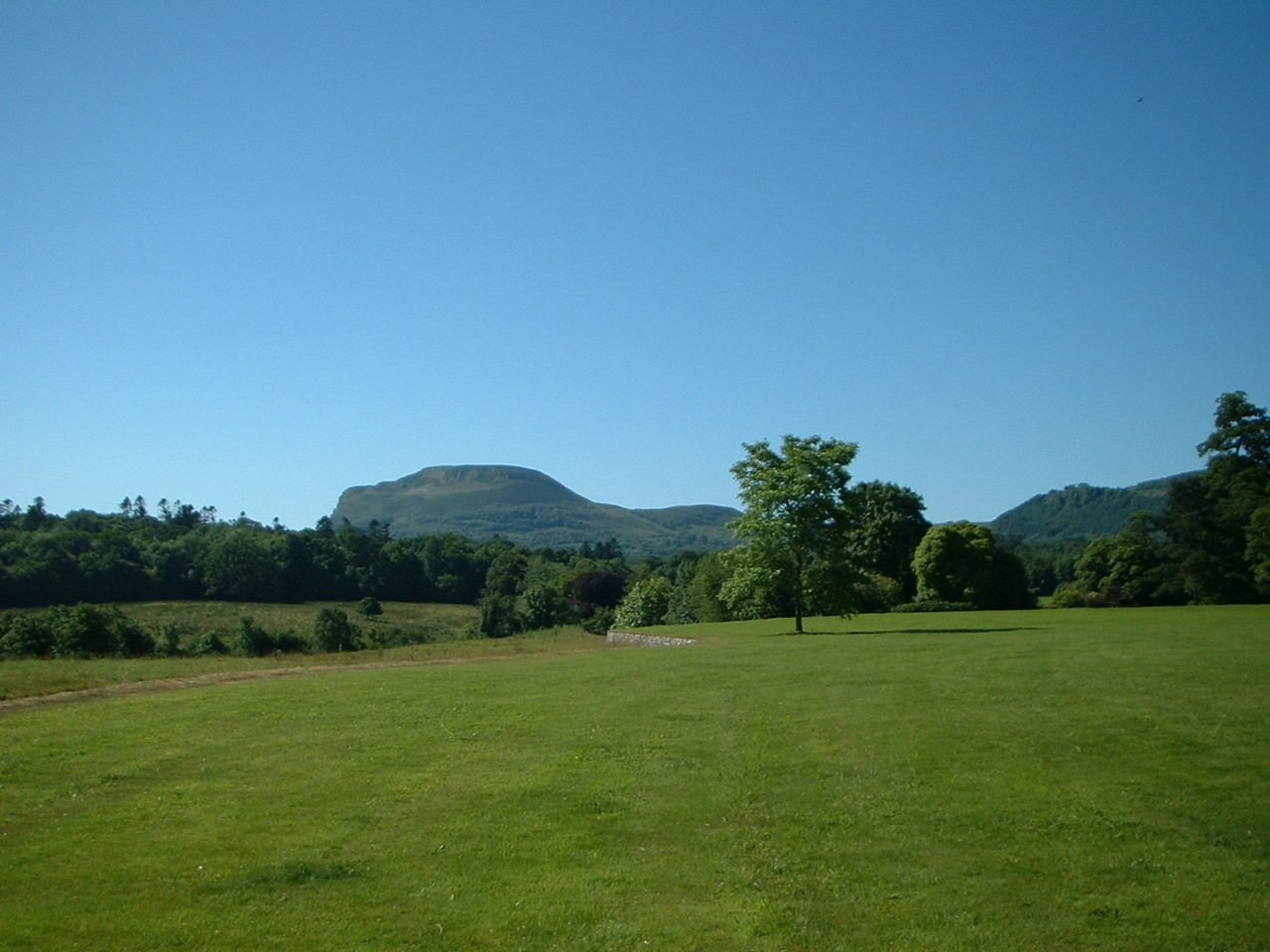
Benaughlin viewed from the Florence Court estate in mid-summer

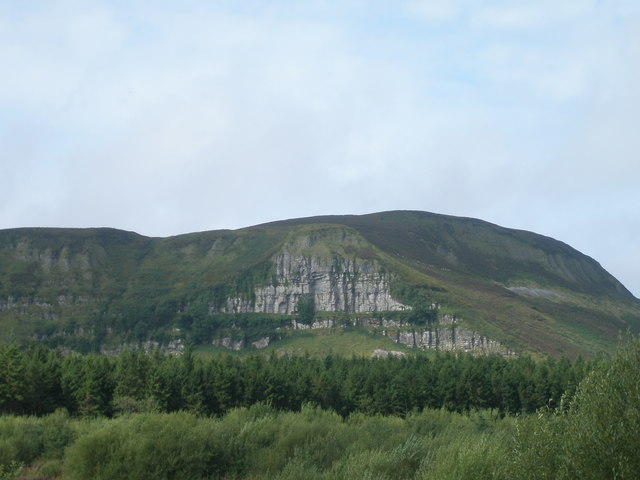
Benaughlin cliff face

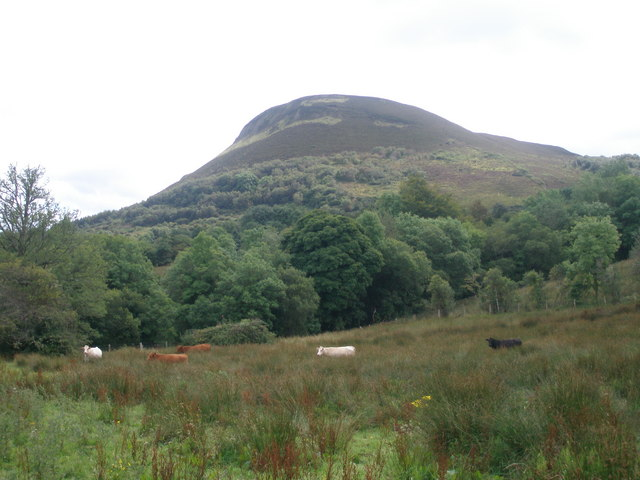
Benaughlin summit

== See also ==
- List of Marilyns in Northern Ireland
