= Gosford Forest Park =

Park in the United Kingdom

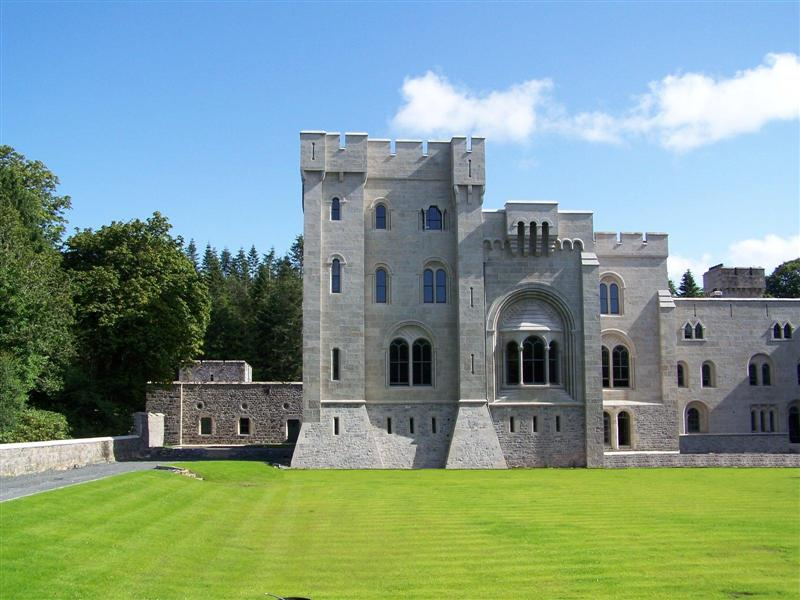
- Gosford Castle

- Location within Northern Ireland
- Type: Public forest park
- Location: Markethill, County Armagh, Northern Ireland
- Nearest city: Armagh
- Coordinates: 54°18′09″N 6°31′20″W
- Area: c. 240 Hectares
- Created: 1958
- Operator: Armagh City, Banbridge and Craigavon Borough Council
- Open: Daily (year-round)

Gosford Forest Park is a forest park located outside Markethill, County Armagh, Northern Ireland. The park, previously Gosford Demesne, was acquired by the Department of Agriculture in 1958 and comprises some 240 hectares of diverse woodland and open parkland. Gosford Forest Park is also home to Gosford Castle. It was designated the first conservation forest in Northern Ireland in 1986.

== History ==
In the early 17th century, the Acheson family came to the Markethill area, and built a substantial farmhouse near what is now the town of Markethill. The family came from Monmouthshire and the present Earl of Weymes is related to the Achesons who later became the Earls of Gosford. When they came to the area first, they brought with them 13 families, and some of the family names still survive in the area, including Galbraith and Greer. One of the two forts (or raths) in Gosford Forest was named after the Greer family who farmed the land in that area.

The first dwelling place of the Achesons was burned down; this house was near the town of Markethill which the family were responsible for founding. In 1610, the family were granted the lands of the present estate. They proceeded to build another house using locally procured, hand-made, red brick. This house was named Clonkearney Manor after the townland in which it was built. The path to this site is up near the ponds, but only a portion of the red brick foundations is now visible. This house was burned down during the 1641 Irish Rebellion.

The estate is now owned by the Forest Service and has a number of visitor facilities and a café. It also houses one of Northern Ireland's largest collections of rare breeds.

Gosford Castle was renovated into 23 new homes.

In 1989, Gosford Forest Park hosted the Irish Scout Jamboree, "Gosford '89", which was attended by over 3,000 scouts from around the world, including contingents from Canada, Japan and the United States.

== Facilities ==
Facilities in the park include a camping and caravanning site as well as picnic and barbecue areas. There are way-marked walking trails in the park and also horse-riding and orienteering routes.
