= Florence Court Forest Park =

Forest park in Northern Ireland

Coordinates: 54°15′17″N 7°44′04″W

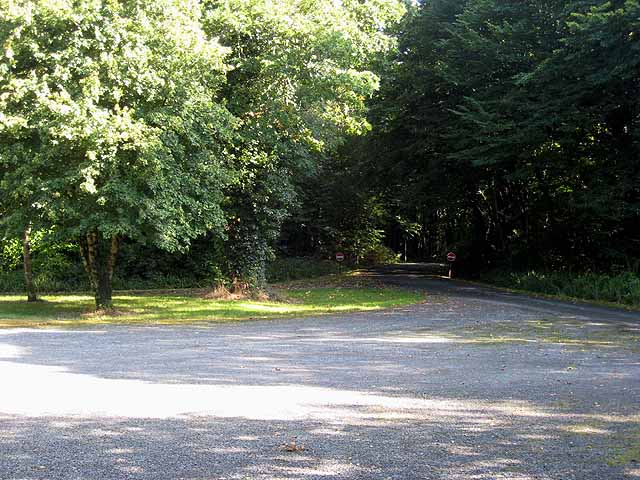
Car park at Florence Court

Florence Court Forest Park is a forest park in County Fermanagh, Northern Ireland. It has walking and cycling trails, as well as pony trekking. The park adjoins the Florence Court House, and the old estate woodlands have mature oak trees up to 200 years old.

== Size and location ==
The forest is located on the north east shoulder of Cuilcagh mountain and covers an area of 1,200 hectares. The forest adjoins the National Trust property and Florence Court House. The forest has facilities including a large car park, a visitor reception centre, and toilets. There are trails for walking and cycling. There is also pony trekking and a Touring in the Trees site. The forest park is managed by the National Trust, and entrance charges apply.

== Environment ==
The park contains blanket bog, coniferous forest and open mountain habitats. There are mature oaks in the old estate woodland, some of which are two hundred years old. There are views across County Fermanagh from the peaks.

== History ==
Florence Court is named after the wife of Sir John Cole, who first built a house on the site in the early 18th century. The present house with a view over Benaughlin Mountain is believed to have been built by his son John, afterwards the 1st Lord Mount Florence. The wings and pavilions were added to the mid-18th century block around 1770 by William Cole, 1st Earl of Enniskillen. In 1955 the main building was struck by fire. Quick thinking by rescuers, who drilled holes in the floor, saved the dining room ceiling, with its cherubs and birds. The rest of the house and the plasterwork after the manner of Robert West has been restored.
