= Short Drop Cave–Gavel Pot system =

Cave entrances in Lancashire, England

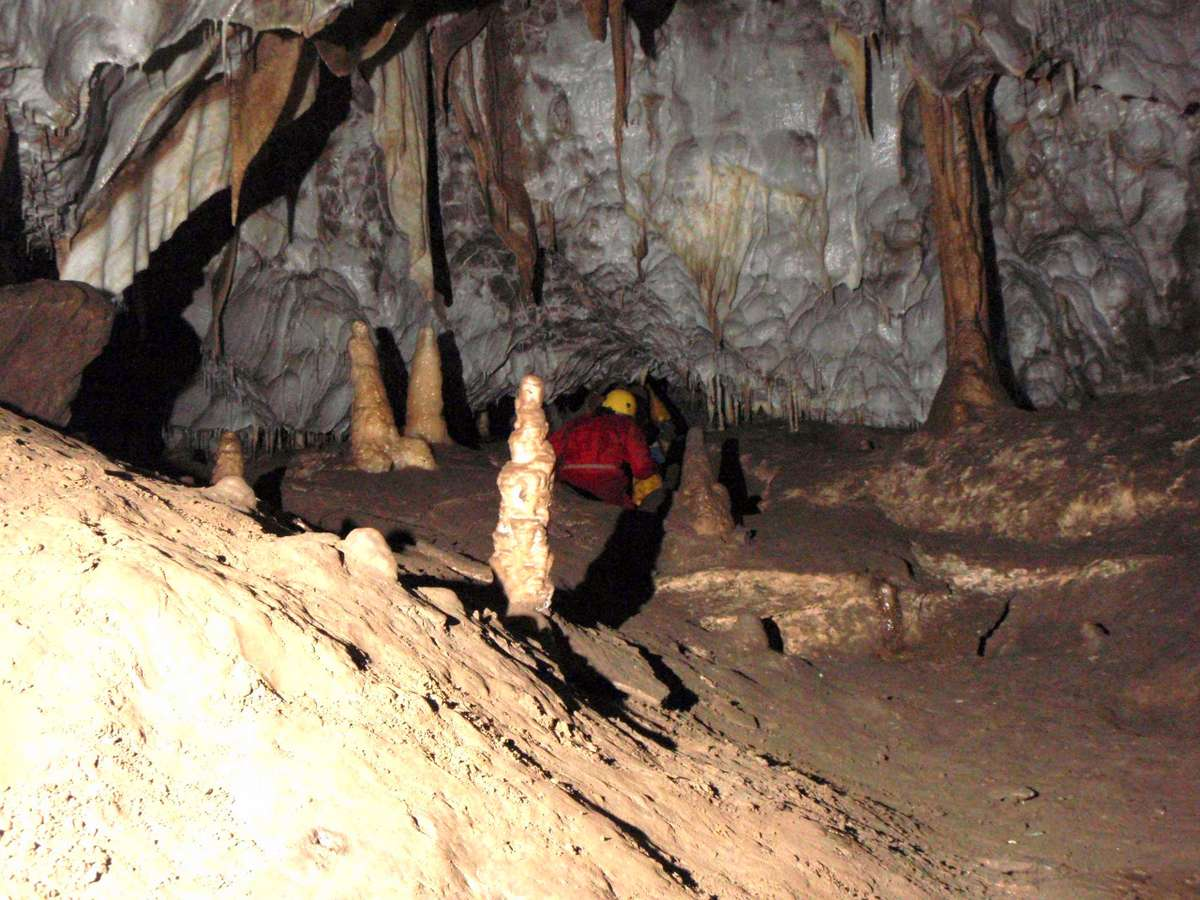
- Calcite formations in Glasfurd's Chamber

- Location within Yorkshire Dales
- Location: Leck Fell, Lancashire, England
- OS grid: SD 67026892
- Coordinates: 54°12′18″N 2°30′25″W
- Depth: 212 metres (696 ft)
- Length: about 4.68 kilometres (2.91 mi)
- Elevation: 323 metres (1,060 ft)
- Discovery: 1885
- Geology: Carboniferous limestone
- Entrances: 4
- Hazards: verticality, water
- Access: Unrestricted

Short Drop Cave and Gavel Pot are different entrances into the same cave system on Leck Fell, in Lancashire, England. The main top entrance, Short Drop Cave, is a small hole in a fenced-off shakehole near the main stream sink. Gavel Pot, a window into the system, is a large fenced shakehole some 40-metre (130 ft) deep, requiring tackle to descend. Two other smaller entrances also lead into Short Drop Cave. At its base, the system links via a sump with Lost Johns' Cave and is part of the Three Counties System, an 87 kilometres (54 mi) cave system that spans the borders of Cumbria, Lancashire, and North Yorkshire.

== Description ==
The main entrance into Short Cave is at the end of a shallow valley where a small hole drops into a stream passage. Upstream leads to a canal passage that becomes too tight, and an excavated squeeze on the right, before the end, leads to the Coal Hole entrance. Downstream, 100 metres (330 ft) of mainly low passage leads to an oxbow with a larger passage arriving from Rift Entrance. A long awkward inlet passage called Masochist Passage can be followed to the northeast for some 300 metres (980 ft) almost up to the Rumbling Hole stream sinks, and an old high level route named Ancient Highway loops back to the main route.

Downstream continues as a canyon passage that steadily enlarges, passing an inlet passage on the left. Here, the main water enters and can be followed to where it becomes choked with boulders under the stream sink. The main passage continues for about 300 metres (980 ft) up to 15 metres (49 ft) high and 5 metres (16 ft) wide, under a boulder bridge wedged across the passage, to finish in a choke in a roof chamber. The water then follows a narrow meandering canyon to the first waterfall pitch of 5 metres (16 ft), and continues to a second pitch of 8 metres (26 ft). At its base, the water disappears into a choked sump pool. A traverse can be followed over the top of the pitch round to where a pitch enters from the Gavel Pot doline.

The Rift Entrance (54.204478°N 2.506837°W) is a blocked entrance just over the wall from the main sink. A climb down enters a rift chamber, where a passage enters the First Oxbow in Short Drop Cave.

The Coal Hole Entrance (54.206118°N 2.504784°W) is in a small shakehole SE of Rumbling Hole. A long crawl eventually reaches a bedding chamber with a coal seam exposed in the walls. An excavated squeeze drops into Canals Inlet in Short Drop Cave.

The Gavel Pot (54.206146°N 2.513413°W) consists of a steep-sided shakehole some 40 metres (130 ft) deep, and 140 metres (460 ft) in circumference - reputedly the largest shakehole in England. Scrambling down the eastern side leads to a ledge where an 8 metres (26 ft) pitch lands at the end of the traverse from Short Drop Cave. In the other direction, a high canyon passage soon enters the bottom of the Gavel Pot shakehole, overlooked by rocky ramparts. In the corner, a further 8 metres (26 ft) pitch over a chockstone lands in a chamber where an excavated 10 metres (33 ft) drop lands in the main passage. The water from Short Drop soon enters from the right, and a large collapse from Ash Tree Hole on the surface is passed on the left. The passage develops into a canyon and drops down two well-watered shafts of 26 metres (85 ft) and 17 metres (56 ft). The final one lands in a chamber with a sump pool, which is a window into the underwater passages carrying water from Notts Pot to the resurgence at Leck Beck Head. Upstream has been dived for 120 metres (390 ft) to a shaft 60 metres (200 ft) deep. At the bottom, a descending passage chokes at a depth of 64 metres (210 ft), the deepest point in the Three Counties System. The main downstream has been dived past a junction at 198 metres (650 ft). Upstream here emerges at the downstream sump of Lost Johns' Cave after 15 metres (49 ft). Downstream has been dived for some 1.7 kilometres (5,600 ft), past an inlet from Pippikin Pot, to the resurgence, much of it at 30 metres (98 ft) depth.

A window in the upper part of the main passage leads into a series of well-decorated chambers called Glasfurd's Chamber.

The cave has been equipped with resin P-hangers allowing cavers to descend the cave using single rope techniques.

== Geology and hydrology ==
The cave is a solutional cave formed in Visean Great Scar limestone from the Mississippian Series of the Carboniferous period. The various abandoned passages in Short Drop Cave show that it has a long history, but the current drainage flows through the main passages of Short Drop Cave and Gavel Pot to join the main Ireby Fell Cavern–Notts Pot water at the base of the cave, where it flows through to its resurgence at Leck Beck Head. The position and orientation of the main system hs been influenced by a gentle syncline plunging towards the northwest, and the height of the development of Short Drop Cave has been influenced by a major inception horizon between the Lower Hawes and Goredale Limestones, identifiable by a thin bed of shale and sometimes coal. Glasfurd's Chamber is thought to be part of a major phreatic passage formed some 350,000 years ago that took water from a major sink at Rumbling Hole, through Death's Head Hole and Glasfurd's Chamber, and hence to a resurgence in the Leck Beck valley some 100 metres (330 ft) above the current resurgence now covered with glacial till.

== History ==
The first recorded exploration of the Gavel Pot – Short Drop system was in 1885, when William Ecroyd (Note: William Ecroyd changed his name to William Ecroyd Farrer in 1896.), Geoffrey and Cuthbert Hastings descended one of the entrances in the Gavel Pot shakehole, and explored Short Drop Cave for a considerable distance upstream, using a ladder constructed out of iron piping and rope to scale the 5-metre (16 ft) high waterfall. They called the cave "Low Dowk Cave", seemingly under the impression it was Low Douk Cave near Marble Steps Pot. It was called "Gavel-pot" in 1842 by Jonathan Otley, and in 1881 Balderstone called it "Gavel or Navel Pot". Short Drop cave was explored through to Gavel Pot by a Yorkshire Ramblers' Club party in 1898. The University of Leeds Speleological Society undertook a major survey of the system in 1965 and pushed a lot of inlets and high level passages, including Masochist Passage and the Ancient Highway and opening up Rift Entrance, to extend the cave to a length of 2,250 metres (7,380 ft). The Coal Hole entrance was explored to Short Drop in 1977 by the Cave Projects Group.

The main passages in Gavel Pot were first explored in 1970, when the Northern Pennine Club excavated a shaft in the final chamber. The upstream terminal sump was originally dived by Dave Yeandle. Geoff Yeadon descended the sump to a depth of 41 metres (135 ft) in 1974, and the shaft was finally bottomed in 1985 by Rob Palmer. The downstream underwater connection with Lost Johns' Cave was made by Bob Churcher in 1975, and with Pippikin Pot in 1989 by Geoff Yeadon.
