= Gragareth =

Mountain in England

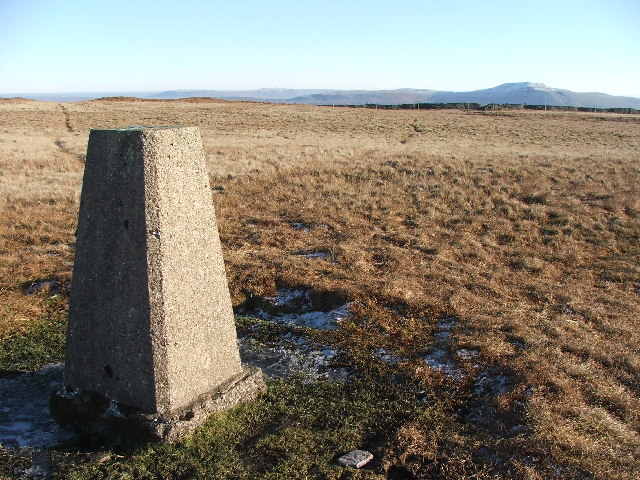
- Gragareth trig point

Highest point
- Elevation: 627 m (2,057 ft)
- Prominence: 30 m (98 ft)
- Parent peak: Great Coum
- Listing: Hewitt, county top
- Coordinates: 54°12′31″N 2°28′53″W

Geography
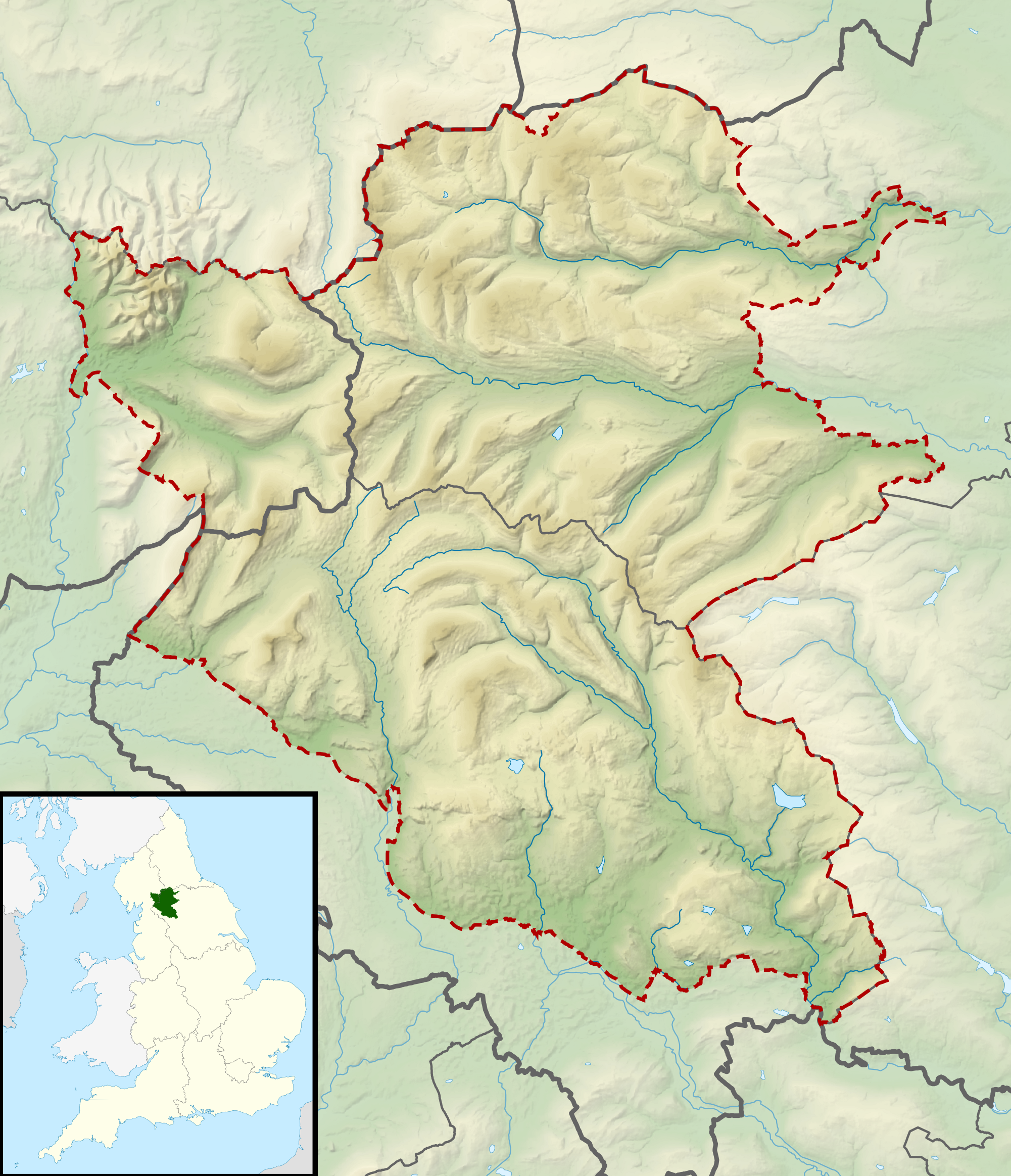
- Location within Yorkshire Dales Location within Lancashire Location within North Yorkshire Location within the City of Lancaster district
- Location: Lancashire, England
- Parent range: Yorkshire Dales (but summit is 200m outside border of county)
- OS grid: SD687793
- Topo map: OS OL2

Gragareth is a mountain straddling the border between Lancashire and North Yorkshire in England. At 627 metres (2,057 ft), its summit is the second-highest point in the post-1974 county of Lancashire. The highest point in modern Lancashire is Green Hill (one metre higher), approximately 3.2 km (2.0 mi) to the north and the Old Man of Coniston in the Furness Fells of the Lake District at 803 metres (2,635 ft) is the county top of the traditional county of Lancashire. The summit of Gragareth lies about 200 m west of the county boundary, but inside the 2016 border of Yorkshire Dales National Park. The western slopes are known as Leck Fell and the southern slopes form Ireby Fell.

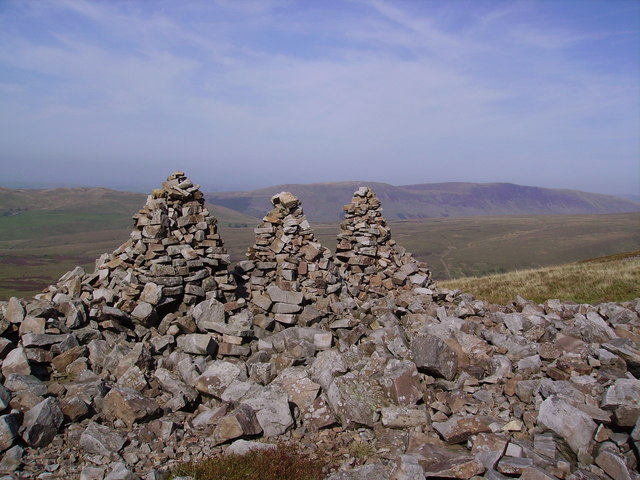
Three Men of Gragareth

The summit has a trig point and extensive views towards Morecambe Bay, the Lake District fells, the Howgill Fells, Ingleborough and the Forest of Bowland. The county boundary wall running along the ridge is believed to be "one of the highest dry stone walls in the country." The Three Men of Gragareth are a group of tall cairns on the western side of the hill above Leck Fell House. Historically the hill was often called Greygarth Fell.

The fell contains several caves including Lost John's Cave, Rumbling Hole and Ireby Fell Cavern.

Wainwright includes "The ascent of Gragareth via Leck Fell returning via Ireby Fell" in his Walks in Limestone Country. His route begins at Ireby village, following a lane from Todgill Farm on the Leck road to the tarmac road which leads to Leck Fell House, then "a steep scramble" up past the Three Men. His descent route is down a long enclosure formed by the county boundary to the east and the almost-parallel boundary between Leck and Ireby parishes, dropping down Ireby Fell past the opening of Ireby Fell Cavern, to return to Ireby.
