= Boxhead Pot =

Cave in Lancashire, England

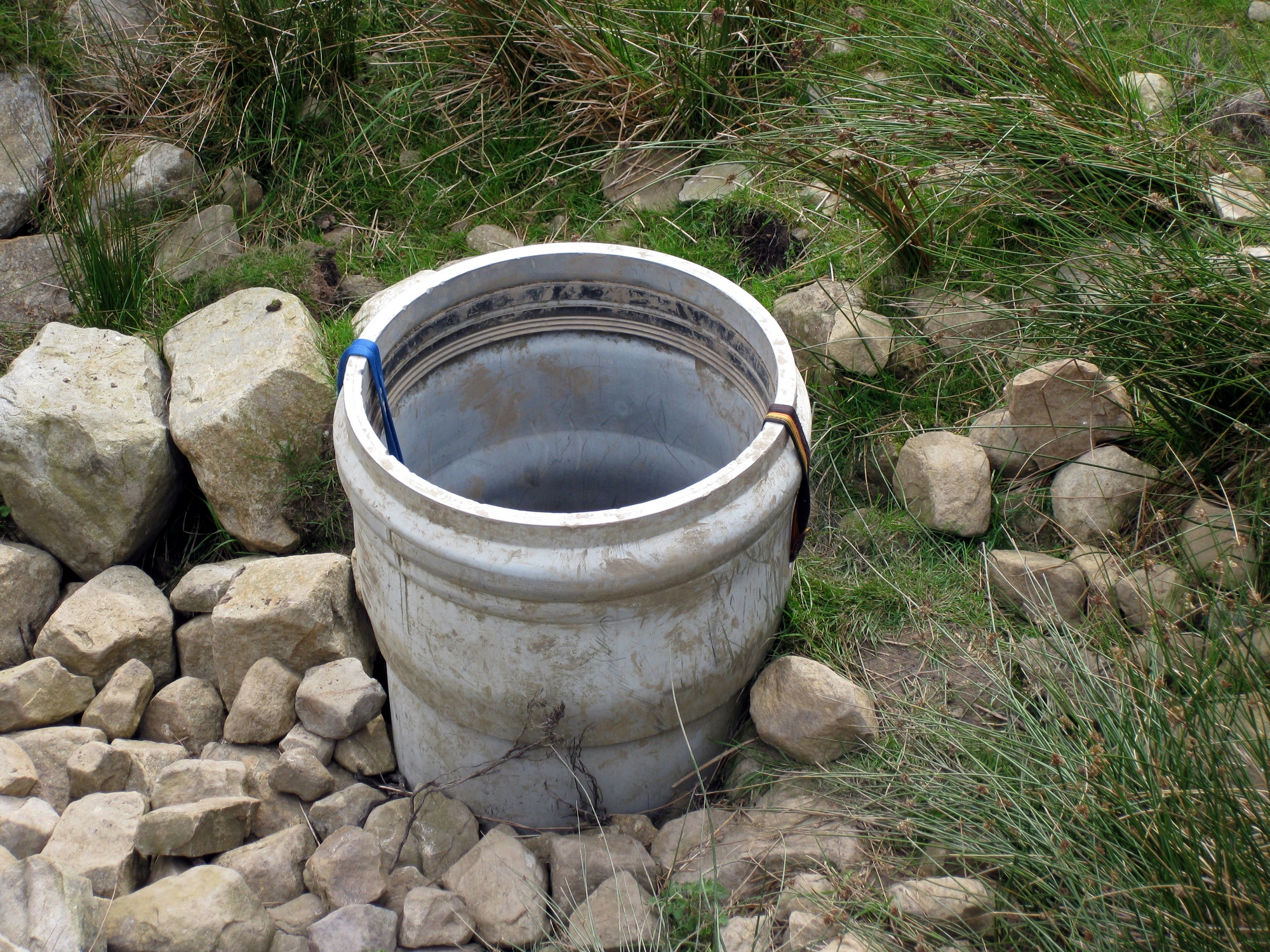
- The Entrance to Boxhead Pot

- Location within Yorkshire Dales
- Location: Leck Fell, Lancashire, England
- OS grid: SD 67130 78337
- Coordinates: 54°12′00″N 2°30′21″W
- Depth: 105 metres (344 ft)
- Length: about 10 metres (33 ft)
- Elevation: 360 metres (1,180 ft)
- Discovery: 1994
- Geology: Carboniferous limestone
- Entrances: 1
- Hazards: verticality
- Access: Unrestricted
- Cave survey: cavemaps

Boxhead Pot is a cave on Leck Fell, in Lancashire, England. It leads into the top end of Lost Johns' Cave, and is part of the Three Counties System, an 87 kilometres (54 mi) cave system which spans the borders of Cumbria, Lancashire, and North Yorkshire.

== Description ==
The entrance is in a deep shakehole 30 metres (98 ft) south of Lost Pot. A vertical pipe leads directly onto the top of a 34 metres (112 ft) shaft which lands on an unstable boulder ledge. Below that a 68-metre (223 ft) deep spacious shaft descends to the bottom of one of the two NPC Avens at the top end of Lost Johns' Cave (Lost Pot enters from the second aven).

== Geology and hydrology ==
The cave is a solutional cave formed in Visean Great Scar limestone from the Mississippian Series of the Carboniferous period. Its development has been largely determined by a vertical fault and a number of major joints. The streams that flow through the cave originate from small surface sinks, and are the main source of the water that flows through Lost Johns' Master Cave. It eventually emerges from the Leck Beck Head spring in Ease Gill. The current outlet at the base of Boxhead Pot is small, but there are a series of abandoned phreatic passages, called the Tate Galleries, 10 metres (33 ft) above the floor of the current outlet, and it is thought that the shafts were formed before the Devensian glaciation, and were originally drained by those passages.

== History ==
The Boxhead Pot shafts were originally climbed from below in the late 1980s by Mick Nunwick. In the autumn of 1994, Northern Cave Club cavers found an open and unstable hole in a shakehole, which they descended to land at the bottom of the NPC Avens in Lost Johns'. The cave was named after Alan Box, a club member who had died in a Spanish cave the previous year. The entrance was stabilised in 1995.
