= Lost Pot =

Cave in Lancashire, England

- Location within Yorkshire Dales
- Location: Leck Fell, Lancashire, England
- OS grid: SD 67097841
- Coordinates: 54°12′01″N 2°30′21″W
- Depth: 105 metres (344 ft)
- Length: about 80 metres (260 ft)
- Elevation: 360 metres (1,180 ft)
- Discovery: 1982
- Geology: Carboniferous limestone
- Entrances: 2
- Hazards: verticality, loose boulders
- Access: Unrestricted
- Cave survey: cavemaps

Lost Pot is a cave on Leck Fell, in Lancashire, England. It leads into the top end of Lost Johns' Cave, and is part of the Three Counties System, an 87 kilometres (54 mi) cave system which spans the borders of Cumbria, Lancashire, and North Yorkshire.

== Description ==
The entrance is in a 12-metre (39 ft) cliff-lined fenced shakehole. An excavated 9-metre (30 ft) deep shaft in the south-west corner of the shakehole leads into a chamber, where a further excavated shaft leads down for 8 metres (26 ft) to an unstable boulder slope above a 30 metres (98 ft) pitch. This drops into a high rift passage which passes under a high aven where It's a Cracker enters, and past an outlet passage down which the water flows. At the end of the rift, a small passage is the way through to the top of a 23 metres (75 ft) pitch which drops into one of the two NPC Avens at the top end of Lost Johns' Cave (Boxhead Pot enters from the second aven). The entrance to Lost Pot is currently sealed.

It's a Cracker (54.199942°N 2.505346°W) is a second entrance situated in a shakehole about 50 metres (160 ft) south-west of Lost Pot. A 10-metre (33 ft) deep excavated shaft enters a small chamber with an inlet. Downstream, a few metres of awkward passage leads to the top of the 32-metre (105 ft) deep Paparazzi Pitch. This lands at the head of a small cascade, at the base of which is a platform overlooking the 36 metres (118 ft) Park Bench Pitch. This drops into the large rift below the first pitch of Lost Pot.

== Geology and hydrology ==
The cave is a solutional cave formed in Visean Great Scar limestone from the Mississippian Series of the Carboniferous period. Its development has been largely determined by a vertical fault and a number of major joints. The streams that flow through the cave originate from small surface sinks, and are the main source of the water that flows through Lost Johns' Master Cave. It eventually emerges from the Leck Beck Head spring in Ease Gill. The current outlet at the base of Lost Pot is small, but there are a series of abandoned phreatic passages, called the Tate Galleries, 10 metres (33 ft) above the floor of the current outlet, and it is thought that the shafts were formed before the Devensian glaciation, and were originally drained by those passages.

== History ==
Lost Pot was first mentioned by name in 1922, where it is implied that it was named by S.W. Cutriss. There were a number of attempts by various clubs since 1968 to locate a cave at the bottom of the shakehole, but it was not until the beginning of 1982 that a concerted effort by members of the Northern Pennine Club succeeded in excavating a shaft through the boulders into the passages below. The boulder slope found at the head of the first big pitch was very unstable, and it was necessary to put in a considerable amount of effort into stabilising it before a descent could be made. The cave was eventually bottomed on 18 February. Two days later the same boulder slope collapsed whilst a party was at the bottom, severely injuring one member. He was brought out after a particularly hazardous rescue by the Cave Rescue Organisation. Soon after, the entrance was sealed.

The opening of Boxhead Pot in 1995 which entered down the second of the NPC Avens at the top end of Lost Johns' Cave provided relatively easy access to the area. Tim Allen took advantage of the new entrance to bolt up the big aven found in Lost Pot, followed by the aven discovered above, to a passage which terminated 6 metres (20 ft) below a shakehole near Lost Pot. A shaft was sunk from the surface to open up It's a Cracker in 2012.
