= Geoffrey Hastings =

English mountaineer (1860–1941)

Geoffrey Hastings FRGS (1860–1941) was a British mountaineer who made numerous first ascents of rock-faces and peaks in the Lake District, the Alps and Norway, and helped to lay the foundations for mountain-climbing as a sport. He, Albert Mummery and J. Norman Collie were authoritatively considered to be the finest climbing trio of their day and were the first to attempt to reach the summit of an eight-thousander in the Himalaya.

The standards of mountaineering established by the end of the nineteenth century by Hastings, Albert Mummery, William Cecil Slingsby and J. Norman Collie (called "the famous four" by their contemporary R. L. G. Irving[47]) have been assessed as "well ahead of those of other Britons climbing at the time and at the forefront of amateur climbing worldwide".[48]

== Birth and early life ==
Hastings was born at 2 Toller Lane, Manningham, Bradford, in 1860, the eldest son of Charles Hastings and his wife Anne (née Armytage). His father was a commission agent dealing in locally produced cloth and later a worsted spinner on his own account. The family prospered in the 1860s and 1870s and, after a spell at Rev. Edwin Bittleston's academy near Northallerton, Geoffrey was educated at Marlborough College. On leaving school in 1877 he joined his father's firm where he began by learning hand wool-combing, then considered necessary for a proper understanding of worsted manufacture. As a result of his father's financial difficulties (Note: Charles Hastings may have overstretched his resources in building Silsden House, which was designed for him by Norman Shaw and decorated by William Morris in 1879. He was bankrupt in 1883: Bradford Daily Telegraph, 16 February 1888 and 20 September 1883; Antiques Trade Gazette, London, 8 July 2023, p. 29.) he took over the business in 1884 but soon discontinued it, later working as an insurance broker and owning a window-cleaning company.

As a young man he had an appetite for all forms of physical recreation, participating in competitive rugby football and tennis, rowing, canoeing, swimming, and fell-walking. He stroked the four-oar gig boat that won the White Rose Challenge Cup in 1886 (Note: In the four-oar with Hastings were his brother Cuthbert and cousin John Hastings: Yorkshire Gazette, 17 July 1886. In 1890 Geoffrey and John received commendations from the Royal Humane Society for their attempt to rescue two men who drowned after being thrown from a boat that shot the weir at Saltaire: Shipley Times and Express, 1 November 1890. The cousin, later Colonel John Hastings, DSO, MBE, was raised in Bradford. He commanded in France the 2nd/6th West Yorkshire Regiment, 1914-17, and was Town Commandant at Arras: Yorkshire Evening Post, 10 April 1940.) and in August of the previous year had been first in each of the sculls, pair-oars and four-oars events at the Bradford Amateur Rowing Club regatta. His exertions with the oar contributed to development of "the muscles of Hercules" for which he was renowned in climbing circles.

== Cave exploration ==
He began rock-climbing and potholing in the early 1880s. A week after his successes at the Bradford regatta in 1885, he persuaded his brother Cuthbert Hastings to join him and their friend William Ecroyd in exploring the cavern below the Gavel Pot shakehole at Leck Fell (part of what is now known as the Three Counties cave system). (Note: This initiated Cuthbert into potholing, of which he became an enthusiast. He was President of the Gritstone Club (founded in 1922), a pioneer of underground flashlight photography (his picture of the interior of Gaping Ghyll, taken in 1905 and published in the Yorkshire Ramblers' Club Journal Vol. III, No. 11, was regarded as an early classic), and a student of subterranean insect life: Bradford Observer, 23 December 1943; Yorkshire Evening Post, 23 December 1943.) Having made the 130 feet (40 m)-deep descent of Gavel Pot, the three successfully negotiated the upstream waterfall beyond and made their way up the "long passage" leading towards Short Drop Cave, but after about 500 yards (460 m) its narrowness prevented further progress. Their venture has been described as "the first extensive cave exploration in Great Britain".

== Lake District ==
By 1885 Hastings was already exploring the Lake District with William Ecroyd's brother-in-law Cecil Slingsby. (Note: Alizon Ecroyd had married Slingsby in 1882. In 1896, in order to comply with the conditions of their great-uncle's will, her brother William took the surname Farrer, under which he appears in the Dictionary of National Biography, 1922-30 (William Farrer (1861-1924), historian of Lancashire).) Slingsby was eleven years Hastings' senior and had been climbing extensively at home and abroad for more than a decade. Hastings readily absorbed the wisdom and technique Slingsby imparted during their climbs together and in March 1885 the pair attempted ascent of the unclimbed Deep Ghyll on Scafell: they were defeated by ice, but in March the following year they repeated the attempt with success.

Hastings was introduced by Slingsby to a wide circle of mountain enthusiasts and began to climb with Walter Haskett Smith, Edward Hopkinson, Albert Mummery and John Wilson Robinson. In 1887, with Slingsby and Haskett Smith, he made the first ascent of Needle Ridge on Great Gable, and he led the first party to climb Shamrock Gully on the east side of Pillar Rock. In this latter success the party was assisted by deep snow, and in December 1890 the feat was repeated under Hastings without the aid of snow.

In July 1888 he, Haskett Smith and Hopkinson made the first ascent of Great Gully on Doe Crag near Coniston and, augmented by Slingsby, the same group were first to climb Scafell Pinnacle by Steep Gill. In June 1886 Haskett Smith had attracted considerable interest when he climbed Napes Needle, a free standing pinnacle on Great Gable, and in March 1889 Hastings became the second to do so. In 1891, with Haskett Smith and Slingsby, he made the first ascent of Pillar Rock by the north face, regarded as "a remarkable feat for the period", and in the winter of 1891/2 he was in the party that first climbed the Great Gully of the Wastwater Screes.

With him in this latter endeavour was Norman Collie and, together with Robinson, they made the first ascent of Scafell's Moss Ghyll on 27 December 1892 (all previous parties attempting the climb having declared it impossible). Collie, who had learned to climb in the Cuillins on Skye, (Note: Hastings and Collie may have first climbed together on Skye, which Hastings visited with an Alpine Club expedition in 1890. They climbed together in Scotland in 1894: on the day after Collie made the first climb of Ben Nevis by Tower Ridge in winter conditions he repeated the ascent with Hastings: Lionel W. Hinxman, "The Castle Ridge of Carn Dearg", Scottish Mountaineering Club Journal, Vol. III, p. 316.) pointed to Hastings as one of the pioneers who established the Lake District as a mountaineering resort by demonstrating that rock climbing of every degree of difficulty could be experienced among the hills surrounding the head of Wastdale.

In March 1893 Hastings and Slingsby were elected Fellows of the Royal Geographical Society.

== The Alps ==
In August 1892 Hastings had visited Chamonix and, with Collie, Mummery and C. H. Pasteur, made the first traverse of the Aiguille du Grépon by the north ridge, descending by the south. This was probably his first Alpine excursion and he returned in the following year when, with Collie, Mummery and Slingsby, he made the first ascent of the Dent du Requin (regarded as a significant event in the history of Alpine climbing) (Note: The Dent du Requin had previously been known as the Aiguille de Blaitière derrière and was renamed after the 1892 ascent: the choice of the new name has been attributed both to Collie and Martin Conway (Simon Thompson, Unjustifiable Risk? The Story of British Climbing, Cicerone Press Limited, 2012).) and the first traverse of the Aiguille du Plan, reaching the summit by the unclimbed Col des Deux Aigles (which has since rarely been ascended).

He again returned to Chamonix in the summer of 1894 and, with Mummery and Collie, crossed the Mont Blanc range from the Argentière Glacier by the steep approach to the Col des Courtes, the first time this route had been taken. Four days later they completed the first guideless ascent of the Brenva Wall route and, shortly afterwards, the second ascent of the Aiguille Verte's Moine ridge, which they had believed to be unclimbed.

Theirs was the sixth ascent of the Brenva Wall route but its accomplishment without guides established a precedent. J. P. Farrar, who in the previous year had made the fifth ascent, considered it "the greatest of this famous party's ice-climbs in the Alps. No finer exhibition of determination and skill has ever been given by any amateur party". The party's success "opened the door wider to guideless climbing" at a time when that practice was not encouraged, and in some measure resisted, by the Alpine Club.

== Nanga Parbat ==
In 1894 Hastings and Mummery agreed that, if they could obtain Indian government permission to visit the relevant part of Kashmir, they would attempt to climb Nanga Parbat (8,126 metres) in the following year. Permission obtained, Collie arranged to join them and "the three musketeers" (as they had become known) sailed for Bombay in June 1895. A month later they established base camp in the Rupal Valley but, Mummery concluding there was little prospect of success on the south face of Nanga Parbat, they elected to relocate to the valley of the Diamir Glacier in order to attempt the north-west face.

In the course of this relocation the party twice crossed the Mazeno ridge by indirect routes and at one stage Hastings and Mummery climbed to a height of about 6,400 metres. Having been joined by two hillmen from the 5th Gurkha Rifles, the party re-established base camp in Diamir and from there, in mid-August, Mummery and one of the Gurkhas ascended Nanga Parbat's north-west face to more than 6,000 metres before the Gurkha's sickness forced them to return, leaving rucksacks behind them. The party then decided to move base to the Rakhiot valley, to allow examination of the mountain's north face. Mummery elected that he and the Gurkhas would recover the abandoned rucksacks and then cross to Rakhiot over a col at 6,200 metres. Hastings was suffering from a damaged heel, and the plan was that, along with Collie and the party's porters, he would transfer the camping equipment by a lower route. On 24 August Mummery and the Gurkhas set out for the col, leaving behind a stock of provisions in case they had to turn back in favour of the route followed by the others. They were never seen again.

Reaching Rakhiot after two days, Hastings and Collie looked by telescope for traces of steps cut in the ridge offering Mummery the only feasible descent from the col. Seeing none, they assumed he had turned back. After a period of bad weather and Mummery's continued absence, they grew anxious. Hastings returned alone to Diamir where on 1 September he found, undisturbed, the precautionary provisions Mummery had left behind on 24 August. For Hastings to attempt to search the glacier by himself would have been a hopeless task, and he made for Chilas where the officer in command mobilised villagers to explore the Diamir valleys. A fortnight later, in company with Collie, Hastings returned to the Diamir glacier, but winter was now setting in and avalanches were thundering down the face of Nanga Parbat. In the words of Collie, "Hastings and I soon saw that any attempt at exploration was out of the question... Slowly we descended and for the last time looked on the great mountain and the white snows where in some unknown spot our friends lay buried". (Note: Not until 1953, after nearly thirty lives had been lost in the attempt, was Nanga Parbat eventually conquered.)

When returning from the Himalaya, Hastings failed to observe certain conditions that the Indian government had imposed on the expedition, and the resultant protests led to his resignation from the Alpine Club.

== Norway ==
Hastings' initial expedition to Norway was with Slingsby (known internationally as the "Father of Norwegian Mountaineering") in 1889, when the pair made the first ascent of Mjolkedalspiggen and of Lodals Kaupe from the valley of Justedal, and when Hastings, climbing alone, was first to ascend Jonshorn and Raana. Thereafter he visited the country with sufficient regularity that he became fluent in Norwegian.

With Howard Priestman (Note: Like Hastings, Priestman (1865-1931) was a native of Bradford and a member of its amateur rowing club; he had lived on Toller Lane and was present at Hastings' life-saving attempt at Saltaire in 1890 (see Note 2). He was a distinguished mountaineer in his own right and a friend of Fridtjof Nansen: Alpine Journal, Vol. 44 (1932), p. 114.) and Hermann Woolley he climbed in the Lofoten islands in August 1897, their party being the first to reach the summit of Store Svartsundtind. He then travelled to the Lyngen Alps where he made the first ascent of Jiehkkevarri ("the Mont Blanc of the North"), the highest peak of the range. (Note: Some unsourced accounts state that the first ascent of Jiehkkevarre was made by Hastings and Elias Hogrenning in 1899. These presumably confuse the pair's traverse of the mountain in that year (Alpine Journal, Vol. 19, pp. 613-614) with Hastings' earlier ascent (Alpine Journal, Vol. 18, p. 65, and Vol. 19, p. 215).) By this ascent, wrote Slingsby, Hastings "opened for mountaineering what is in many respects the most delightful region in Norway".

In 1898, he shared with Slingsby and Haskett Smith "a most successful campaign in Lyngen". He and Slingsby made the first ascent of Istinden and, with Haskett Smith and Elias Hogrenning, were the first to climb Stortind, Hringhorn, Store Jaegervasstind, Store Lenangstind, Storebotntind and Fornaestind. In the same year he and Hogrenning also became the first climbers to reach the highest point on the Oksfjordjokelen glacier, while the full party's exploration of the deep valley of the Strupskar and the Strupbreen glacier resulted in discovery of the Strupvatnet lake. (Note: Hastings' own accounts of his exploration in the Lyngen Alps appeared in Alpine Journal, Vol. 19 (1899), pp. 356-363 (ascents between 11 July and 22 August 1898) and 611-615 (ascents between 22 June and 11 July 1899).)

Slingsby later recalled it was on Istinden (which he called Kjostind) that "a few hundred feet below the summit Hastings paid me the one compliment with which he has ever honoured me, and I am very proud of it. It was in the good Yorkshire dialect in which we sons of the North are so fond of indulging when out on the fells, and was merely 'Thar't a toff un'."

Hastings returned to Norway in 1899 when, with Slingsby and the latter's nephews, he made the first ascent of Slogen by the grand northern arête at the head of Norangsfjord. On 3 July that year he and Hogrenning made the first ascent of Store Durmalstind, immediately followed by a traverse of Jiehkkevarri. He was back again in 1901 when he and Collie made the first ascent of Higravstinden and, with Priestman and Woolley, of Geitgaljartind in Lofoten. On the latter visit, as was often the case during his Norwegian expeditions, he took charge of the party's commissariat and, when camped near the head of the Ostnes Fjord, his tent was said to have "the appearance of a really first-class gipsy encampment".

== The Rockies ==
In August 1909 Hastings went to Canada with Leo Amery, who had set his sights on being the first to climb Mount Robson, the highest peak in the Canadian Rockies. Their party included Arnold Louis Mumm and his Swiss guide Moritz Inderbinden who, two years earlier, had made the first ascent of Trisul, the world's highest summit to be reached. The group walked 400 miles from Edmonton to reach Mount Robson, learning en route that Rev. George Kinney claimed to have succeeded in climbing it a few days earlier. Their own climb was interrupted so as to avoid an overnight stay on the mountain, and what was intended as a temporary retreat was followed by three days of continuous rain, causing the party to abandon their expedition. This was Hastings' only recorded excursion to North America.

== Qualities and reputation as a mountaineer ==
The standards of mountaineering established by the end of the nineteenth century by Mummery, Slingsby, Hastings and Collie (called "the famous four" by their contemporary R. L. G. Irving) have been assessed as "well ahead of those of other Britons climbing at the time and at the forefront of amateur climbing worldwide".

Hastings was "always the strong man of the team", ready to act as the beast of burden for his party (Note: According to J. P. Farrar, Mummery "never carried anything whatever on a mountain. I believe when Mummery, Collie and Hastings climbed together Hastings carried the lot": T. S. Blakeney, "Some Notes on A. F. Mummery", Alpine Journal, No. 60 (1955), p. 119.) and, according Eleanor Winthrop Young, possessed of a "weird energy at all times which left us rather breathless". Haskett Smith spoke of his "great muscular strength, grim determination, and manual dexterity", his particular skill in step-cutting ("rapid and untiring"), and his unfailing mettle ("be the difficulty and danger what they might, non-one could wish for a stauncher comrade"). Mummery referred to his capacity for "extraordinary daring and skill", while Slingsby simply called him "a brilliant mountaineer".

Although he was a good leader, he was more often second on the rope in ascent and sometimes last in descent, serving as the sheet-anchor of the line or enabled by his strength to lift up or serve as a ladder for those who followed. Mummery remarked that he "always knew how to inspire the leader with confidence by his remarks", while A. Carson Roberts, returning from a 1905 expedition with Hastings in Dauphine, asked rhetorically "Was there ever a better second man?"

He was celebrated for producing "unimagined luxuries" from his rucksack at critical moments in a climb: Mummery spoke of "the all-producing bag of Hastings" yielding the wherewithal for "one of those sumptuous meals with which Hastings invariably treats his companions". Sometimes the contents of the bag were less indulgent. Dorothy Pilley Richards recalled being at the foot of Dent du Géant in 1920 when "I spied Mr Geoffrey Hastings and worshipped. Was he not the doughtiest hero remaining from the Mummery Epoch? He did not let my expectations down. An enormous sack jutted out from between his shoulders. When he lowered it the ground shook and he divulged that he made a practice of filling it with boulders to keep himself in training". He was then aged 60.

== Marriage and final years ==
After his serious climbing days were over, Hastings gave much of his time to the cause of rowing in Bradford, teaching boys to row on the river at Saltaire. According to Haskett Smith, he was also "a devoted dancer". In 1917 he married Josephine Gregory, a niece of Sir William Priestley, MP for Bradford East, and sister of the art publisher and patron Eric Craven Gregory. The couple lived in Welbury Drive, Manningham, until Hastings' death in February 1941, when an obituary tribute in the Yorkshire Post described him as "one of the finest men Bradford has produced. He was a great influence for good. He stood for everything that is wholesome and clean." His widow died in 1967.

== Legacy ==
An important element in Hastings' legacy are the photographs he took during his various expeditions. Many of these are in the Alpine Club collection and provide a record which has enabled measurement of glacial retreat during the century since they were taken. (Note: See, for example, the Norwegian Water Resource and Energy Directorate's report Regional Change of Glaciers in Norway, 2000 (ed. Liss Andreassen), reproducing at pp. 68, 70 and 77 photographs taken by Hastings in the period 1897-99.)
