= Cave digging =

Enlarging cave openings

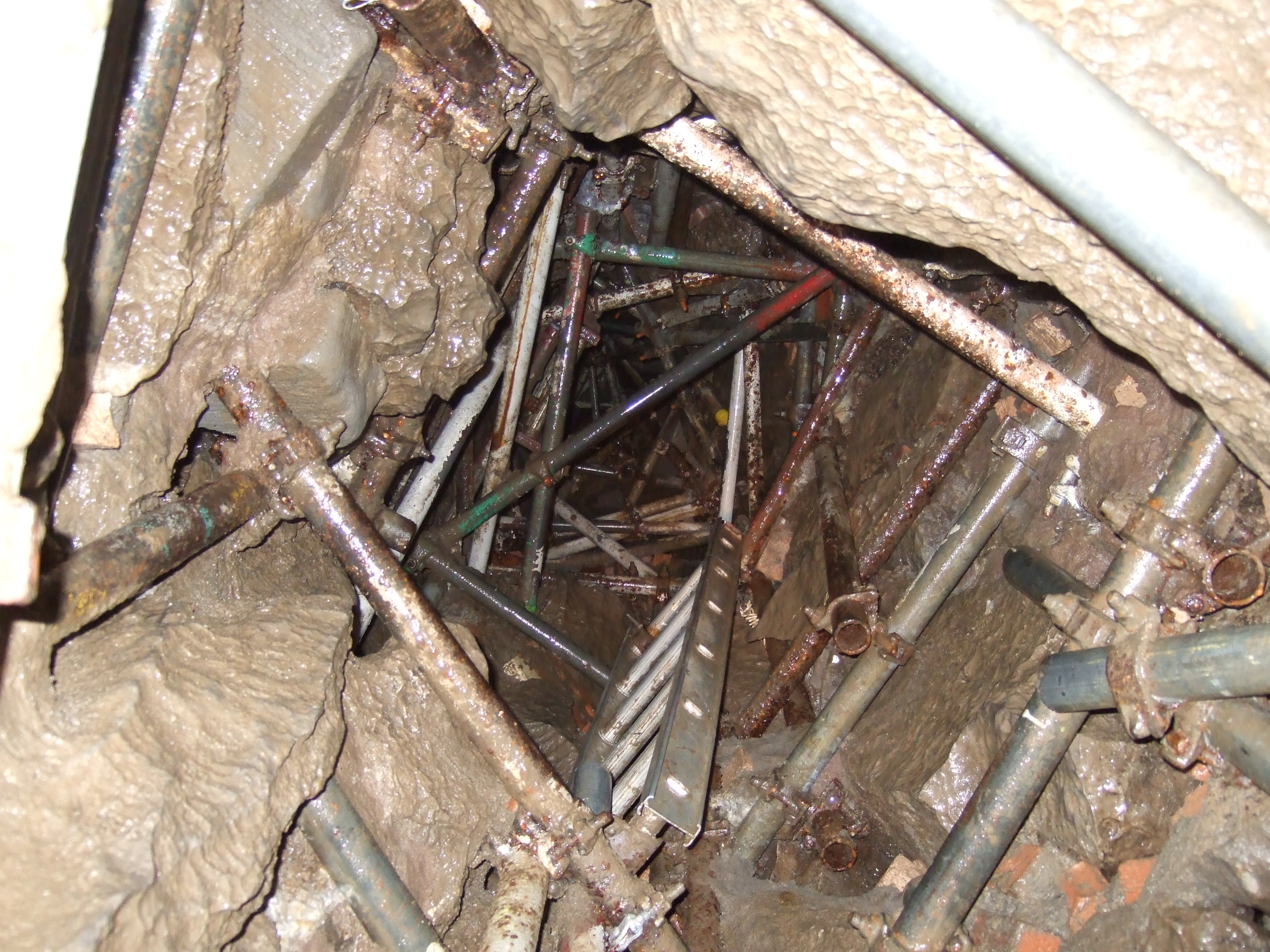
Looking up the entrance shaft of Committee Pot entrance to Notts II Cave on Leck Fell which was dug after divers had accessed an extensive cave system below

Cave digging is the practice of enlarging openings of caves to allow entry. Cave digging usually begins with a survey of mountains and valleys in karst topography searching for new caves, with the goal of creating accessible entrances. Whether outside an inaccessible cave or inside an already accessible cave, when a space is evident on the other side of a blocked passage, there are various possible ways to widen an entrance: including rearranging rocks and the use of explosives.

The area around digs may be unstable, and it must often be shored up with scaffolding or concrete to prevent it collapsing again. This can be a dangerous activity.

== Geological cave indicators ==
Most of the obvious caves in countries with a well-established caving community have already been discovered and explored, so cavers must search for new caves. This is most commonly accomplished by scouring the countryside in areas with potential for previously undiscovered openings to the underground. These may be found in sinkholes, in rock outcrops, or anywhere the ground is underlain by limestone or other soluble rock. Areas underlain by lava flows or where lava tubes are found may also contain new caves.

If the discovered feature is significantly draughting air either in or out, this is an encouraging indication that there is potential for a large or extensive cave beyond.

== Technique ==
On occasion, a newly discovered opening will be large enough for the average person to enter, but often they are too small and must be enlarged to allow entry. If the entrance is too small, it is enlarged using cave digging techniques.

Sometimes digging simply involves moving a few rocks and some soil. This can be accomplished with the bare hands or may involve the use of folding army shovels, root-pruning saws, hammer and chisels, buckets to move the material, and rope to haul the buckets if the opening is being enlarged in a downward direction. Large tamping tools and crowbars are also useful in dislodging the rocks and soil as the digging progresses.

Sometimes, the use of equipment and brute force is not enough to gain entry into the cave. In cases such as these, serious diggers resort to more intensive means of opening the cave. Many "digs" become large group projects, involving backhoes, timber shoring, and even the use of large diameter well drilling methods.

Where the main impediment is solid rock, entry may require rock shaving. This consists of drilling holes in the rock, filling them with a small amount of gunpowder, and then igniting it to fragment the rock into thin layers. A similar technique, called plug and feather, involves driving wedges into lines of small diameter holes that have been drilled in the rock. As the wedges are driven into the holes, a crack forms along the line of holes, and the rock is eventually broken. A more recently developed technique is known as "capping", where a hole is drilled into the rock using a battery-powered drill, a small charge (commonly designed for use with a nail gun) is inserted, and tapped with a long steel rod in order to cleave off pieces of rock. An environmental and safety assessment should be conducted before blasting to ensure minimal impact to the cave environment.

== Impact ==
Cave digging can damage the cave by exposing it to the outside world or through the force needed to enter. This can harm the ecology within the cave. Careless cave digging can also lead to destruction or irresponsible removal of items with archeological significance.
