= Death's Head Hole =

Cave in Lancashire, England

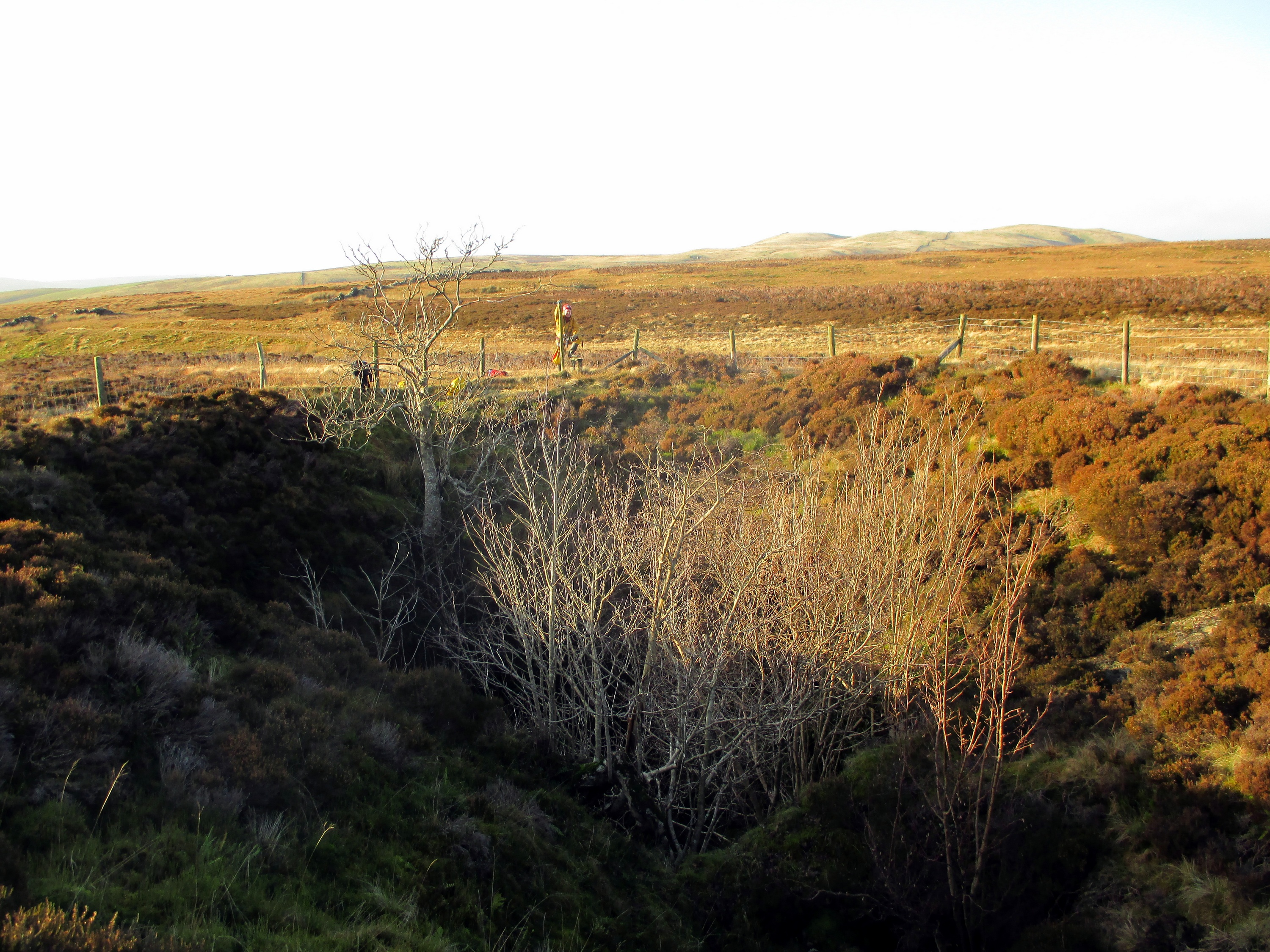
- Entrance of Death's Head Hole

- Location within Yorkshire Dales
- Location: Leck Fell, Lancashire, England
- OS grid: SD 6678 7916
- Coordinates: 54°12′25″N 2°30′38″W
- Depth: 120 metres (390 ft)
- Length: 567 metres (1,860 ft)
- Elevation: 335 metres (1,099 ft)
- Discovery: 1889
- Geology: Carboniferous limestone
- Entrances: 3
- Hazards: verticality
- Access: Unrestricted
- Cave survey: cavemaps

Death's Head Hole is a cave on Leck Fell, in Lancashire, England. Its entrance is a 64-metre (210 ft) deep shaft. It leads into Lost Johns' Cave and is part of the Three Counties System, an 87-kilometre (54 mi) cave system which spans the borders of Cumbria, Lancashire, and North Yorkshire.

== Description ==
The fenced entrance shaft descends some 64 metres (210 ft) onto a loose boulder slope which leads to a second pitch of 6 metres (20 ft) into the Main Chamber, a large chamber with a waterfall entering at the east end. An excavated 10-metre (33 ft) deep scaffolded shaft in the bottom corner of the chamber soon leads into a stream passage some 100 metres (330 ft) long which ends at a 4-metre (13 ft) waterfall into the main Lost Johns' Master Cave about 200 metres (660 ft) from its terminal sump.

A 23-metre (75 ft) climb up the waterfall in the Main Chamber enters East Passage, a well decorated phreatic passage with a misfit stream. It passes under an aven, (Note: An aven is hole in the roof of a cave passage that may be either a rather large blind roof pocket or a tributary inlet shaft into the cave system) and eventually lowers to a silted crawl after 150 metres (490 ft). The aven has been climbed for 43 metres (141 ft) to a choked inlet. The stream enters East Passage from a low crawl after 50 metres (160 ft), called Dolphin Passage. This gets larger, and passes a small passage heading towards Eyeholes, a choked pothole located some 50 metres north-east of the entrance to Death's Head Hole, before reaching a very wet section. This has been forced through to the bottom of Long Drop Cave, which is the source of the water.

Big Meanie (also called Hawthorn Pot and Nostril Pot) is another entrance into the system situated about 100 metres (330 ft) due west of Death's Head Hole, in a shakehole by a kink in the wall. A tight rift leads directly onto a 49-metre (161 ft) pitch which lands in a tall fissure passage. To the west, the passage terminates in a large chamber and a mud choke. To the east the passage divides, with one branch heading towards Eyeholes before becoming too tight, and the other passing through a dug-out constriction into a muddy crawl that finishes on a ledge 21 metres (69 ft) above the floor of the Death's Head Main Chamber, opposite East Passage.

== Geology and hydrology ==
The cave is a solutional cave formed in Visean Great Scar limestone from the Mississippian Series of the Carboniferous period. Its development has been largely determined by the same vertical fault encountered in Rumbling Hole and Big Meanie. The stream which flows through the cave originates from Long Drop Cave, and flows through to Lost Johns' Cave as a tributary, to eventually emerge from the Leck Beck Head spring in Ease Gill. It is thought that what is now the main cave is relatively recent, and that some 350,000 years ago water sinking at Rumbling Hole followed a phreatic trunk route along the fault, entering Death's Head Hole at the end of East Passage, flowed across what is now the Main Chamber, into the passages below Big Meanie. From here the water flowed through a continuation of the now-blocked passage to Glasfurds Chamber in Gavel Pot, and hence to a resurgence in the Leck Beck Valley some 100 metres (330 ft) above the current resurgence, which is now covered with glacial till.

== History ==
Balderstone described the entrance shaft to Death's Head Hole in detail in 1881 in Ingleton - Bygone and Present, and plumbed it at 200 feet (61 m):

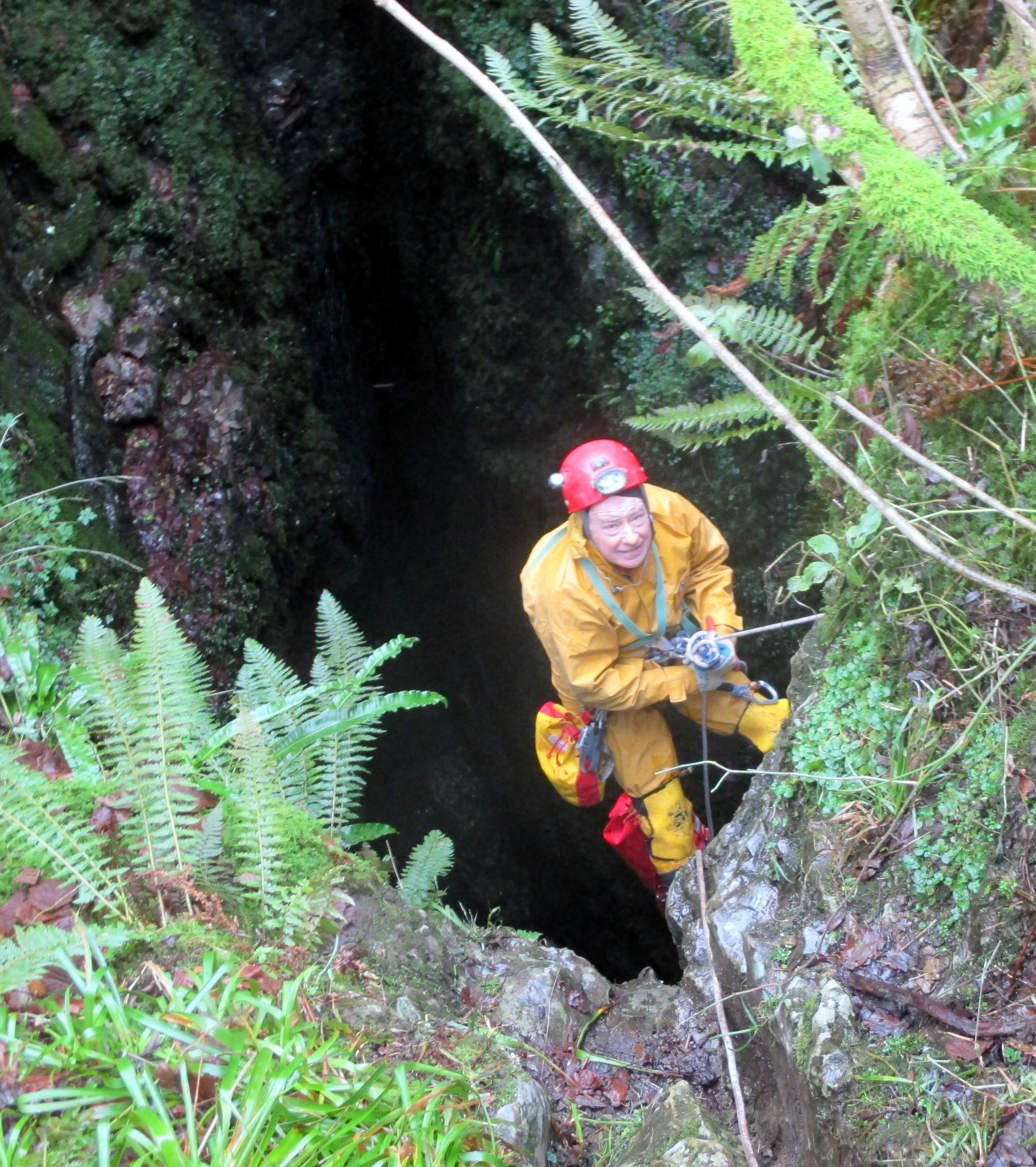
A caver descending the entrance shaft

Here is another chasm like the Fairies' Workshop, not so richly adorned, but still radiant in its embellishments, yet possessing a most remarkable configuration, indeed, that of the head and jaws of a human skeleton. The main shaft of the hole represents the mouth; a bridgelike bar of rock passes across the eastern verge, but is hollow below, so as to connect the chasm with a more shallow cavity beyond. The most peculiar feature, however, consists in a second bar-like bridge of limestone somewhat more slender than the first, spanning the secondary rift in exactly the opposite direction to that assumed by the former, so as to meet the greater bar in the middle of its course and form part of the same trellice bridgework. In this manner two cavities, like those of the orbits in a skull are produced; and the result is wonderfully curious and fine.

The first descent was by the Yorkshire Ramblers' Club in 1889, when they reached the bottom of the Main Chamber, and noted the stream entering from the east. In 1892 the cave was referred to as "Hell Hole" by the local historian and writer Harry Speight, who mistakenly reported that "the true bottom has never been reached". The inlet passage in Lost Johns' Cave was noted by the Yorkshire Ramblers on their original exploration in 1928, but the water was assumed to originate from Gavel Pot. The connection with Lost Johns' Cave was opened up, by a team from a variety of clubs, in 2011.

The waterfall in the Main Chamber was climbed in 1949 by members of the Gritstone Club, who explored East Passage and Dolphin Passage, the inlet from Long Drop Cave. The connection with Long Drop Cave was made after bailing the short section of waterlogged passage, by the Gritstone Club in 1981.

The entrance to Big Meanie was dug open by Manchester University Speleological Society (MUSS) in 1971. The connection with Death's Head Hole was opened up in the same year by a joint team from MUSS, Happy Wanderers Cave and Pothole Club, and Northern Cave Club digging through a boulder obstacle.

== See also ==
- Caving in the United Kingdom
