= Long Drop Cave =

Cave in Lancashire, England

- Location within Yorkshire Dales
- Location: Leck Fell, Lancashire, England
- OS grid: SD 66967917
- Coordinates: 54°12′26″N 2°30′28″W
- Depth: 61 metres (200 ft)
- Length: 283 metres (928 ft)
- Elevation: 351 metres (1,152 ft)
- Discovery: 1965
- Geology: Carboniferous limestone
- Entrances: 2
- Hazards: Verticality, water
- Access: Unrestricted
- Cave survey: cavemaps

Long Drop Cave is a cave on Leck Fell, in Lancashire, England. It leads into Death's Head Hole, and is part of the Three Counties System, an 87-kilometre (54 mi) cave system which spans the borders of Cumbria, Lancashire, and North Yorkshire.

== Description ==
The entrance is below a small cliff in a shakehole. From the wide overhanging entrance, a short crawl leads onto an 8 metres (26 ft) dry shaft. At the bottom, an excavated route leads into a narrow stream passage, with a narrow 5 metres (16 ft) pitch a few metres downstream. Below this, about 20 metres (66 ft) of narrow passage leads to the top of the third pitch, where the system enlarges dramatically. A 29-metre (95 ft) pitch passes a ledge, and lands in Fault Chamber, where a vertical geological fault can be seen to have a 150 centimetres (59 in) throw. A further 8-metre (26 ft) pitch leads to a final chamber and a stream passage. Upstream, the water emerges from an impenetrable fissure, downstream passes through a low crawl before the going eases, passing under some avens. After 60 metres (200 ft) the passage becomes a waterlogged tube which is normally sumped. This can be baled from the downstream end, to allow a through trip to Dolphin Passage in Death's Head Hole.

In Fault Chamber, an easy climb up the eastern rift reaches a small window, that can be forced to an 8 metres (26 ft) pitch that drops into an independent streamway - High Stream Passage. Upstream leads to an aven with an inlet entering, and a narrow 20-metre (66 ft) long passage leading to a second aven. Downstream leads into High Stream Chamber where the water sinks in boulders to emerge from the impenetrable fissure mentioned above. A 22-metre (72 ft) pitch drops into High Stream Chamber from Humble Inlet. Two passages can be reached from the top. Upstream, 100 metres (330 ft) of decorated passage ends in a mineralised choke on a fault in the area of Humble Pot. The downstream passage is smaller and wetter, and finishes in a blind 18-metre (59 ft) pit.

Short Long Drop is an alternative entrance located 10 metres (33 ft) from the main entrance. A tight rift leads to the top of an 8-metre (26 ft) shaft. At the bottom, a tight crawl connects with the bottom of the first pitch in the main cave.

== Geology and hydrology ==
The cave is a solutional cave formed in Visean Great Scar limestone from the Mississippian Series of the Carboniferous period. Its development has been largely determined by a vertical fault and a number of major joints. The streams that flow through the cave originate from small surface sinks. They flow through the lower passage into Dolphin Passage in Death's Head Hole, and hence into Lost John's Master Cave. It eventually emerges from the Leck Beck Head spring in Ease Gill.

== History ==
Long Drop Cave was known by the Yorkshire Ramblers' Club by 1922, when S. W. Cutriss described it as: "Long Drop Sink with the cave at the far end, a 10 foot passage leading to Long Drop itself, a perfect round dry shaft, 25 feet deep. There is no exit." The bottom of the shaft was dug by Bob Leakey and Gordon Batty in the 1950s, but without breaking through. The challenge was then picked up by members of the Gritstone Club in 1965, who succeeded in digging down a little further to expose a tight crawl which proved to be the breakthrough point into the main cave. Humble Inlet was discovered by members of the Burnley Caving Club in 1981, when they climbed a 22-metre (72 ft) high aven in High Stream Chamber. The end of the cave was connected to Death's Head Hole in 1981 by the Gritstone Club.

Short Long Drop was dug into and explored by members of the Red Rose Cave & Pothole Club in 2007.
