= Rumbling Hole =

Cave in Lancashire, England

- Fairies Workshop
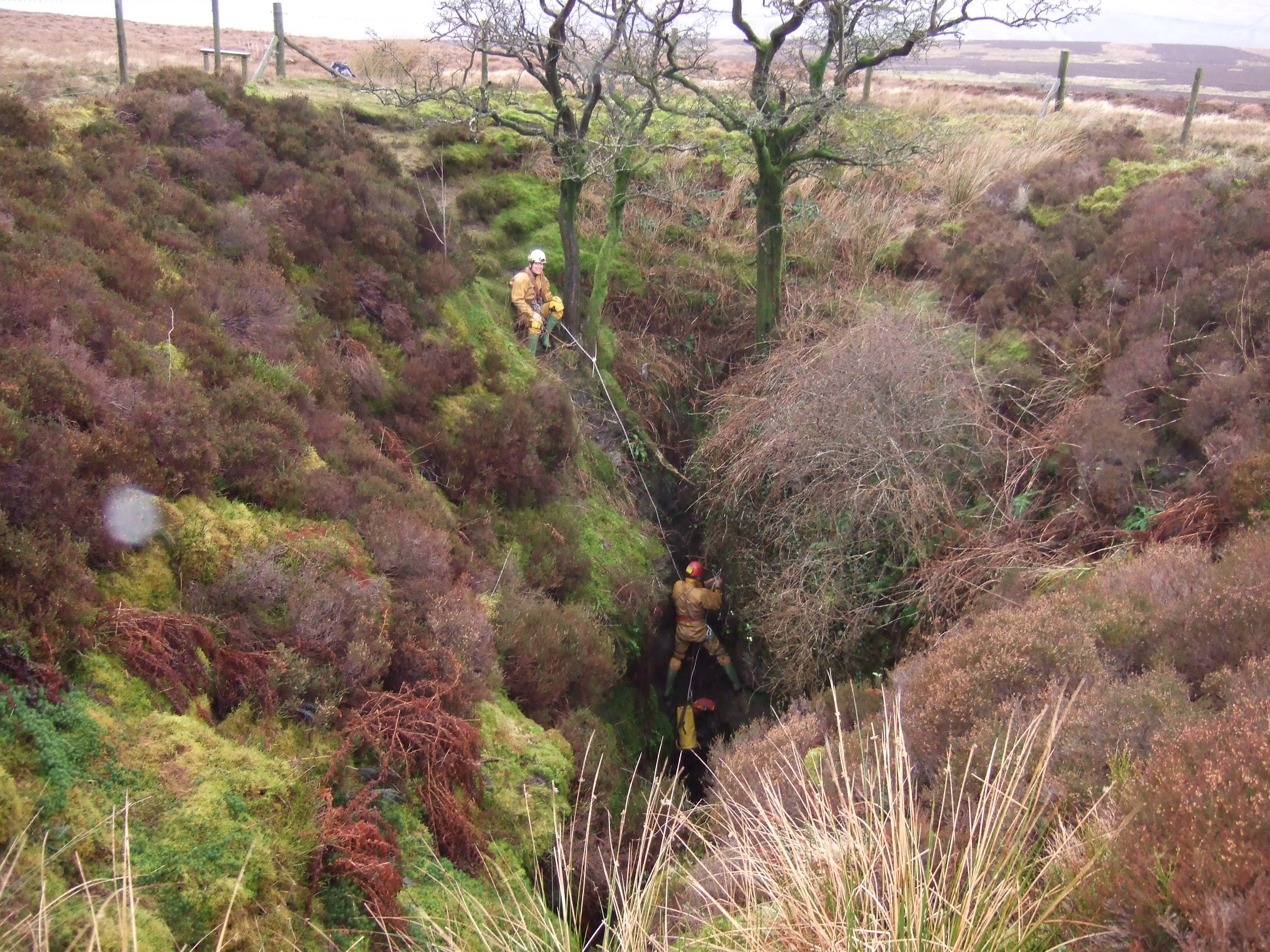
- Two cavers rigging the entrance pitch

- Location within Yorkshire Dales
- Location: Leck Fell, Lancashire, England
- OS grid: SD 6717379128
- Coordinates: 54°12′25″N 2°30′17″W
- Depth: 126 metres (413 ft) (including cave)
- Length: 1,091 metres (3,579 ft) (including cave)
- Elevation: 351 metres (1,152 ft)
- Discovery: 1899
- Geology: Carboniferous limestone
- Entrances: 2
- Hazards: verticality, water
- Access: Unrestricted
- Cave survey: cavemaps

Rumbling Hole is a cave on Leck Fell, in Lancashire, England. Its entrance is a 50-metre (160 ft) deep fenced shaft, and it rapidly descends a series of pitches to a low aqueous passage that has been connected to Lost Johns' Cave. It is part of the Three Counties System, an 87-kilometre (54 mi) cave system that spans the borders of Cumbria, Lancashire, and North Yorkshire.

== Description ==
The entrance shaft descends some 50 metres (160 ft), and the way on is through the water descending from Rumbling Beck Cave above into a fault passage. Four further pitches descend into a chamber to a low canal passage. Upstream gets too low after some 60 metres, but downstream has been forced round some awkward bends and through some ducks into Rumbling Hole Inlet in Lost Johns' Cave. This section of cave is about 250 metres (820 ft) long.

An alternative route begins from a passage entered a few metres below the west end of the entrance shaft. These passages are, in the main, tighter and more complex than the main route, but the main passage descends an alternative set of pitches to a sump which is believed to be the upstream sump of the inlet canal at the end of the main route. This set of passages, known as the Dead Dobbin Series, is about 350 metres (1,150 ft) long.

Rumbling Beck Cave is the source of the water that enters the entrance shaft 8 metres (26 ft) below the surface at the east end. The normal entrance is where the stream sinks 50 metres (160 ft) east of the Rumbling Hole. The main passage starts off as a crawl, but develops into a trench before reaching the shaft. A roof passage starting some 20 metres (66 ft) from the end leads to an alternative window in the shaft. Rumbling Beck Cave is about 100 metres (330 ft) long.

== Geology and hydrology ==
The cave is a solutional cave formed in Visean Great Scar limestone from the Mississippian Series of the Carboniferous period. Its development has been largely determined by the same vertical fault that may be observed in the nearby Death's Head Hole and Big Meanie. The stream flowing through the cave enters Lost Johns' Cave as a tributary, and eventually emerges from the Leck Beck Head spring in Ease Gill. It is thought that the current hydrology is relatively recent, and that some 350,000 years ago Rumbling Hole was a major sink that took water into now-blocked passages at the north end of the shaft, through East Passage and West Passage in Death's Head Hole and the passages associated with Glasfurds Chamber in Gavel Pot, and hence to a resurgence in the Leck Beck valley some 100 metres (330 ft) above the current resurgence which is now covered with glacial till.

== History ==
Rumbling Hole was mentioned in 1842 by Jonathan Otley in his A Descriptive Guide to the English Lakes, and Adjacent Mountains. Balderstone described the entrance shaft in detail in 1881 in Ingleton – Bygone and Present, and plumbed it at 150 feet (46 m). He thought it an impressive place:

"There lay an abysmal gulf most certainly; but its head was festooned with long and trailing, or rather pendant locks of ivy. One could have wished to have been so beauteously enwreathed. The verge was adorned with holly, hawthorn, and bilberry, whilst rocks and ledges were carpetted with moss, polypody, blechnum, and oxalis, as well as other plants"

The first descent of the entrance shaft was by Yorkshire Ramblers' Club in 1899, but they reported that the outlet finished in a pool. In 1926 a team from the same club penetrated the outlet fissure for some distance, but were discouraged by the poor weather. In 1931 a return trip saw the first of the underground pitches descended, and the first complete descent was made in June 1932. The bottom passage was forced through to Lost Johns' Cave by a Lancaster University Speleological Society team in 1985. The Dead Dobbin Series was explored by the Misty Mountain Mud Miners in 2007.
