= Ireby Fell Cavern =

Cave in Lancashire, England

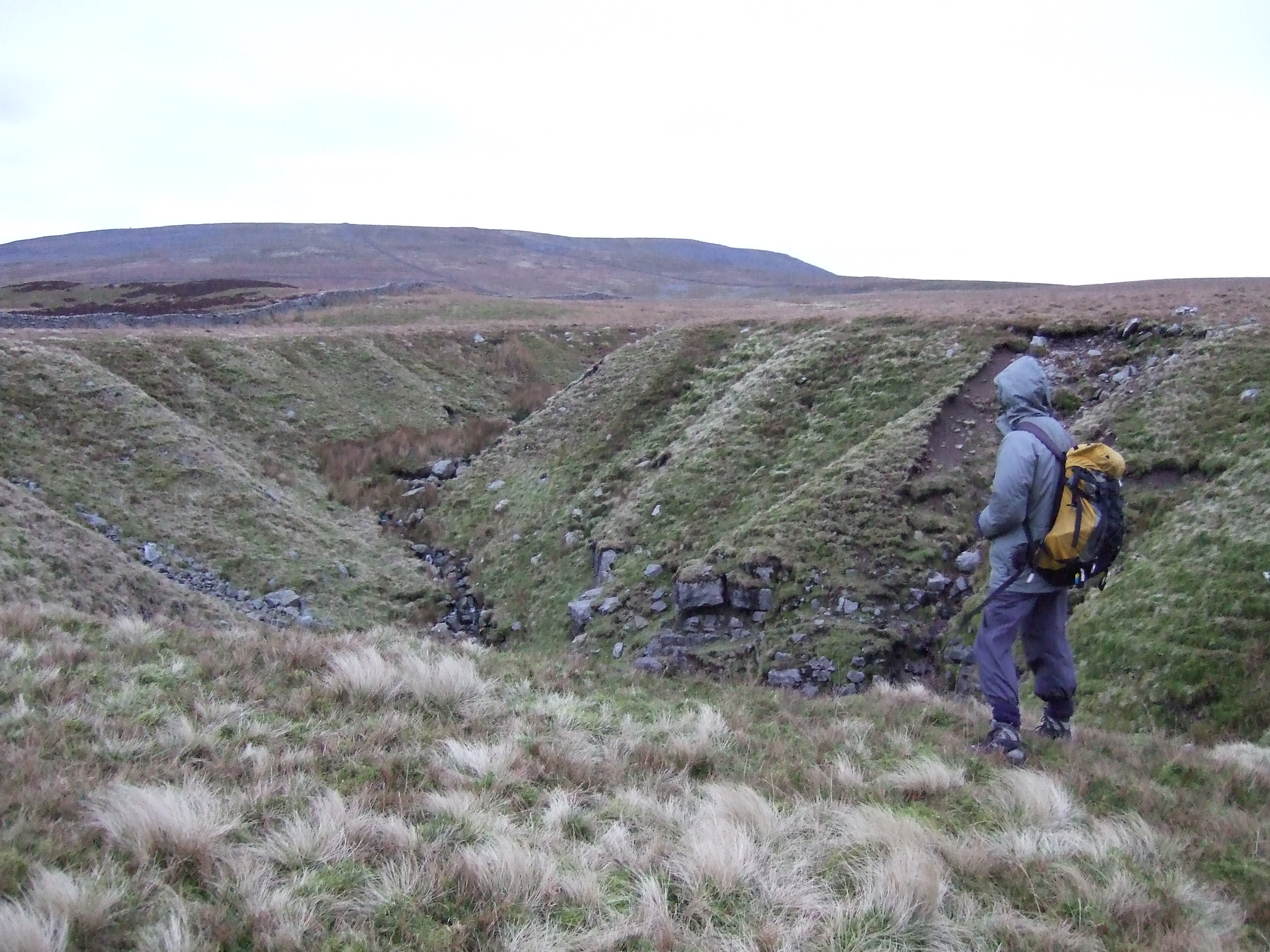
- Looking north across entrance sink hole

- Location within Yorkshire Dales
- Location: Leck Fell, Lancashire, England
- OS grid: SD 6737 7734
- Coordinates: 54°11′27″N 2°30′05″W
- Depth: 128 metres (420 ft)
- Length: 4,600 metres (15,100 ft)
- Discovery: 1949
- Geology: Limestone
- Entrances: 1
- Access: Free
- Cave survey: cavemaps.org
- BRAC grade: 4

Ireby Fell Cavern is a cave system on Ireby Fell, Lancashire, England, near the border with North Yorkshire. It is a segment of the Three Counties System, linking the Rift Pot system to the south with Notts Pot to the north.

This popular cave starts with a pitch series that eventually opens out into a very large series of dry sandy passages.

The entrance is a vertical concrete pipe at the bottom of a shakehole that was last shored up in 2006. The traditional route is down three pitches (Ding, Dong, and Bell), but there are several alternative routes. All may become impassable in wet weather. After many metres of rift passage is Well Pitch which accesses the main lower sandy passages known as Duke Street.

At the far end of Duke Street is Whirlpool chamber where a short sump (not free-diveable) gave access to cave divers into further passages known as Ireby II.

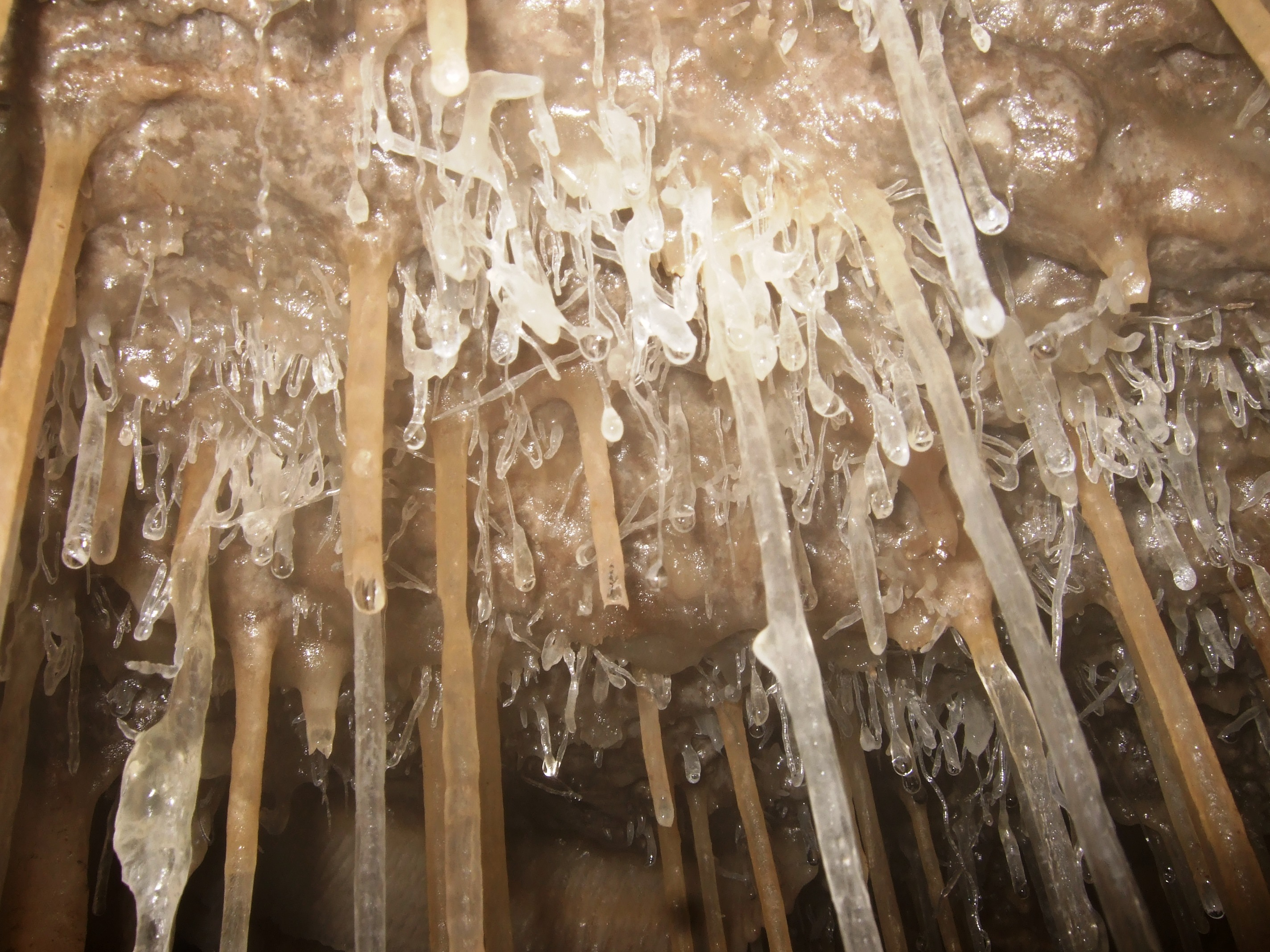
Helictites in Ireby Fell Cavern

In early 2007, a system involving a primitive hand pump and a mud dam to temporarily retain the water in an artificial lake in Duke Street allowed non-divers to enter this part of the cave. This facilitated the digging out of a passage in the roof of Whirlpool Chamber previously blocked by sand, to be dug out from both ends hence creating a bypass to the sump.

Digging has also forged a dry bypass to the sump via the aptly named Cripple Creek.

== History ==
The prominent depression of Ireby Fell was marked as "The Cavern" on the first (1847) issue of the Ordnance Survey maps, though the early explorers could see little justification for the name. Various digs were undertaken from 1932 onwards until in 1949 a small scar on the NW side of the shakehole gave access to a passage that reached the first pitch. Much of the cave was explored and surveyed down to the sump at the end of Duke Street. The cave entrance then became blocked in 1953 until it was reopened in 1963.
