= Ease Gill Caverns =

Cave system in Britain

Ease Gill Cave System
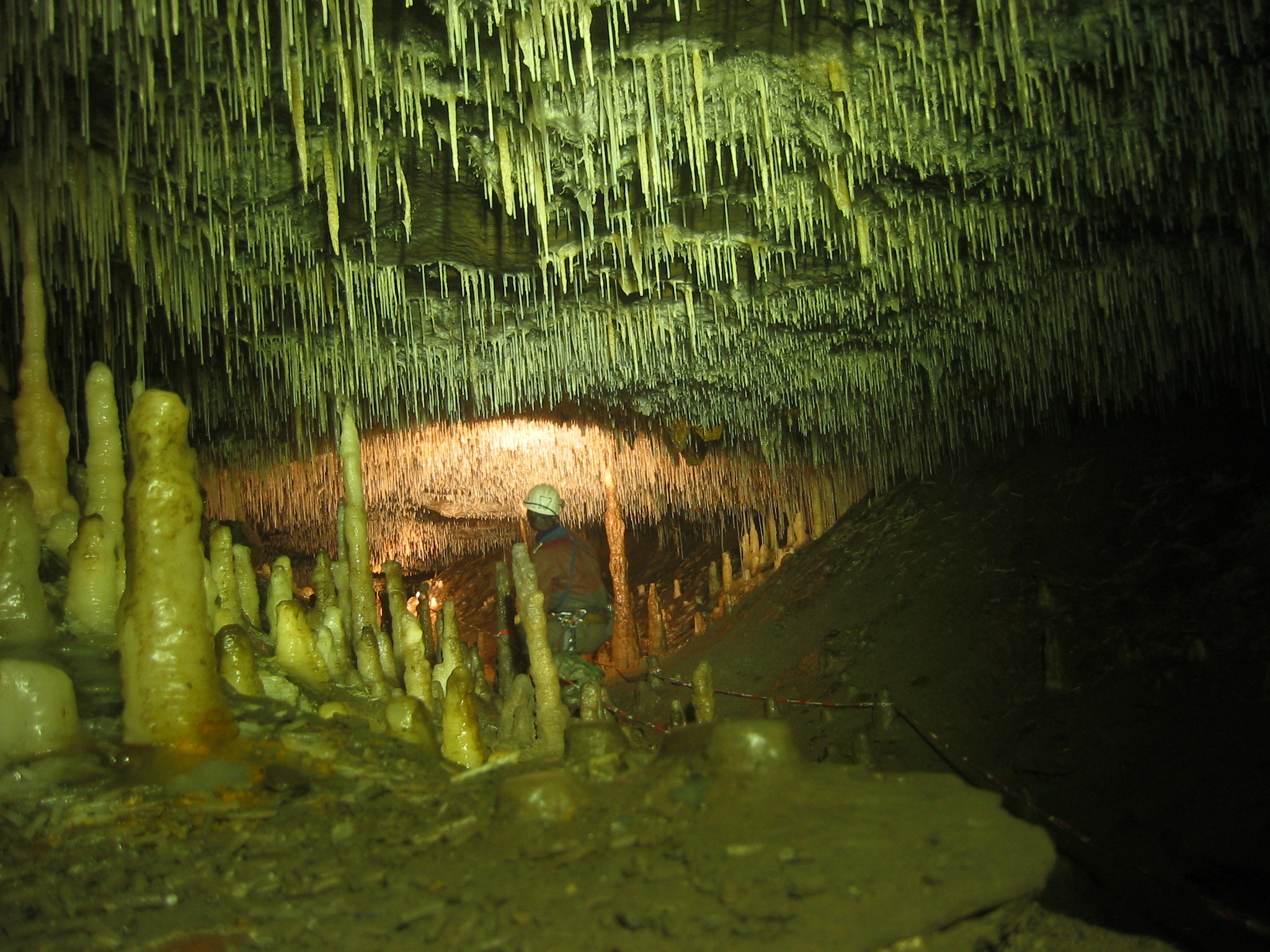
- Easter Grotto

- Location within Yorkshire Dales
- Location: Cumbria, UK
- OS grid: SD 6640 8072
- Coordinates: 54°13′16″N 2°31′00″W
- Depth: 137 metres (449 ft)
- Length: 66,000 metres (217,000 ft)
- Elevation: 294 metres (965 ft)
- Discovery: 1946
- Geology: Limestone
- Entrances: >10
- Cave survey: cavemaps.org

The Ease Gill Cave System is the longest, and most complex cave system in Britain as of 2011, with around 41 miles (66 km) of passages, including connections only passable by cave diving. It spans the valley between Leck Fell and Casterton Fell. The water resurges into Leck Beck.

The first-discovered entrance, Lancaster Hole, was found by George Cornes and Bill Taylor on 29 September 1946. A small draughting opening on Casterton Fell, Cumbria, opened immediately onto a 110-foot (34 m) shaft. Passages from the base of the shaft were explored over the succeeding weeks and months by members of the British Speleological Association, including Jim Eyre. The underground course of the Ease Gill (the local master cave) and high-level fossil passages above it were found and followed upstream to a series of complex inlet passages. In succeeding years, these have been connected to surface caves, including Top Sinks, County Pot and Pool Sink.

The cave passages adjoining the Ease Gill main streamway were connected to Link Pot and Pippikin Pot in 1978, and Pippikin was itself connected to Lost Johns' Cave by diving in 1989.

With its many entrances, the Ease Gill system offers cavers a wide variety of through trips; the Ease Gill streamway is regarded as one of the finest in the UK.

== Entrances ==
Entrances include:

- Top Sink
- Pool Sink
- The Borehole
- Slit Sinks
- Wretched Rabbit
- Corner Sink
- County Pot
- Cow Dubs II
- Cow Pot
- Lancaster Hole
- Link Pot
- Mistral Hole
- Pippikin Pot
- Bull Pot of the Witches

== Bibliography ==
- Aspin, J.; Gemmell, A.; Jowett, A. (1952). The Caves of Upper Easegill. Northern Pennine Club, Greenclose House, Clapham, Lancaster LA2 8HW, UK. Archived from the original on 14 September 2005.
- Waltham, A.C.; Simms, M.J.; Farrant, A.R.; Goldie, H.S. (1997). Karst and Caves of Great Britain. Chapman & Hall, 2-6 Boundary Row, London SE1 8HN, UK. pp. 29–38. ISBN 0-412-78860-8.
