= Jim Eyre (caver) =

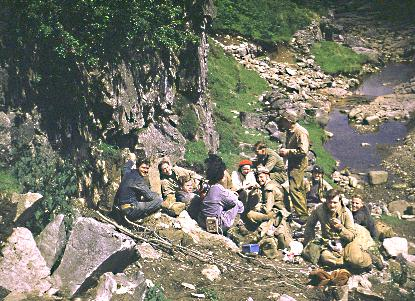
Jim Eyre (second left) outside County Pot in 1955 during the early exploration of Ease Gill Caverns

Jim Eyre (1925–2008) was a British caver, known for being one of the first European cavers to explore the caves of Asia. In 1946 in Lancaster, Eyre helped to found the Red Rose Cave and Pot Hole Club, where he was prominent in the earliest exploration of the Ease Gill Caverns.

== Life and career ==
Eyre was born in Kent, and his family moved to Lancaster while he was young.

Eyre was also a known author of adventure literature. Two early books, It's Only a Game and The Game Goes On, included more than 160 photographs, and cartoons of his characteristically knobbly-kneed explorers. His 1961 autobiography, The Cave Explorers, sold out. Half a dozen other books have followed, including Race Against Time: A History of the Cave Rescue Organisation about the team based in Clapham, North Yorkshire.

Eyre was well known as an active member of the Cave Rescue Organisation, based in North Yorkshire, and he took a major role during the Mossdale Caverns tragedy.

He died in 2008, aged 83.

== Bibliography ==
The Cave Explorers, 1981

Race Against Time: A History of the Cave Rescue Organisation, 1988

The Ease Gill System: Forty Years of Exploration, 1989

It's Only a Game, 2004

The Game Goes On, 2009

== See also ==
- Caving in the United Kingdom
