= Three Counties System =

Cave system in England

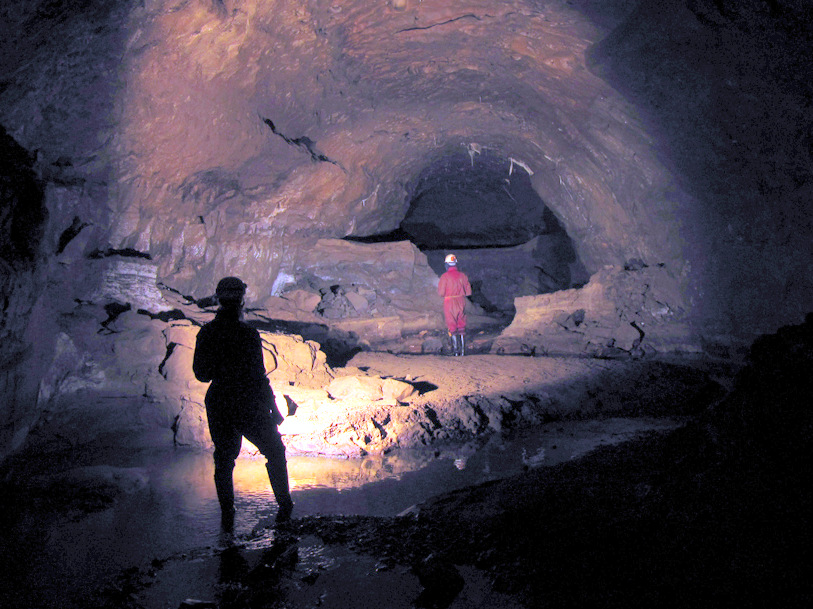
- Duke Street in Ireby Fell Cavern II

- Location within Yorkshire Dales
- Location: North-West England
- Coordinates: 54°12′25″N 2°30′23″W
- Depth: 253 metres (830 ft)
- Length: about 90 kilometres (56 mi)
- Geology: Carboniferous limestone
- Entrances: 56
- Difficulty: Various
- Hazards: Various
- Access: Various

The Three Counties System is a set of inter-connected limestone solutional cave systems spanning the borders of Cumbria, Lancashire and North Yorkshire in the north of England. The possibility of connecting a number of discrete cave systems in the area to create a single super-system that spans the county borders was first proposed by Dave Brook in 1968, and it was achieved in 2011. The system is currently about 90 kilometres (56 mi) long, making it the longest in the UK and the thirty-fourth longest in the world, and there continues to be scope for considerably extending the system.

== Description ==
The Three Counties System's most southerly entrance is currently North by North End Pot (54.183628°N 2.487239°W, NGR SD 6830 7654) on the northerly flank of Kingsdale in North Yorkshire, and the most northerly entrance is currently Bull Pot of the Witches (54.226398°N 2.519514°W, NGR SD 6623 8131) beneath Barbon Low Fell in Cumbria – a distance of over 5.2 kilometres (3.2 mi). Between the two, the system passes beneath Leck Fell which is in Lancashire.

The system runs mainly north–south, its western extent being limited by the Craven Fault which truncates the limestone exposure, and the eastern extent where the limestones are conformable overlain by younger rocks. Streams flow from the higher topography from the east and sink into swallet holes at the edge of the limestone. The Three Counties System contains a number of major subterranean streams, all of which combine to resurge at Leck Beck Head above Cowan Bridge.

At the northern end, swallets in Barbondale close to the Dent Fault drain southwest through Bull Pot of the Witches, and the water enters the Ease Gill Caverns system in Lancaster Hole; most of Ease Gill Beck to the south drains into the extensive Ease Gill Caverns, although some drains into Link Pot and thus into the bottom of Pippikin Pot; most of Leck Fell drains into the Leck Fell Master Cave, which is part of Lost Johns' Cave, although some drains into Gavel Pot, and some into Notts Pot; Ireby Fell in the south drains into Notts Pot. All these streams eventually reach the phreatic zone where exploration is only possible by cave diving. Some small streams in the south of The Three Counties System are known to resurge at Keld Head in Kingsdale, the next valley to the south.

The system is very complex, with sections formed at different times when the landscape topography and drainage patterns were different from today. Some of the system is believed to pre-date the Anglian stage which started at about 478 ka, with one stalagmite in Lancaster Hole being dated to over 350,000 years old, whilst other sections are still being formed today. Waltham has identified five distinct phases of development. The Leck Beck Catchment Area Site of Special Scientific Interest, which is based around the catchment area of the Three Counties System, states in its reason for notification: "The scale and variety of the caves makes this a most important site for the study of surface and underground landform development over a long period of the recent past." It is the interconnections between the sections that are the key to the existence of the super-system.

The Three Counties System is 253 metres (830 ft) deep. The highest point is the entrance to Large Pot which is at an altitude of 402 metres (1,319 ft), and the lowest point is in Gavel Pot where the upstream sump has been dived to a depth of −64 metres (−210 ft), an altitude of 149 metres (489 ft).

== Major cave systems ==
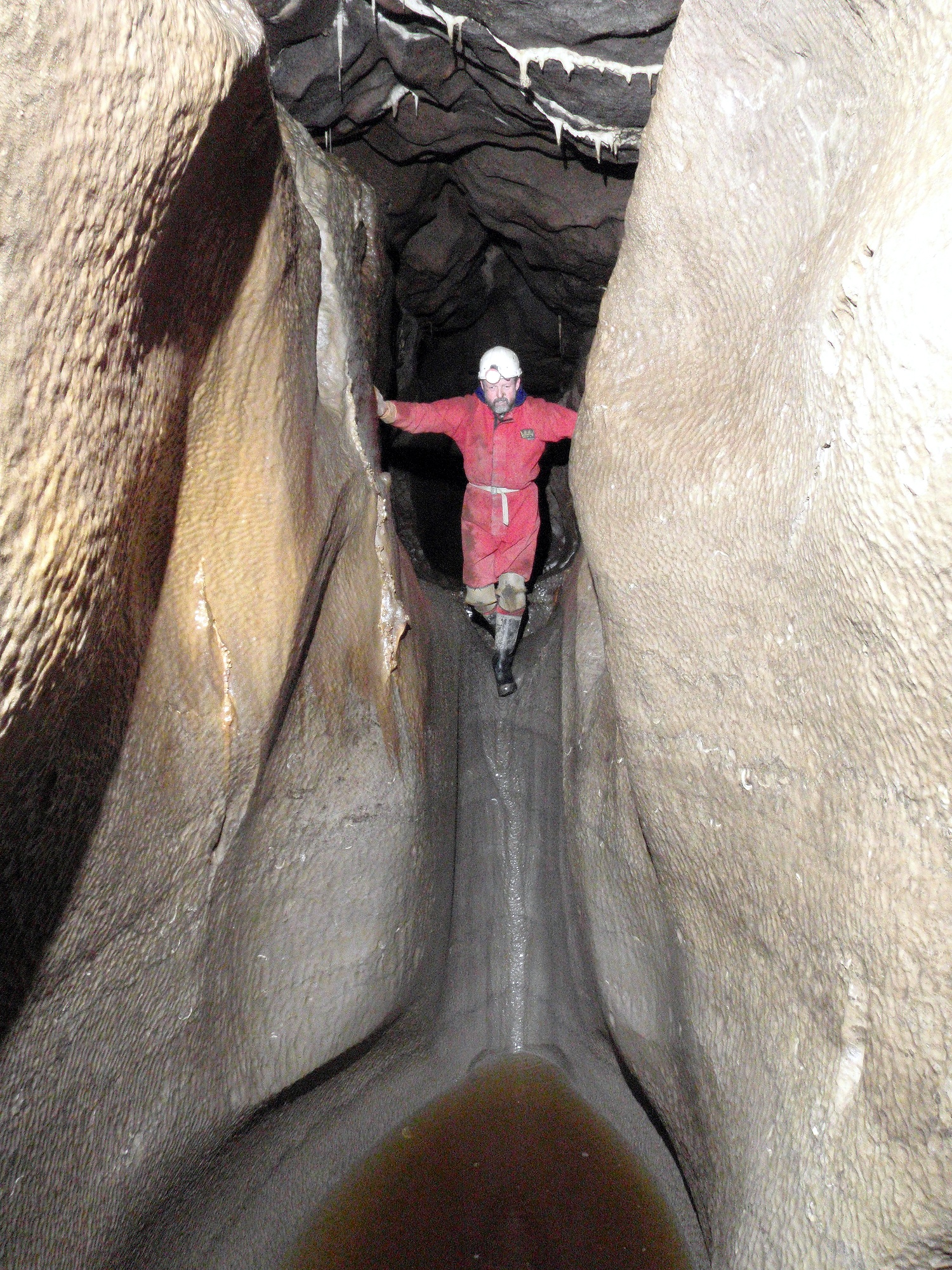
Wilf Taylor's Passage, Lancaster Hole

The Three Counties System comprises a number of smaller cave systems, some with multiple entrances. Whether or not a particular cave qualifies as a system in its own right is somewhat arbitrary, and arguments can be made for excluding some and including others. Running broadly from south to north, the systems include:

- Large Pot – Rift Pot system – connects into Ireby Fell Cavern.
- Low Douk – links into Rift Pot.
- Ireby Fell Cavern – links into Rift Pot, and to Notts Pot by diving.
- Notts Pot – Notts I links to Ireby and Notts II by diving, and thence into Lost Johns' Cave.
- Lost Johns' Cave – links to Notts II, and to Gavel Pot and Witches II by diving.
- Short Drop Cave – Gavel Pot System – links to Lost Johns' Cave by diving.
- Death's Head Hole – Long Drop Cave – links to Lost Johns' Cave.
- Rumbling Hole – links to Lost Johns' Cave.
- Pippikin Pot – links to Ease Gill Caverns, and to Witches Cave by diving.
- Ease Gill Caverns – links to Pippikin Pot, and to Bull Pot of Witches by diving.
- Bull Pot of the Witches – links to Ease Gill Caverns by diving.
- Leck Beck Head – Witches Cave – links to Pippikin Pot by diving.

== History ==
Most of the individual systems that make up the Three Counties System had been explored to a greater or lesser extent a long time before the possibility of an extended system was mooted. Thus Lost Johns' Cave was explored by the Yorkshire Ramblers' Club in the 1920s, Ease Gill Caverns by a number of caving clubs from the time of the original discovery of Lancaster Hole in 1946, and Ireby Fell Cavern in 1949.

The existence for the Three Counties System was first mooted by Dave Brook in 1968, when he proposed that the many fragmented systems stretching from Barbondale in the north to Kingsdale in the south could be part of a much larger system. Over the next 43 years, many discoveries by many cavers gradually knitted the fragments together, but the two most significant dates were 30 May 2010 when Rift Pot was connected to Ireby Fell Cavern, linking systems of North Yorkshire and Lancashire for the first time, and 6 November 2011, when Notts II was linked to Lost Johns' Cave, which was when the northern part of the system (including caves in Cumbria) was connected to the southern part of the system (including caves in Lancashire).

Following months of preparatory work, and with the support of over fifty cavers, the first complete traverse of the Three Counties System, between Large Pot in North Yorkshire and Top Sink in Cumbria, was completed by Chris Jewell and Jason Mallinson over the weekend of 25–26 September 2021. In all, the two traversed 10.8 kilometres (6.7 mi) of passage, of which 2.2 kilometres (1.4 mi) were underwater, in 17½ hours.

=== Fatalities ===
Sixteen cavers have lost their lives in the Three Counties System. These fatalities are listed in the chronology below.

=== Chronology ===
This chronology includes the date of the original explorations of the major systems; the dates when two systems were linked; and deaths that have occurred in the system.

- 1885: Gavel Pot explored upstream into Short Drop Cave.
- 1898: Deaths' Head Hole fully descended.
- 1898: Short Drop Cave explored and connected to Gavel Pot.
- 1899: Bull Pot of the Witches explored.

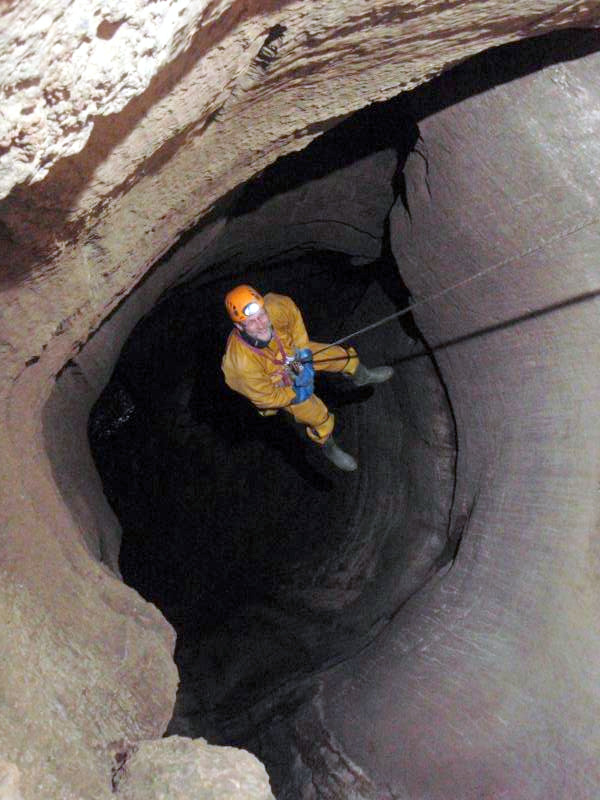
A caver descending a 25-metre (82 ft) shaft in Notts Pot

- 1928: Lost Johns' Cave first fully descended.
- 1932: Rumbling Hole first fully descended.
- 1946: Lancaster Hole – Ease Gill Caverns explorations began.
- 1946: Notts Pot explored.
- 1949: Ireby Fell Cavern explored.
- 1950: Boundary Pot explored.
- 1952: Oxford Pot opened, allowing easier access to Ease Gill Caverns.
- 1952: Top Sink, the top entrance to Ease Gill Caverns, first opened up.
- 1960: Cow Pot explored to Lancaster Hole.
- 1964: Alan Clegg died whilst diving in the Lancaster Hole terminal sump.
- 1965: Long Drop Cave fully descended.
- 1966: Bull Pot of the Witches connected to Lancaster Hole by diving, connecting the Ease Gill and Aygill drainage systems.
- 1969: Lyle Cavern, a high level fossil series, explored in Lost Johns' Cave. This was later linked to Notts II.
- 1968: Dave Brook first proposed the possibility of the Three Counties System.
- 1969: Duncan Glasfurd died as a result of a rock fall in Ease Gill Caverns.
- 1970: Gavel Pot fully descended.
- 1971: Earby Series explored in Lancaster Hole.
- 1975: Gavel Pot linked to Lost Johns' Cave by diving. linking two major drainage systems on Leck Fell.
- 1975: Stephen Hughes died as a result of a fall in Ireby Fell Cavern.
- 1976: Ireby Fell Cavern linked to Notts Pot by diving.
- 1978: Link Pot explored and connected with Pippikin Pot and Lancaster Hole, linking Leck Fell and Casterton Fell cave systems.
- 1980: Ian Plant died whilst diving in the upstream sump of Bull Pot of the Witches.
- 1981: Long Drop Cave connected to Death's Head Cave.
- 1982: Lost Pot, the upstream entrance to Lost Johns' Cave, explored, but then collapsed.
- 1982: John Martin died as a result of a fall in Ireby Fell Cavern.
- 1982: Large Pot explored.
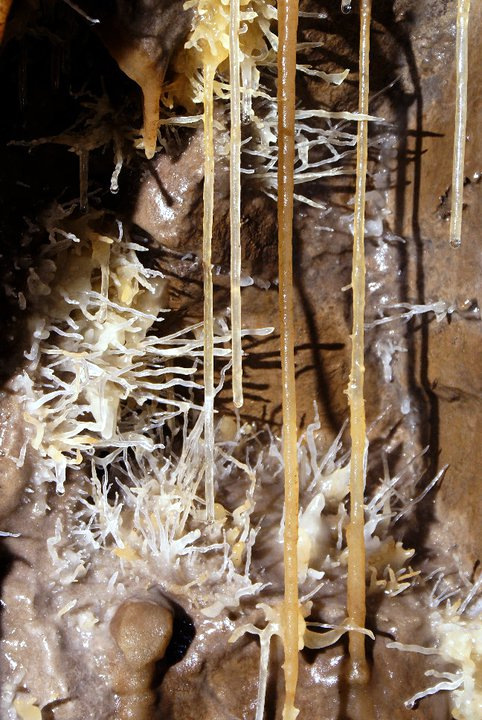
  Calcite formations in Witches II cave.
- 1984: Rift Pot explored, and connected to Large Pot.
- 1985: Rumbling Hole connected to Lost Johns' Cave.
- 1985: David James drowned in Lancaster Hole.
- 1985: Notts II discovered by diving.
- 1988: Janet Barnfield, Michael Preece, and David Simpson died as a result of a rockfall in Ease Gill Caverns.
- 1989: Sylvester Pot explored and connected to Ease Gill Caverns.
- 1989: Pippikin linked to Gavel Pot by diving, connecting two important Leck Fell drainage systems.
- 1994: Paul Lyons died as the result of a rock fall in Lost Johns' Cave.
- 1997: Michael Jeffries died as the result of a fall in Lancaster Hole.
- 1997: Witches Cave connected to Leck Beck Head and Pippikin Pot by diving.
- 2000: Howard Rothwell drowned in Lancaster Hole.
- 2000: Committee Pot dug into Notts II, allowing ready access for more intensive exploration.
- 2001: Julian Carrol and Ray Lea drowned in Ireby Fell Cavern.
- 2004: Paula Szajnowska died as the result of a fall in Notts Pot.
- 2010: Ireby Fell Cavern linked to Rift Pot, connecting caves of North Yorkshire with caves in Lancashire.
- 2011: Notts II connected to Lyle Cavern in Lost Johns' Cave, integrating two important Leck Fell drainage systems, and making the Three Counties System a reality.
- 2011: Death's Head Hole connected to Lost Johns' Cave.
- 2012: Boundary Pot connected to Ease Gill Caverns.
- 2013: Low Douk is connected to Rift Pot.
- 2020: Simon Halliday died whilst diving in Lancaster Hole terminal sump.
- 2021: First complete traverse of the Three Counties System successfully undertaken.
- 2024: North by North End Pot connected to Large Pot.

== Future prospects ==
Although Dave Brook's vision for the Three Counties System came to fruition in 2011, there is considerable scope for extending it in both directions. To the north in Barbondale, Aygill Caverns is known to drain into Bull Pot of the Witches, but a route through the underwater passages has yet to be negotiated. This would add 2.5 kilometres (1.6 mi) to the total system. Further north still, a major abandoned route in Aygill Caverns, known as New Year Passage, heads up the Barbondale valley, and may connect with other known caves. To the south, explorations in Large Pot have extended the current system to within 500 metres (1,600 ft) of Kingsdale Beck. Marble Steps, a major active system with large fossil fragments, could well be connected to Rift Pot. Marble Steps, some of Large Pot, and Low Douk Cave are all known to drain to Keld Head – a connection by diving would integrate both the West Kingsdale System (9 kilometres (5.6 mi) long) and the East Kingsdale System (7 kilometres (4.3 mi) long) into the system.

== See also ==
- Caving in the United Kingdom
- List of longest caves

== Sources ==
- Eyre, Jim; Frankland, John (1988). Race Against Time. Dent, Sedbergh: Lyon Equipment (Books). ISBN 0950687448.
