= Lost Johns' Cave =

Cave in Lancashire, England

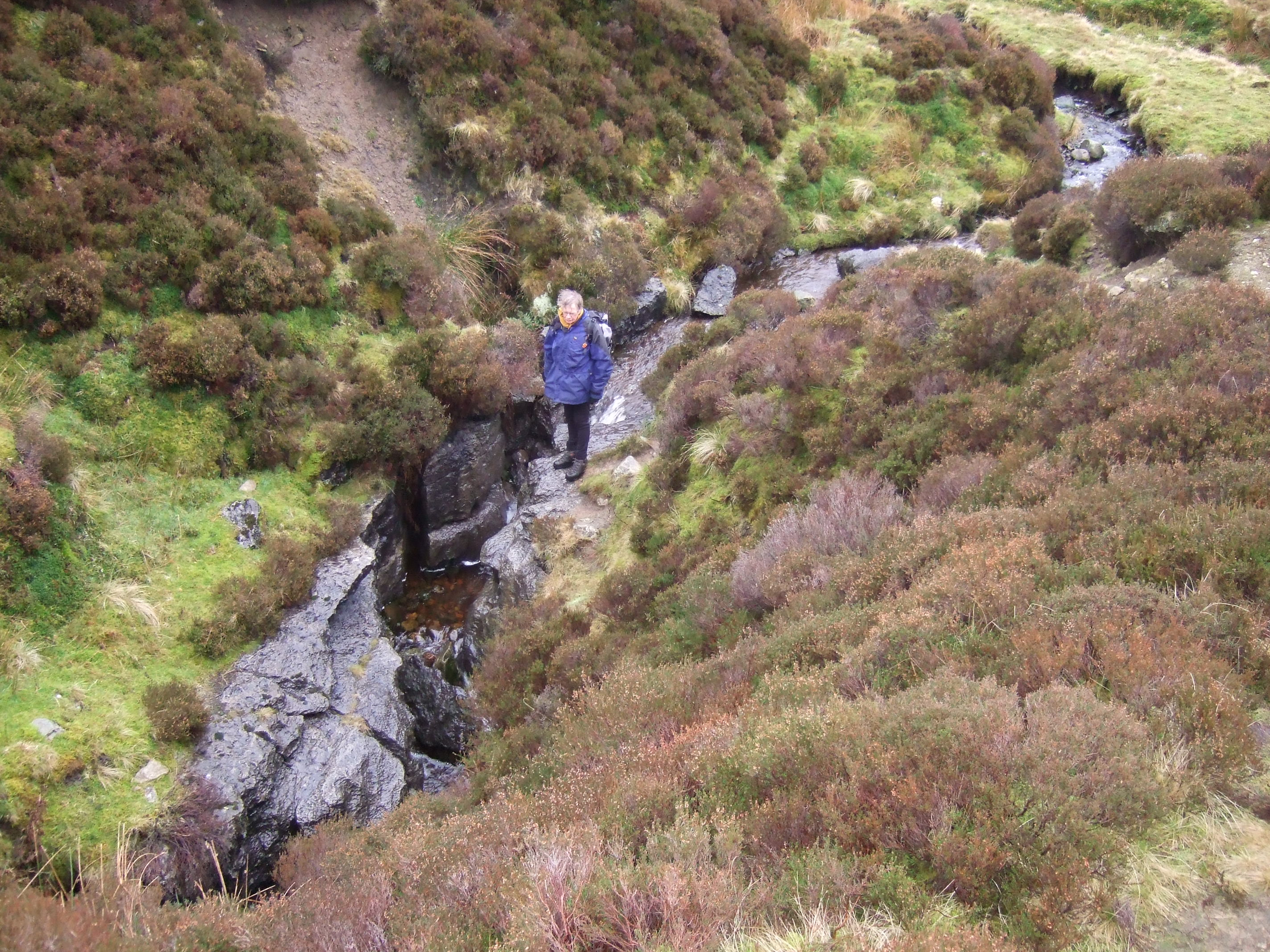
- Stream leading into the main entrance

- Location within Yorkshire Dales
- Location: Leck Fell, Lancashire, England
- OS grid: SD670786
- Coordinates: 54°12′09″N 2°30′22″W
- Depth: 211 metres (692 ft)
- Length: 4.8 kilometres (3.0 mi)
- Discovery: bottomed 1928
- Geology: Carboniferous limestone
- Entrances: 8
- Access: Unrestricted
- Cave survey: cavemaps.org

Lost Johns' Cave is an extensive cave system on Leck Fell, Lancashire, England. With its three major vertical routes (Dome Route, Centipede Route and Monastery Route) it is a popular place to practise single-rope technique (SRT) because of the opportunity for exchange trips. Also it can be safely visited on wet days because many of the pitches can be rigged out of the water. It is an important part of the Three Counties System.

All routes converge on Battleaxe Streamway. From here the usual route is to shuffle along Battleaxe Traverse at a high level protected by rope, and descend a safe distance from the water. From here a short passage and another pitch leads to Groundsheet Junction where the Leck Fell Master Cave is entered.

Upstream leads to the high-level passages of Lyle Cavern and a connection with the Notts Pot system. The main streamway continues to the NPC Avens, where Boxhead Pot and It's a Cracker enter the system.

Downstream leads through several neck-deep pools past several inlets, including one which links with Rumbling Hole, and another which links to Death's Head Hole, to a sump which, after 800 metres (2,600 ft), connects with Pippikin Pot.

== In popular culture ==
- An episode of the horror fiction podcast The Magnus Archives, titled Lost John's Cave, is set within the cave system.

== See also ==
- Long Drop Cave
- Lost Pot
