= Leck Fell =

Coordinates: 54.21196°N 2.50903°W

Leck Beck Head Catchment Area
- Site of Special Scientific Interest
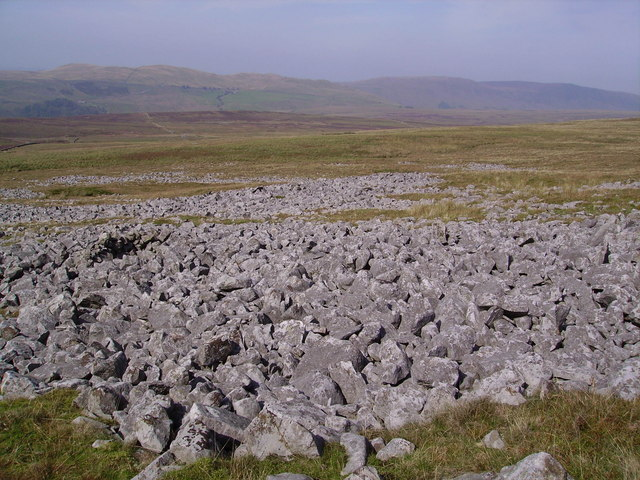

- Location in Lancashire Location in the City of Lancaster district
- Location of Leck Beck Head Catchment Area.
- Area of search: Cumbria, Lancashire
- Grid reference: SD669797
- Interest: Geological
- Area: 703.1 hectares (1,737 acres)
- Notification date: 1959
- Location map: English Nature

Leck Fell is a Site of Special Scientific Interest in Lancashire, England. An area of typically heavily grazed open moorland of rough grass and remnant patches of heather with little or no tree cover, it is characterised by the virtual absence of surface drainage and an extensive subterranean drainage network resulting in cave systems and numerous sinkholes. It surrounds the high point of Gragareth 627 metres (2,057 ft) between Leck Beck and Kingsdale.

Since 1 August 2016, Leck Fell has been part of the Yorkshire Dales National Park.

== The SSSI ==
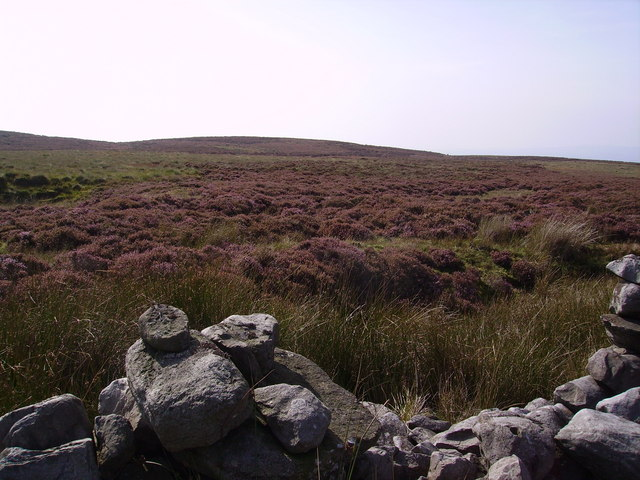
Old wall on Leck Fell

This site consists of a network of cave systems and their catchment areas, with Ease Gill Caverns being the longest cave system in Britain. There are fourteen major sinkholes through which surface water enters the system, with water returning to the surface at Leck Beck Head. The botanical interest of the site is due to the underlying Carboniferous Limestone, which appears above ground as features such as crags, limestone pavements, gorges and potholes. The pasturing of animals, along with changes in the climate in the later Bronze Age, contributed to deforestation of the open fell sides and the development of hill peat deposits. The present landscape is dominated by long straight enclosure walls of late 18th or 19th century date.

== Ecology ==
At Easegill, the limestone cliffs support rigid buckler fern, limestone polypody and mossy saxifrage. Downstream from here, in a steep wooded gorge, there are eleven species of fern and such plants as wood forget-me-not, hairy rock-cress, wall lettuce, sanicle and whitlow grass. In contrast, the more acid rock at Aygill supports wood rush, hard fern and beech fern. The steep slopes around some potholes have similar "woodland"-type flora. In some places there are limestone pavements, in whose cracks and fissures grow ferns and the unusual subshrub baneberry, out of reach of grazing sheep.

== Cave systems ==
The 87-kilometre (54 mi) Three Counties System, which extends from Kingsdale to Barbondale, includes a number of important cave systems lying beneath Leck Fell. These include:

- Death's Head Hole
- Long Drop Cave
- Lost Johns' Cave
- Notts Pot
- Rumbling Hole
- Short Drop Cave - Gavel Pot System

A formal permitting system operates for access to most of the caves.
