= Leck Beck =

River in Cumbria and Lancashire, England

Coordinates: 54°10′N 2°36′W

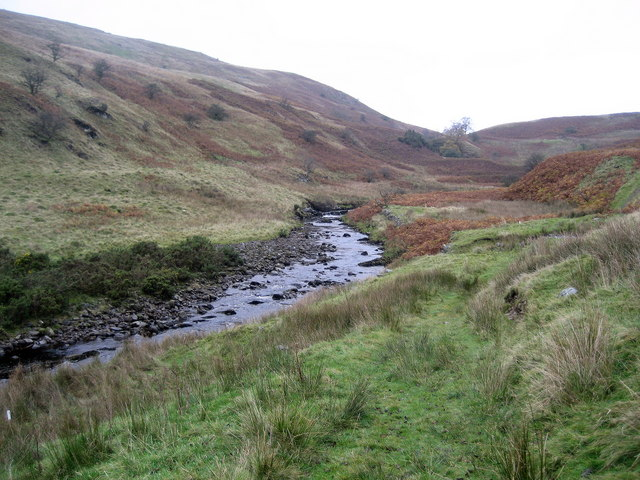

Location
- Country: United Kingdom
- Part: England
- County: Lancashire, Cumbria

Physical characteristics
- Source: Crag Hill
- Mouth: Confluence with River Lune

Leck Beck is a watercourse in Lancashire with its source on Crag Hill in Cumbria, between Leck Fell and Casterton Fell.

For several kilometres near the start of its course, the water flows into the Ease Gill Cave System, part of The Three Counties System, the longest cave system in Britain (and 26th longest in the world) via 14 major sink holes, to resurge at a major spring at Leck Beck Head.

The rising of Leck Beck Head SD660 800 was dived extensively in the 1980s and required underwater digging and the use of an air chisel to make progress. The overflow for this rising, Witches Cave (Yorkshire), has been dived through a 300m sump into Witches II. A dry entrance was dug into Witches II from the surface in 2010.

The beck flows through Leck, Cowan Bridge and Overtown, before joining the River Lune near Nether Burrow.
