= Notts Pot =

Cave in Lancashire, England

Coordinates: 54.1949°N 2.5056°W

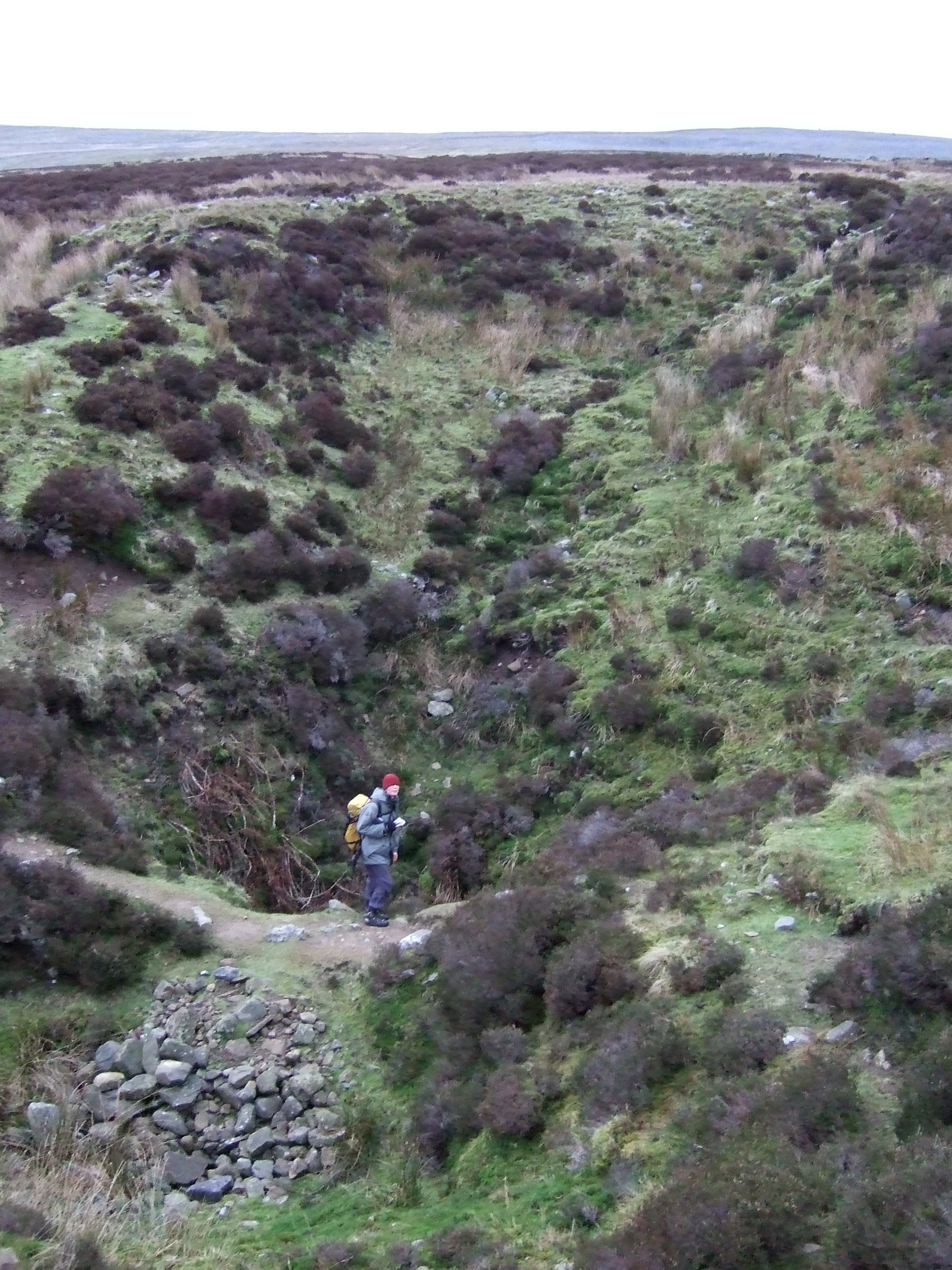
- Entrance to Notts Pot
- Interactive map of Notts Pot
- Location: Leck Fell, Lancashire, UK
- Depth: 157 metres (515 ft)
- Length: 5.2 kilometres (3.2 mi)
- Discovery: 1946
- Geology: Limestone
- Difficulty: Grade III-IV

Notts Pot is cave system on Leck Fell, Lancashire, England. It is described as 'the most concentrated vertical maze in Britain'.
