= List of caves in the United Kingdom =

This is an incomplete list of caves in the United Kingdom, including information on the largest and deepest caves in the UK.

== Longest, deepest and largest ==
The longest cave system in the UK is the Three Counties System in the Yorkshire Dales, with 86.7 km (53.9 mi) of passageways. It includes the Ease Gill system, the Notts Pot / Ireby Fell Cavern system, the Lost Johns' Cave system, and the Pippikin Pot system, all of which are connected.

- The deepest cave in Wales and the UK is Ogof Ffynnon Ddu, 274.5 metres (901 ft) deep and containing around 50 km (31 mi) of passageways.
- The deepest cave in England is the Three Counties System which is 252 metres (827 ft) deep between the entrance of Large Pot, and the deepest point reached by diving in Gavel Pot.
- The deepest cave in Scotland is Uamh an Claonaite in Assynt, 110 metres (360 ft) deep.
- The deepest cave in Northern Ireland is Reyfad Pot in County Fermanagh, 193 metres (633 ft) deep.

A sea cave on the north side of Calder's Geo in Shetland was measured in 2014 at over 20 metres (66 ft) high and with a floor area of around 5,600 square metres (60,000 sq ft). This makes it the largest known cave chamber in the United Kingdom.

A chamber in Reservoir Hole, Cheddar Gorge called “The Frozen Deep” was discovered in 2012 and found to be 30 metres (98 ft) high and 60 metres (200 ft) long.

== List of Caves in the United Kingdom and Ireland ==
This is a list of all caves over 1km length and 60m depth in the United Kingdom after Wilton-Jones.

Cave	Length (km)	Depth (m)	Region
Three Counties System	86.619	253	Northern Dales
Ogof Draenen	70	151	South Wales
Ogof Ffynnon Ddu	60.644	309.5	South Wales
Agen Allwedd	32.8	160	South Wales
Ogof Daren Cilau System	28	232	South Wales
Kingsdale Master Cave	27	165	Northern Dales
Clearwell Caves	24	107	Forest Of Dean
Gaping Gill System	21	192	Northern Dales
Peak Cavern - Speedwell Cavern	17.75	248	Peak District
Dan-Yr-Ogof	16	150	South Wales
Slaughter Stream Cave	14	100	Forest Of Dean
Hudgill Burn Mine Caverns	13.244	< 60	Northern Dales
Marble Arch - Upper Cradle - Lower Cradle - Prod's Pot - Cascades Rising	11.5	< 60	Co. Fermanagh
Mossdale Caverns	10.5	60	Northern Dales
Lancliffe Pot	9.6	116	Northern Dales
Swildon's Hole	9.41	167	Mendip
Carno	8.9	63	South Wales
Little Neath River Cave	8.8	125	South Wales
Ogof Craig A Ffynnon	8	115	South Wales
St. Cuthbert's Swallet	7.103	145	Mendip
The Goyden System	7.1	< 60	Northern Dales
Gingling Hole	6.9	177	Northern Dales
Reyfad - Pollnacrom - Polltullybrack	6.7	193	Co. Fermanagh
White Scar Cave	6.5	< 60	Northern Dales
Mongo Gill Hole - Stump Cross Caverns	5.8	< 60	Northern Dales
Charterhouse Cave	5.218	228	Mendip
Penyghent Pot	5.2	196	Northern Dales
Giants Hole - Oxlow Caverns	5.12	211	Peak District
Shannon Cave - Polltullyard	5	130	Co. Fermanagh
Bagshawe Cavern	5	75	Peak District
Dale Barn Cave	4.9	< 60	Northern Dales
Upper Flood Swallet	4.72	136	Mendip
Meregill - Roaring Hole	4.6	181	Northern Dales
Magnetometer Pot	4.6	91	Northern Dales
Knock Fell Caverns	4.5	< 60	Northern Dales
Red Moss/Birkwith System	4.2	< 60	Northern Dales
Ogof Llyn Parc	4	110	North Wales
Miss Graces Lane Swallet	4	72	Forest Of Dean
Dub Cote Cave	4	< 60	Northern Dales
Ogof Llyn Du - Ogof Dydd Braf	4	< 60	North Wales
Noon's Hole - Arch Cave	3.7	108	Co. Fermanagh
Dow Cave - Providence Pot	3.7	< 60	Northern Dales
Wookey Hole	3.66	182	Mendip
Baker's Pit - Reeds	3.631	< 60	Devon
Birks Fell Cave	3.6	142	Northern Dales
Boreham Cave	3.6	< 60	Northern Dales
Gough's Cave	3.405	115	Mendip
Otter Hole	3.352	< 60	South Wales
Carlswark Cavern	3.243	61	Peak District
Fairy Holes	3.2	< 60	Northern Dales
Pollaraftra	3.13	73	Co. Fermanagh
Uamh An Claonaite	2.868	110	Assynt
Ibbeth Peril - Upper Hackergill Caves	2.803	< 60	Northern Dales
Eastwater Cavern	2.8	160	Mendip
Knotlow Cavern	2.6	76	Peak District
Lathkill Head Cave - Ricklow Cave	2.58	< 60	Peak District
Porth yr Ogof	2.53	< 60	South Wales
Boho Caves	2.5	< 60	Co. Fermanagh
Excalibur Pot	2.5	< 60	North York
Ogof T1	2.5	< 60	South Wales
Alum Pot System	2.454	129	Northern Dales
Aygill Caverns	2.438	< 60	Northern Dales
Sleets Gill Cave	2.4	76	Northern Dales
Hurtle Pot - Jingle Pot System	2.37	64	Northern Dales
Stoke Lane Slocker	2.25	< 60	Mendip
Robinsons' Pot	2.2	< 60	Northern Dales
Reservoir Hole	2.196	131	Mendip
Tunnel Cave	2.135	145	South Wales
Black Keld	2.115	< 60	Northern Dales
Ogof Hesp Alyn	2	97	North Wales
Cliff Force Cave	2	< 60	Northern Dales
GB Cave	1.95	134	Mendip
Dog Hole - Crystal Cave	1.95	< 60	Northern Dales
Smeltmill Beck Cave	1.9	< 60	Northern Dales
P8 (Jackpot)	1.8	70	Peak District
Blea Gill Cave	1.8	< 60	Northern Dales
Devis Hole Mine Caves - South and East Cave Series	1.791	< 60	Northern Dales
Joint Hole	1.77	< 60	Northern Dales
Ogof Afon Hepste	1.76	< 60	South Wales
Llanelly Quarry Pot	1.705	80	South Wales
Ayleburn Mine Cave	1.7	< 60	Northern Dales
Devis Hole Mine Caves - Central Maze	1.7	< 60	Northern Dales
Malham Cove Risings	1.7	< 60	Northern Dales
Great Douk Cave	1.676	< 60	Northern Dales
Longwood Swallet	1.65	175	Mendip
Redhouse Lane Swallet	1.615	< 60	Forest Of Dean
Ogof Tarddiad Rhymney	1.608	< 60	South Wales
Redmire Pot	1.6	117	Northern Dales
Llygad Llwchwr	1.6	< 60	South Wales
Spittle Croft Cave	1.6	< 60	Northern Dales
Goatchurch Cavern	1.532	63	Mendip
Tooth Cave	1.525	< 60	South Wales
Wigmore Swallet	1.52	113	Mendip
Long Kin East - Rift Pot	1.5	113	Northern Dales
Tullyhona Rising Cave	1.5	65	Co. Fermanagh
Allt Nan Uamh Stream Cave	1.5	< 60	Assynt
Ogof Cynnes	1.5	< 60	South Wales
Pollnagossan (Pollnadossan)	1.5	< 60	Co. Cavan
Scoska Cave	1.5	< 60	Northern Dales
Borrins Moor Cave	1.433	< 60	Northern Dales
Thrupe Lane Swallet	1.417	120	Mendip
Cnoc Nan Uamh	1.4	84	Assynt
Shatter Cave	1.373	< 60	Mendip
Eglwys Faen	1.34	< 60	South Wales
Blue John Caverns	1.324	90	Peak District
Tyning's Barrow Swallet	1.296	132	Mendip
Eglin's Hole	1.28	< 60	Northern Dales
Marble Steps Pot	1.273	131	Northern Dales
Tatham Wife Hole	1.219	155	Northern Dales
Big Sink Cave (or swallet)	1.2	126	Forest Of Dean
Pant Mawr Pot	1.2	97	South Wales
Bown Scar Cave	1.2	< 60	Northern Dales
Cherry Tree Hole	1.2	< 60	Northern Dales
Hagg Gill Pot	1.2	< 60	Northern Dales
White Keld	1.2	< 60	Northern Dales
Windegg Mine Caverns	1.2	< 60	Northern Dales
Manor Farm Swallet	1.17	179	Mendip
Fairy Cave - Hillier's Cave - Hillwithy Cave	1.17	< 60	Mendip
Crescent Pot	1.146	122	Northern Dales
Ogof Rhyd Sych	1.11	< 60	South Wales
Langstroth Pot	1.1	90	Northern Dales
Ogof Fawr	1.1	76	South Wales
Grabbers Cave	1.1	< 60	Northern Dales
Hugh's Moss Cave	1.1	< 60	Northern Dales
Pridhamsleigh Cavern	1.1	< 60	Devon
Water Icicle Close Cavern	1.1	< 60	Peak District
Yew Cogar Cave	1.1	< 60	Northern Dales
Little Hull Pot	1.097	110	Northern Dales
Heron Pot	1.097	< 60	Northern Dales
Ogof Pwll Swnd	1.075	76	South Wales
Dry Gill Cave	1.07	< 60	Northern Dales
Ogof Fechan	1.067	< 60	South Wales
Lower Cales Dale Cave	1.055	< 60	Peak District
Pikedaw Calamine Caverns	1.055	< 60	Northern Dales
Rowter Hole	1.044	140	Peak District
Hammer Pot	1.036	90	Northern Dales
Creevy Cave	1.024	< 60	Co. Monaghan
Ogof Ap Robert	1.015	90	South Wales
Lionel's Hole	1.006	< 60	Mendip
Barras End Mine Caverns	1	< 60	Northern Dales
Carrickbeg Rising Cave (Bunty Pot)	1	< 60	Co. Fermanagh
Kent's Cavern	1	< 60	Devon
Nidd Head North West Rising	1	< 60	Northern Dales
Ogof-Yr-Ardd	1	< 60	South Wales
Skirwith Cave	1	< 60	Northern Dales
Tub Hole	1	< 60	Northern Dales

== England ==
By English caving region.

=== Devon ===
See also Caves in Devon

- Ash Hole Cavern
- Bakers Pit, Buckfastleigh
- Chudleigh Cavern
- Kent's Cavern
- Kitley Show Cave
- Pridhamsleigh Cavern, Ashburton
- Reed's Cave

=== Mendip Hills ===
The following are all within Somerset unless otherwise stated. See also Caves of the Mendip Hills.

- Aveline's Hole
- Charterhouse Cave
- Cox's cave
- Eastwater Cavern
- GB Cave
- Goatchurch Cavern
- Gough's Cave
- Lamb Leer
- Longwood Swallet
- Manor Farm Swallet
- Pierre's Pot
- Reservoir Hole
- Rhino Rift
- Shatter Cave
- St Cuthbert's Swallet
- Stoke Lane Slocker
- Swildon's Hole
- Thrupe Lane Swallet
- Wookey Hole Caves

=== Peak District ===
The following are all within Derbyshire unless otherwise stated. See also List of caves in the Peak District and List of caves in Derbyshire.

- Blue John Cavern
- Great Masson Cavern
- Great Rutland Cavern
- Oxlow Cavern
- Peak Cavern
- Poole's Cavern
- Speedwell Cavern
- Thor's Cave, Staffordshire
- Titan
- Treak Cliff Cavern

=== Yorkshire Dales ===
- Alum Pot
- Aquamole Pot
- Bar Pot, Gaping Gill
- Big Meanie (See Death's Head Hole)
- Boxhead Pot
- The Buttertubs
- Coal Hole Entrance (See Short Drop Cave)
- Crackpot Cave
- Death's Head Hole
- Disappointment Pot, Gaping Gill
- Ease Gill Caverns
- Eden Sike Cave, Mallerstang
- Flood Entrance Pot, Gaping Gill
- Gaping Gill
- Gavel Pot
- Goyden Pot
- Great Douk Cave
- Ingleborough Cave
- It's a Cracker (See Lost Pot)
- Jib Tunnel
- Jingling Caves (See Jingling Pot)
- Jingling Pot
- Juniper Gulf
- Langcliffe Pot
- Long Churn Caves
- Long Drop Cave
- Long Kin East Cave
- Lost John's Cave
- Lost Pot
- Manchester Hole
- Marilyn, Gaping Gill (See Disappointment Pot)
- Mossdale Caverns
- Motley Pot, Gaping Gill (See Disappointment Pot)
- New Goyden Pot
- OBJ Pot, Gaping Gill (See Flood Entrance Pot)
- Oddmire Pot (See Langcliffe Pot)
- Rat Hole, Gaping Gill
- Rat Hole Sink, Gaping Gill (See Rat Hole)
- Rift Entrance (See Short Drop Cave)
- Rift Pot (see Long Kin East Cave)
- Rowten Pot
- Rumbling Beck Cave (See Rumbling Hole)
- Rumbling Hole
- Short Drop Cave
- Short Long Drop Cave (see Long Drop Cave)
- Simpson Pot
- Skirwith Cave
- Small Mammal Pot, Gaping Gill (See Bar Pot)
- Stile Pot, Gaping Gill (See Bar Pot)
- Stream Passage Pot, Gaping Gill
- Stump Cross Caverns
- Swinsto Cave
- Three Counties System
- Wades Entrance, Gaping Gill (See Flood Entrance Pot)
- Weathercote Cave
- White Scar Caves
- Yordas Cave
- Yordas Pot (See Yordas Cave)

=== Other areas ===
- Alloa Lea Quarry Cave, Northumberland
- Creswell Crags
- Excalibur Pot, North York Moors
- Kirkdale Cave, North York Moors
- Miss Grace's Lane, Forest of Dean, Gloucestershire
- Mother Ludlam's Cave, Moor Park, Farnham, Surrey
- Dog Hole Cave, Cumbria
- Pate Hole, Cumbria
- Slaughter Stream Cave, Forest of Dean, Gloucestershire
- Heathery Burn Cave, Stanhope, County Durham
- Pen Park Hole, Bristol
- Clearwell Caves, Forest of Dean, Gloucestershire

== Northern Ireland ==
The following are all within County Fermanagh unless otherwise stated. See also Caves of the Tullybrack and Belmore hills.

- Badger Pot
- Boho Caves
- Marble Arch Caves
- Noon's Hole
- Portbraddon Cave, County Antrim
- Shannon Cave, County Fermanagh and County Cavan, Republic of Ireland

== Scotland ==
- Calder's Geo, Shetland
- Cleeves Cove Cave, North Ayrshire
- Fingal's Cave, Inner Hebrides
- Smoo Cave, Sutherland
- Uamh An Claonaite, Sutherland

== Wales ==
All in Brecon Beacons unless stated.

- Cathole Cave, Gower
- Dan yr Ogof
- Ogof Agen Allwedd
- Ogof Craig a Ffynnon
- Ogof Daren Cilau
- Ogof Draenen
- Ogof Ffynnon Ddu
- Ogof Hen Ffynhonnau, Flintshire
- Ogof Hesp Alyn, Flintshire
- Ogof Llyn Parc, Wrexham
- Ogof Nadolig, Flintshire
- Ogof y Daren Cilau
- Otter Hole, Gwent
- Porth yr Ogof
- Pwll Dwfn

== Bibliography ==
- Allshorn, Sam; Swire, Paul (2017). Northern Caves: The Three Counties System and the North-West. High Mead. ISBN 9781527210950.
- Brook, G.; Davies, G.M.; Long, M.H.; Ryder, P.F. (1988). Northern Caves: Wharfedale & The North-East. Vol. 1. Dalesman Books. ISBN 0852069278.
- Brook, G.; Davies, G.M.; Long, M.H.; Ryder, P.F. (1991). Northern Caves: The Three Peaks. Vol. 2. Dalesman Books. ISBN 0852069278.
- Irwin, Dave (2013). Mendip Underground: A Caver's Guide (4th ed.). Mendip Cave Registry and Archive. ISBN 9780953131051.
- Oldham, Tony; Oldham, T.E.A; Smart, T. (1986). The Concise Caves Of Devon.

== See also ==
- Caving in the United Kingdom
- Geography of the United Kingdom
- List of caves
- List of UK caving fatalities
- Speleology
