= List of caves in the Peak District =

List of caves in the English Peak District

This is a partial list of caves in the Peak District of England, arranged alphabetically. Most lie within the Peak District National Park.

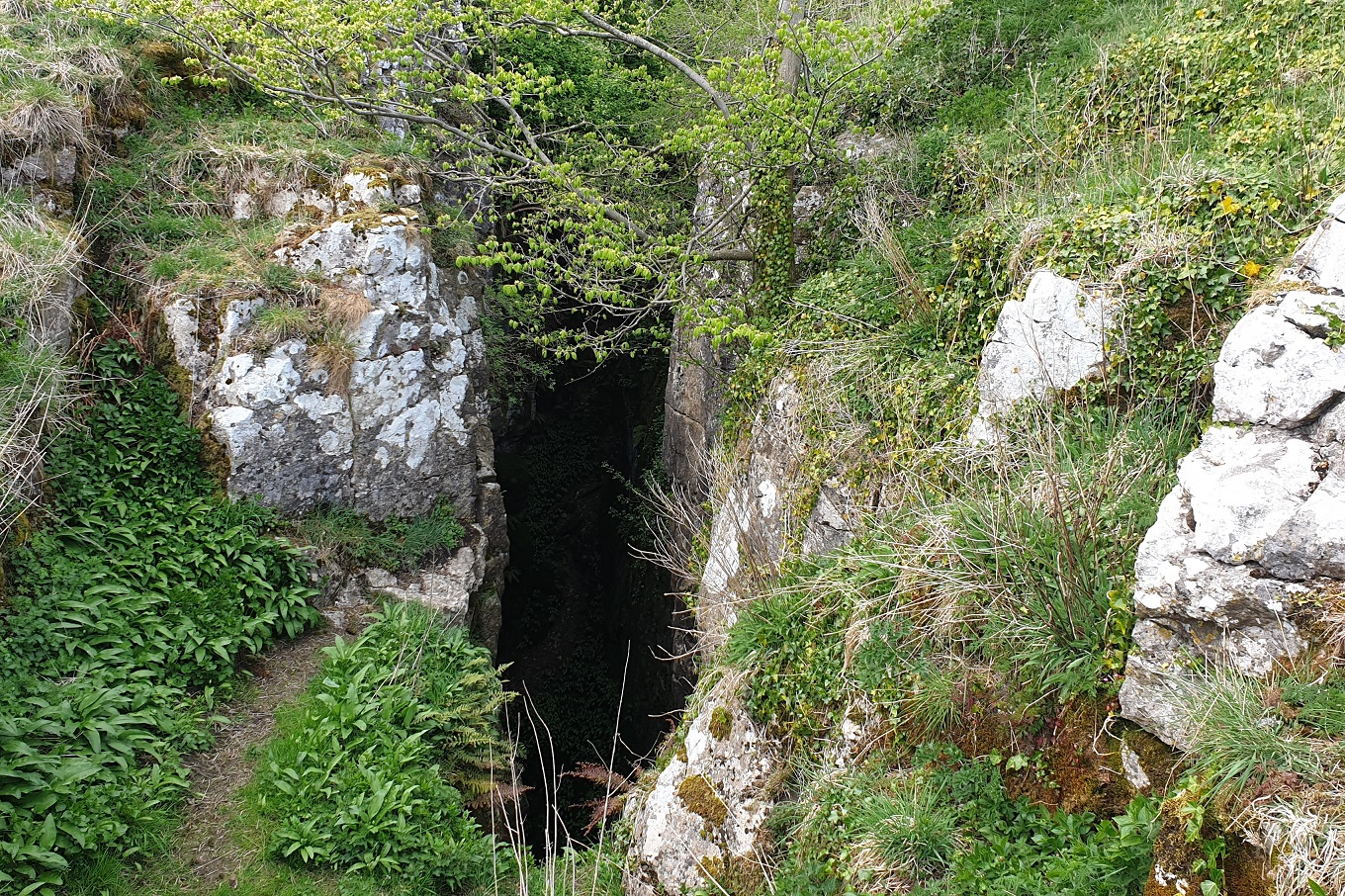
Eldon Hole

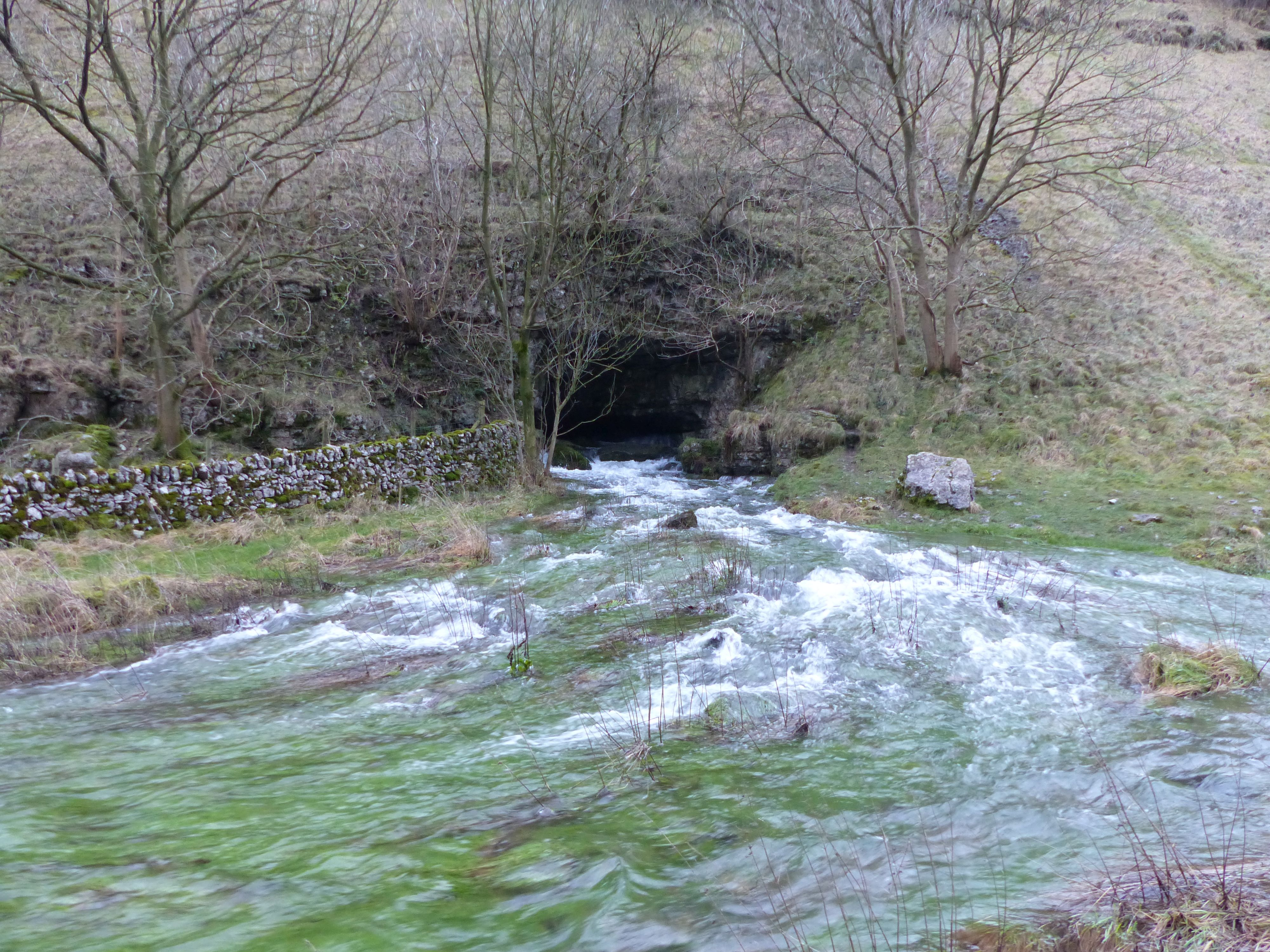
Lathkill Head Cave

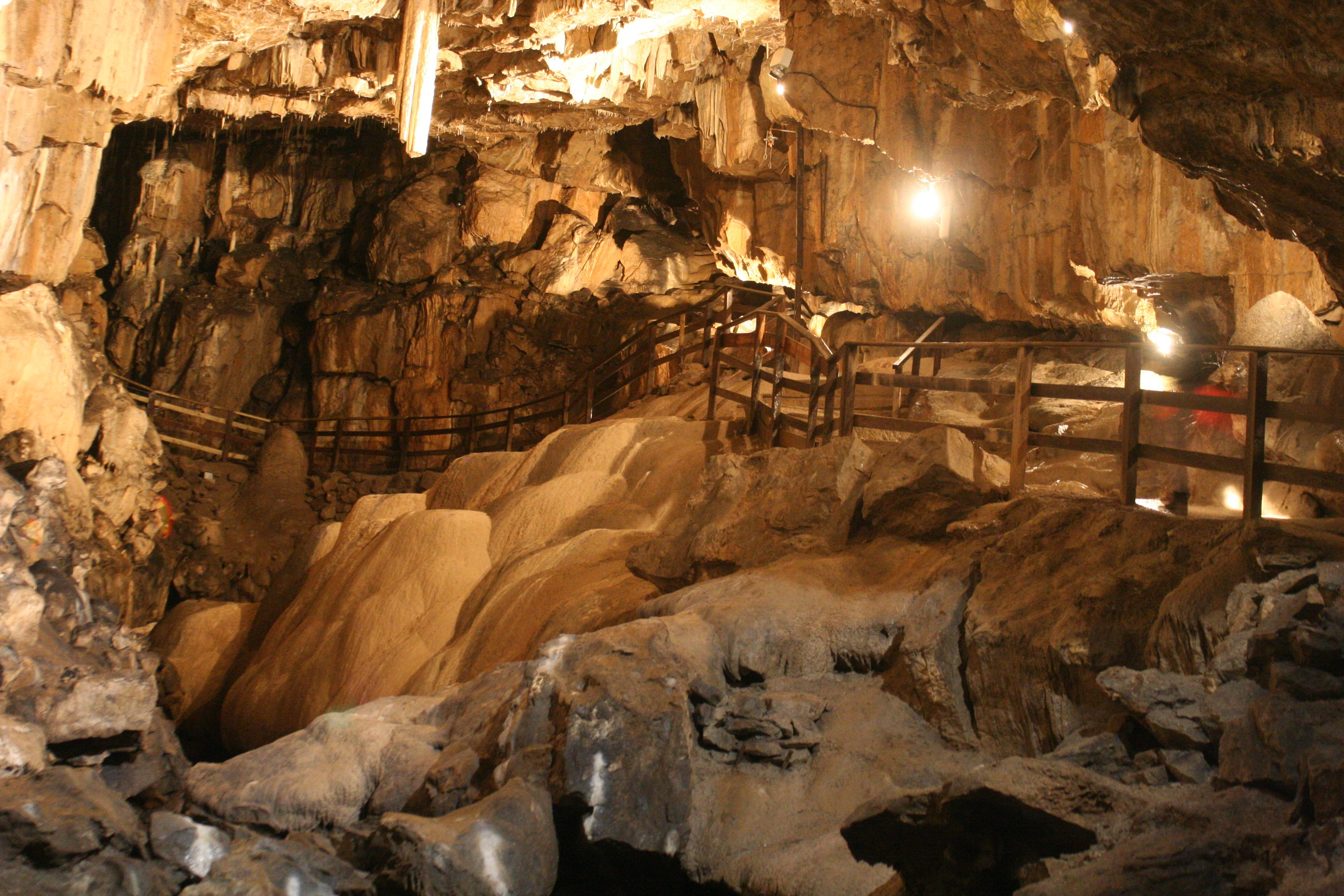
Poole's Cavern

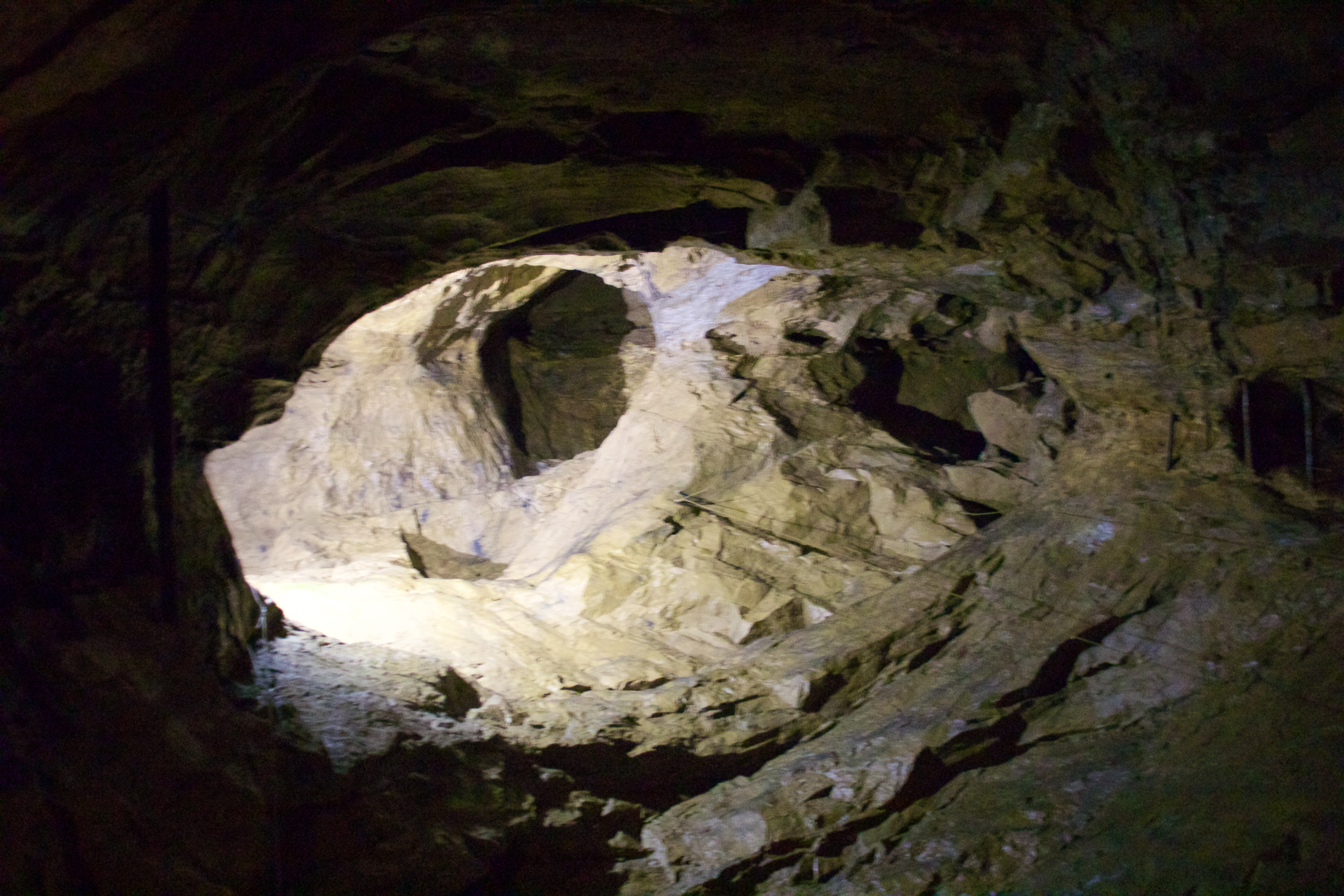
Speedwell Cavern

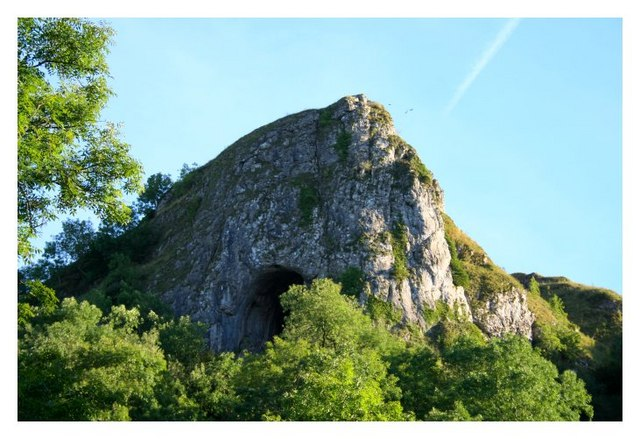
Thor's Cave

Some of the caves are protected Scheduled Monuments and are marked with * in the table below.

Cave	Near	County	Length (m)	Depth (m)	Grid reference
Bagshawe Cavern	Castleton	Derbyshire	5000	75	SK 1716 8089
Blue John Cavern	Castleton	Derbyshire	1274	90	SK 1318 8320
Carlswark Cavern	Stoney Middleton	Derbyshire	3200	60	SK 2207 7581
Cratcliff Rocks hermitage*	Bakewell	Derbyshire			SK 2275 6234
Cumberland Cavern	Matlock	Derbyshire	400	0	SK 2923 5773
Devonshire Cavern	Matlock	Derbyshire	305	80	SK 290 584
Dowel Cave*	Buxton	Derbyshire	15	0	SK 0756 6760
Dream Cave	Matlock	Derbyshire		15	SK 275 530
Elderbush Cave*	Wetton	Staffordshire	46		SK 0978 5488
Eldon Hole	Castleton	Derbyshire	200	85	SK 1161 8090
Fox Hole Cave*	Buxton	Derbyshire	56	0	SK 0997 6618
Gautries Cave	Castleton	Derbyshire	659	26	SK 1013 8145
Giant's Hole	Castleton	Derbyshire	2298	140	SK 1194 8268
Great Masson Cavern	Matlock	Derbyshire	5000	0	SK 292 586
Great Rutland Cavern	Matlock	Derbyshire	171	0	SK 2925 5858
Harboro' Cave*	Matlock	Derbyshire	15	0	SK 2422 5523
Jug Holes	Matlock	Derbyshire	800	0	SK 2797 5959
Lathkill Head Cave	Bakewell	Derbyshire	1525	55	SK 1707 6589
Merlin's Mine	Stoney Middleton	Derbyshire	1000	30	SK 2177 7591
Nettle Pot	Castleton	Derbyshire	798	174	SK 1253 8200
Odin Cave	Castleton	Derbyshire	42	0	SK 1342 8346
Ossom's Cave*	Wetton	Staffordshire	18		SK 0958 5576
Oxlow Cavern	Castleton	Derbyshire	2134	145	SK 1241 8219
P8	Castleton	Derbyshire	1800	0	SK 1078 8179
Peak Cavern	Castleton	Derbyshire	6026	130	SK 1486 8257
Plunge Hole	Buxton	Derbyshire	9	15	SK 0438 7133
Poole's Cavern	Buxton	Derbyshire	244	0	SK 050 725
Reynard's Cave	Ashbourne	Derbyshire	12	0	SK 1451 5252
Rowter Hole	Castleton	Derbyshire	1044	182	SK 1343 8233
Speedwell Cavern	Castleton	Derbyshire	6929	235	SK 1393 8275
Suicide Cave	Castleton	Derbyshire	137	27	SK 1375 8271
Thirst House Cave	Buxton	Derbyshire	58	0	SK 0969 7133
Thor's Cave	Wetton	Staffordshire	46	0	SK 0986 5496
Titan	Castleton	Derbyshire	2086	196	SK 1387 8184
Treak Cliff Cavern	Castleton	Derbyshire	305	0	SK 1357 8310
Winnats Head Cave	Castleton	Derbyshire	610	148	SK 1314 8282

== See also ==
- List of caves in the United Kingdom
- Scheduled monuments in Derbyshire
- Scheduled monuments in Staffordshire
