= List of caves in Derbyshire =

This is a partial list of caves in Derbyshire, England, arranged alphabetically. Many lie within the Peak District National Park.

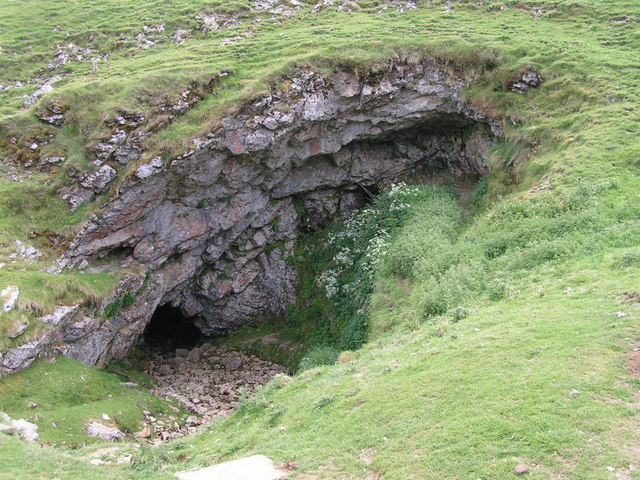
Giant's Hole

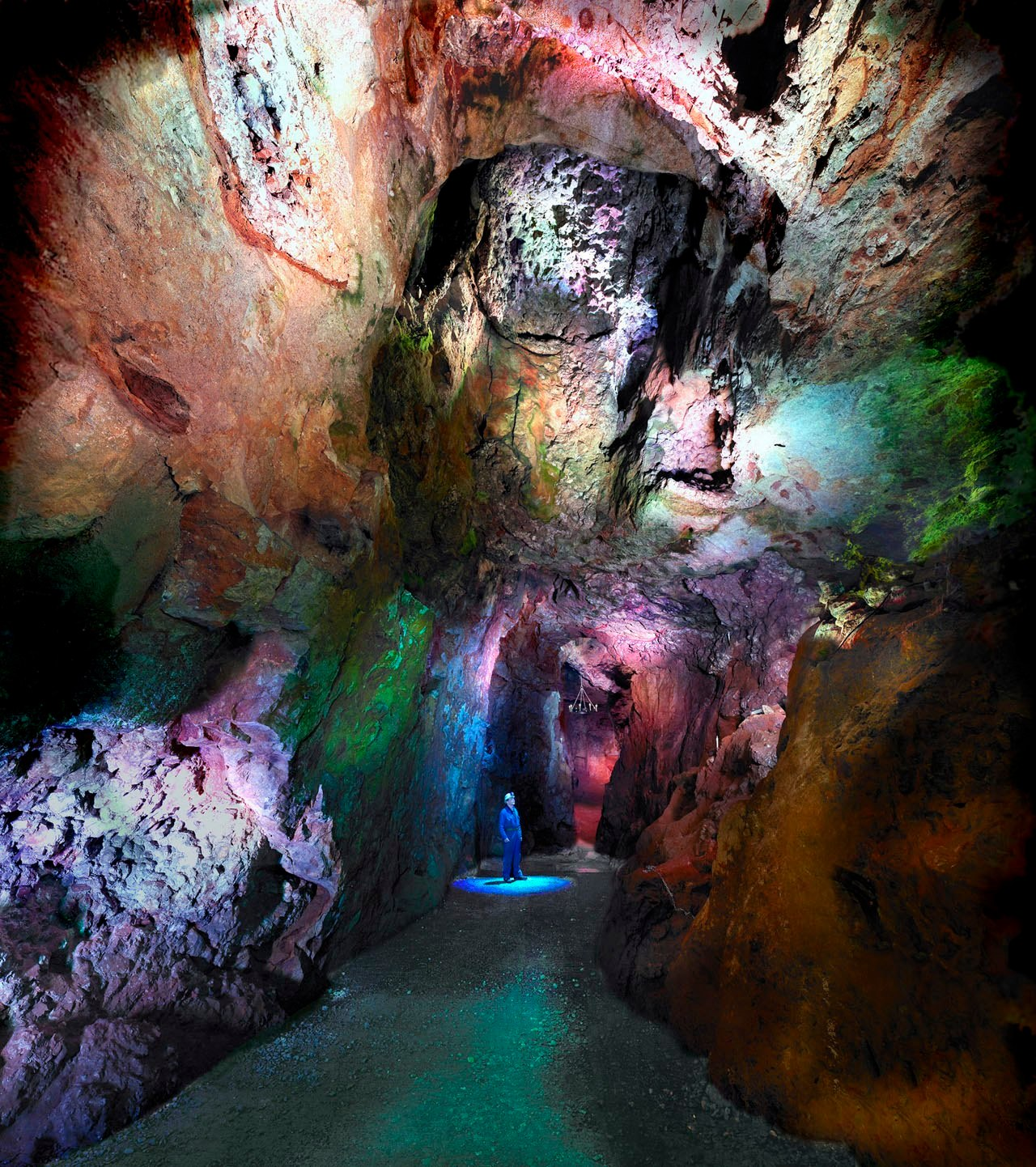
Great Masson Cavern

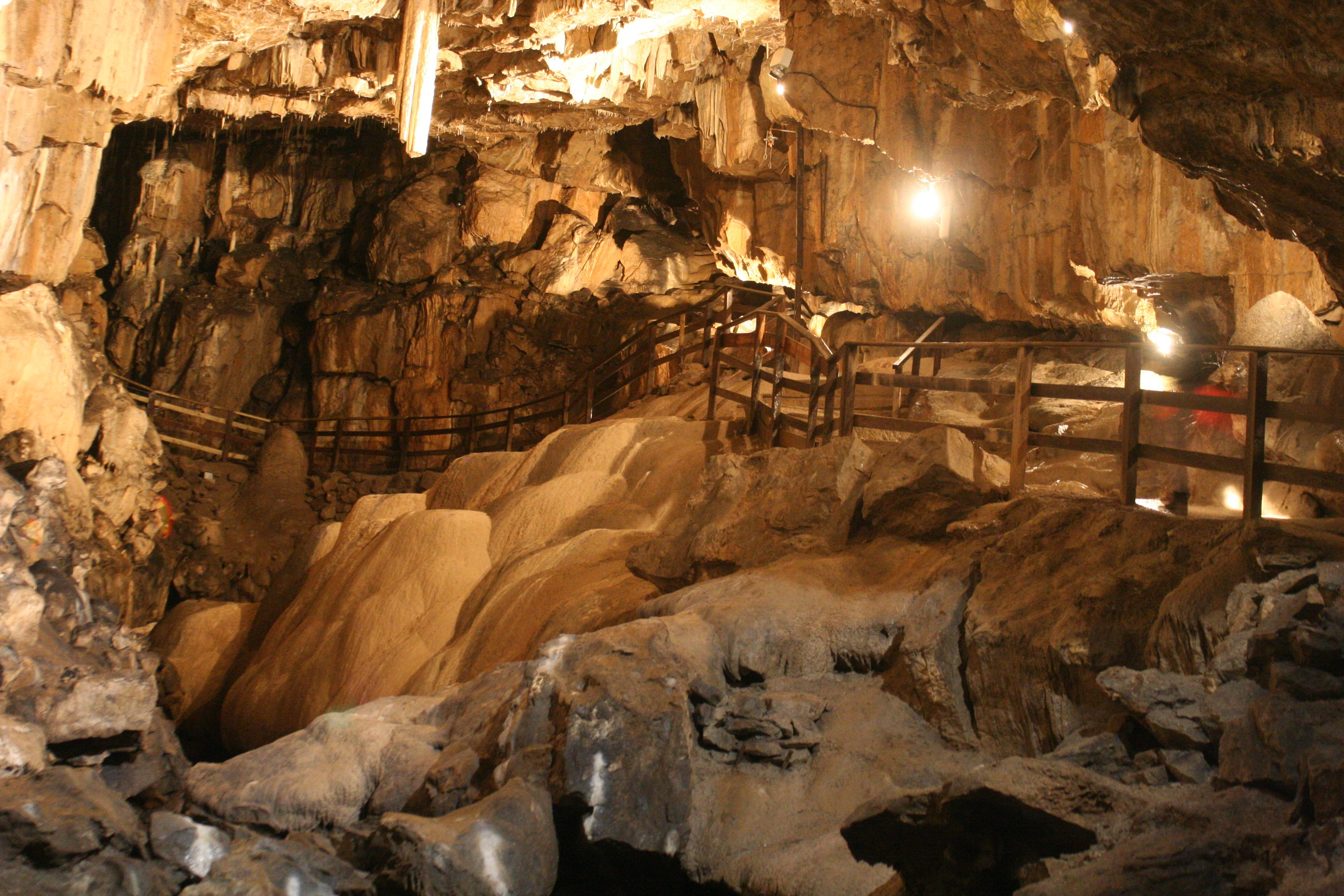
Poole's Cavern

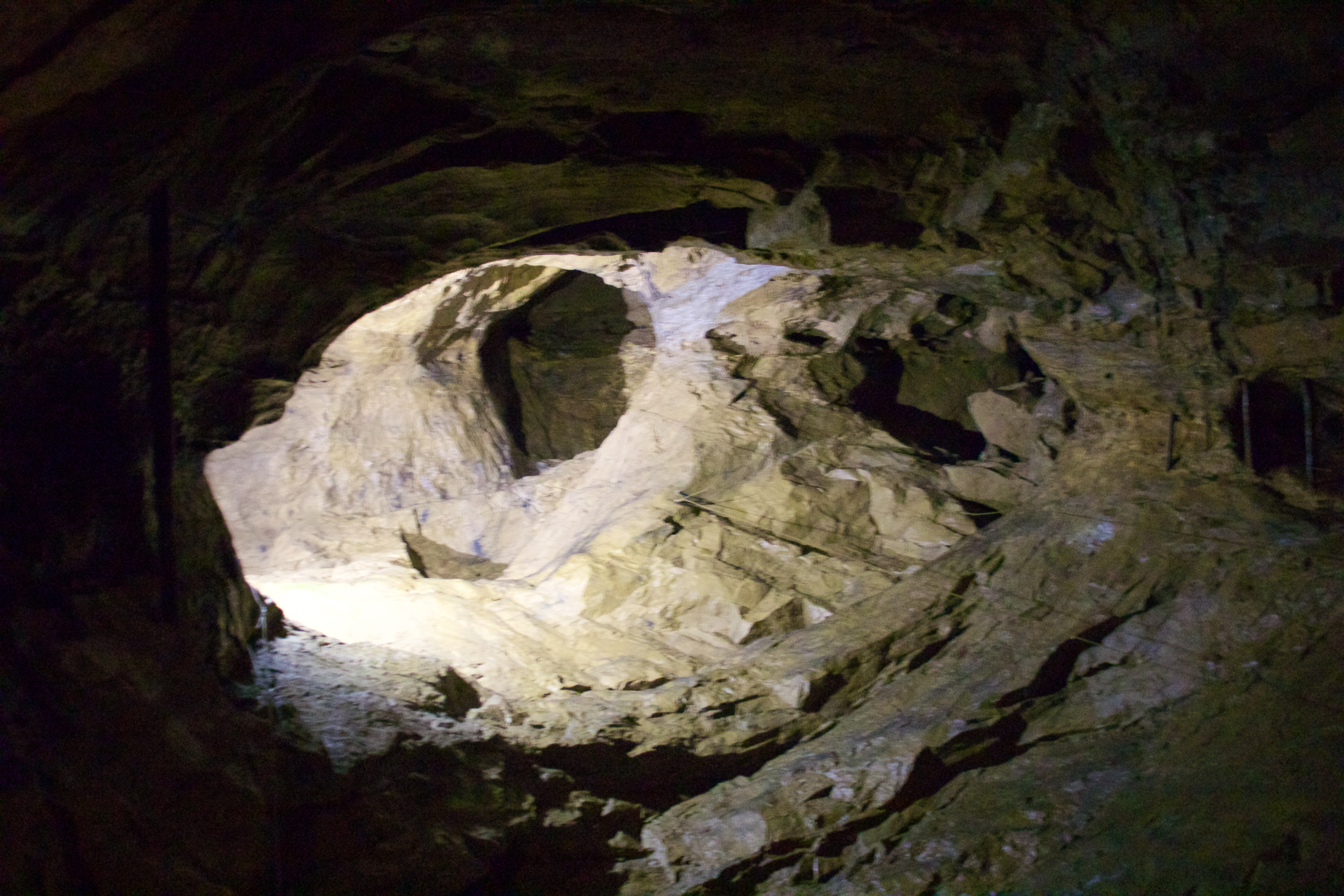
Speedwell Cavern

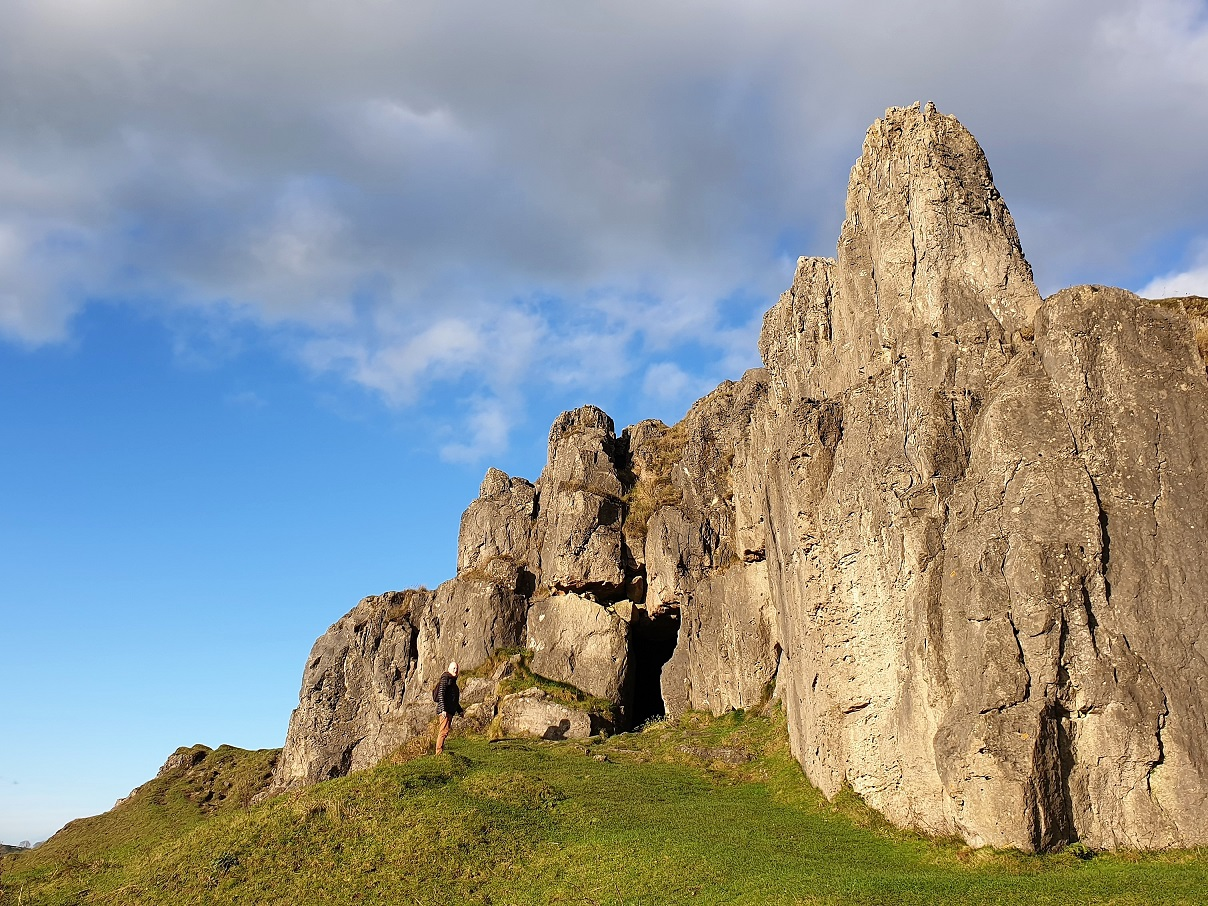
Cave entrance at Harboro' Rocks

Some of the caves are protected Scheduled Monuments and are marked with * in the table below.

Cave	Near	Length (m)	Depth (m)	Grid reference
Anchor Church	Derby			SK 3384 2728
Ash Tree Cave*	Chesterfield	7	3	SK 5148 7614
Bagshawe Cavern	Castleton	5000	75	SK 1716 8089
Blue John Cavern	Castleton	1274	90	SK 1318 8320
Carlswark Cavern	Stoney Middleton	3200	60	SK 2207 7581
Cratcliff Rocks hermitage*	Bakewell			SK 2275 6234
Cumberland Cavern	Matlock	400	0	SK 2923 5773
Devonshire Cavern	Matlock	305	80	SK 290 584
Dowel Cave*	Buxton	15	0	SK 0756 6760
Dream Cave	Matlock		15	SK 275 530
Eldon Hole	Castleton	200	85	SK 1161 8090
Fox Hole Cave*	Buxton	56	0	SK 0997 6618
Gautries Cave	Castleton	659	26	SK 1013 8145
Giant's Hole	Castleton	2298	140	SK 1194 8268
Great Masson Cavern	Matlock	5000	0	SK 292 586
Great Rutland Cavern	Matlock	171	0	SK 2925 5858
Harboro' Cave*	Matlock	15	0	SK 2422 5523
Hermitage at Dale Abbey*	Derby			SK 4388 3849
Jug Holes	Matlock	800	0	SK 2797 5959
Langwith Cave*	Chesterfield	30		SK 5180 6950
Lathkill Head Cave	Bakewell	1525	55	SK 1707 6589
Merlin's Mine	Stoney Middleton	1000	30	SK 2177 7591
Mother Grundy's Parlour*	Chesterfield	15		SK 5354 7422
Nettle Pot	Castleton	798	174	SK 1253 8200
Odin Cave	Castleton	42	0	SK 1342 8346
Oxlow Cavern	Castleton	2134	145	SK 1241 8219
P8	Castleton	1800	0	SK 1078 8179
Peak Cavern	Castleton	6026	130	SK 1486 8257
Pinhole Cave*	Chesterfield	52		SK 5354 7422
Plunge Hole	Buxton	9	15	SK 0438 7133
Poole's Cavern	Buxton	244	0	SK 050 725
Reynard's Cave	Ashbourne	12	0	SK 1451 5252
Robin Hood's Cave*	Chesterfield	290		SK 5354 7422
Rowter Hole	Castleton	1044	182	SK 1343 8233
Speedwell Cavern	Castleton	6929	235	SK 1393 8275
Suicide Cave	Castleton	137	27	SK 1375 8271
Thirst House Cave	Buxton	58	0	SK 0969 7133
Titan	Castleton	2086	196	SK 1387 8184
Treak Cliff Cavern	Castleton	305	0	SK 1357 8310
Winnats Head Cave	Castleton	610	148	SK 1314 8282

== See also ==
- List of caves in the United Kingdom
- Scheduled monuments in Derbyshire
