= Disappointment Pot =

Cave entrance in North Yorkshire, England

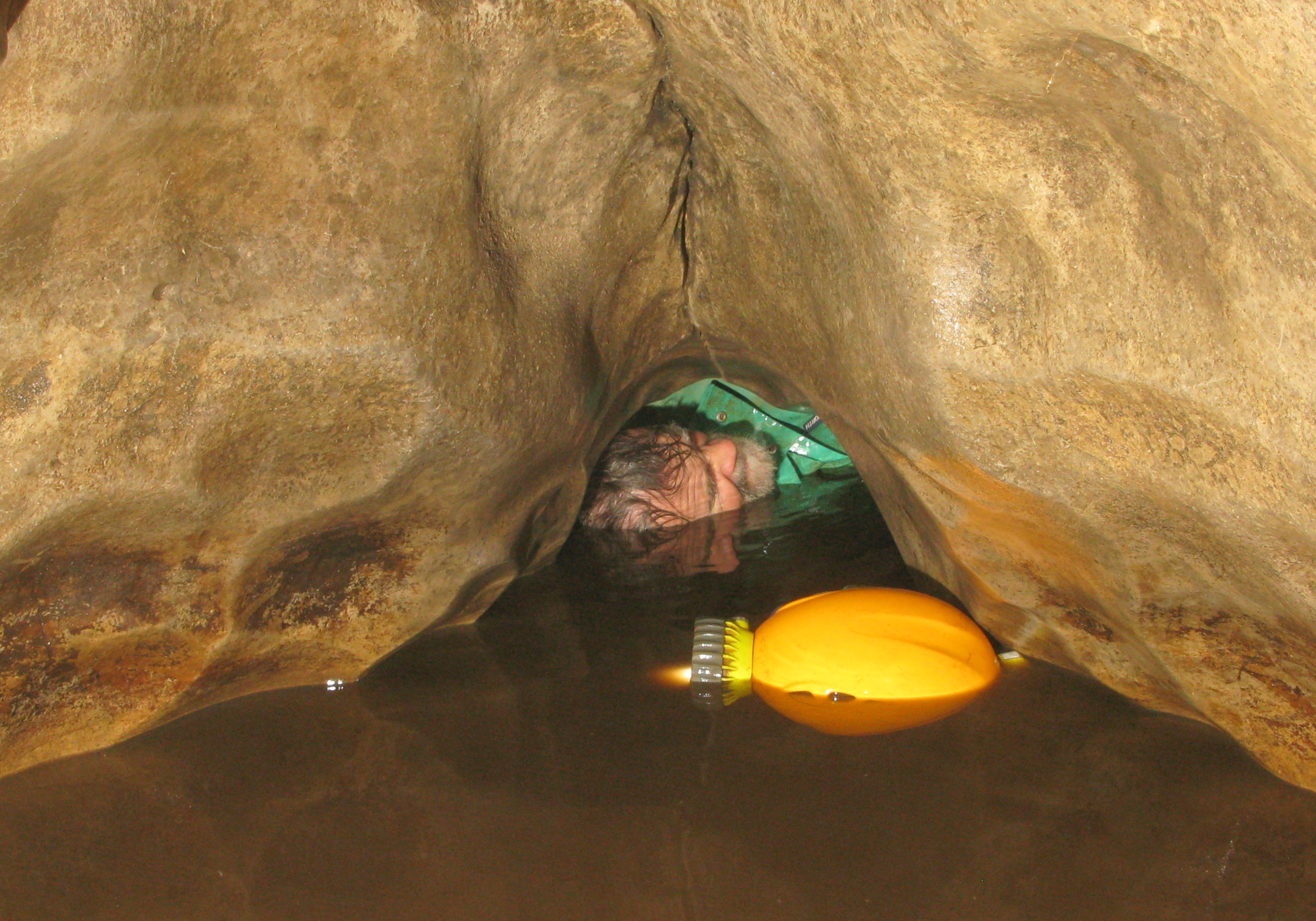
- Negotiating the duck in Disappointment Pot

- Location within Yorkshire Dales
- Location: Ingleborough, North Yorkshire
- OS grid: SD 7505 7260
- Coordinates: 54°08′55″N 2°23′01″W
- Depth: 110 metres (360 ft) (To Hensler's Master Cave)
- Length: 500 metres (1,600 ft)
- Elevation: 395 metres (1,296 ft)
- Discovery: 1912
- Geology: Carboniferous limestone
- Entrances: 3
- Difficulty: IV
- Hazards: water, verticality
- Access: Permit
- Cave survey: On Cavemaps

Disappointment Pot is one of the entrances to the Gaping Gill cave system, located in a steep grassy shakehole some 120 metres (130 yd) south-east of Gaping Gill Main Shaft. Its mainly narrow stream passage descends a number of small shafts to enter the main system as a major inlet of Hensler's Master Cave. It lies within the designated Ingleborough Site of Special Scientific Interest.

== Description ==
A 10-metre (33 ft) climb at the base of the grassy shakehole drops into a stream passage. Upstream, a climb enters a passage which after 100 metres (330 ft) leads to the stream sink and the Motley Pot exit. Downstream, a narrow meandering streamway leads to a short flat-out section, followed by a duck, a short section with minimal airspace. The passage becomes larger as it approaches the first of its five short pitches. Shortly before the third pitch, a high aven is where Marilyn, the third entrance, enters the system. The fifth pitch is the largest at 14 metres (46 ft), and this enters a large chamber. The way on is down a boulder ruckle and along a spacious passage for some 80 metres (260 ft) to the connection with Hensler's Master Cave in the main Gaping Gill System.

Motley Pot, (54.149047°N 2.384708°W), currently blocked, enters some small passages carrying the main stream from the adjacent sink to a 4 metres (13 ft) climb down just upstream of the main entrance.

Marilyn, (54.147000°N 2.380520°W), drops directly down a couple of pitches, 25 metres (82 ft) and 23 metres (75 ft), to enter Disappointment Pot just before the third pitch, hence bypassing the tight meanders and the wet crawls.

A number of fossil and active inlet passages have been explored in the roof of the main streamway.

== History ==
The cave was first entered by J. Blackburn-Holden and Eli Simpson in 1912, in the hope that it would prove to be another entrance into Gaping Gill, as had Flood Entrance Pot discovered not long before. They were disappointed to find that after 100 metres (330 ft) the cave terminated in a low water-filled crawl, hence its name. The passages at the bottom, leading from Hensler's Master Cave to the chamber where the last pitch of Disappointment Pot enters the system were found by Eric Hensler in 1937 when he discovered over 1.5 kilometres (1 mi) of passage in Gaping Gill on a solo trip. In 1944 Bob Leakey stripped naked and dived through the flooded passage at the end of Disappointment Pot which had previously stopped Simpson to find airspace where he could stand. He was then able to demolish a small dam of consolidated stones to lower the water level. This enabled the cave to be explored to the bottom.

Motley Pot was dug through by members of Bradford Pothole Club in 1984 to establish an entrance close to the stream sink. The third entrance, Marilyn was opened up members of Craven Pothole Club in 2005. A couple of pitches drop almost directly into Disappointment Pot (although the second pitch had been previously climbed from below in 1995 by members of Bradford Pothole Club).
