= Bar Pot =

Cave entrance in North Yorkshire, England

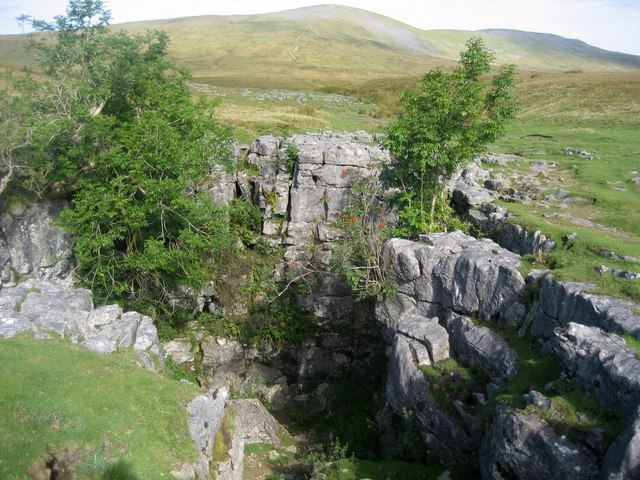
- Entrance shakehole of Bar Pot

- Location within Yorkshire Dales
- Location: Ingleborough, North Yorkshire, [UK]
- OS grid: SD 7517 7234
- Coordinates: 54°08′47″N 2°22′54″W
- Depth: 104 metres (341 ft) (To South East Passage)
- Length: 274 metres (899 ft)
- Elevation: 395 metres (1,296 ft)
- Discovery: 1949
- Geology: Carboniferous limestone
- Entrances: 3
- Difficulty: III
- Hazards: verticality
- Access: Permit
- Cave survey: 1980 LUSS survey on Cavemaps

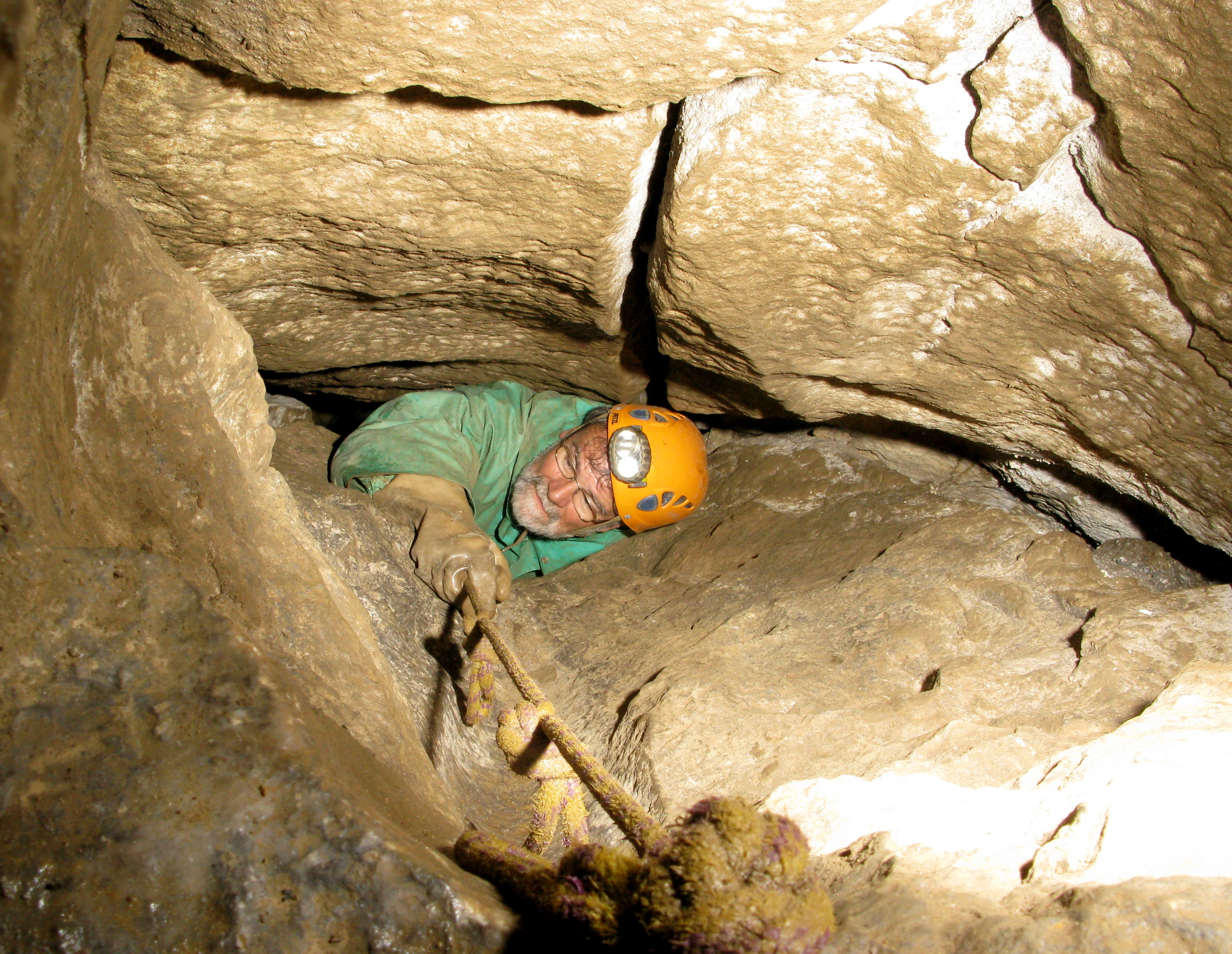
Negotiating the Molestrangler in Stile Pot

Bar Pot is one of the entrances to the Gaping Gill cave system being located about 340 metres (370 yd) south of Gaping Gill Main Shaft, on Ingleborough in the Yorkshire Dales. It is a popular entrance into the system, being one of the easiest, driest, and having just two vertical pitches to contend with. It lies within the designated Ingleborough Site of Special Scientific Interest.

== Description ==
A descending passage at the base of the large rocky shakehole leads to a 13-metre (43 ft) pitch, which is restricted at the top. Below the pitch a step down leads to the top of the Greasy Slab, a 4-metre (13 ft) slab normally negotiated with a handline. This drops into Bridge Hall. At the bottom of the boulder slope Horrocks' Way on the left leads into a further set of descending chambers. At the bottom of these are the two pitches into South-East Passage of Gaping Gill. The main pitch (30 metres (98 ft)) is straight ahead and can be reached by traversing round the ledge on the left, or by crawling forward from the bottom of the slope.

An alternative (and the original) route to the Big Pitch is also accessed from the bottom of the entrance pitch. A wide bedding passage leads to the right. Across the other side a 3-metre (10 ft) climb leads to a 10-metre (33 ft) pitch. At the bottom of this a thin rift drops into a low bedding which soon enlarges and morphs into Whitehall, a high rift passage. At the bottom turn left to arrive at the back of the platform overlooking the Big Pitch.

Other passages of note:

- A small passage to the left at the base of the entrance pitch drops into the top of Bridge Hall.
- Veering right after the pit in the wide bedding leading off from the base of the entrance pitch leads to Small Mammal House and the alternative entrances of Small Mammal Pot and Stile Pot.
- A passage to the right at the bottom of Bridge Hall (Leakey's Way) leads into Whitehall.
- A traverse round to the right of Bridge Hall leads into the Graveyard Inlet which almost reaches the surface.
- A climb in the Bridge Hall Aven leads into Violet Ground Beetle Passage, another inlet series.
- A passage across from the Big Pitch on the left leads to an alternative descent down South-East Aven, and also to Wild Cat Rift, a passage which descends to the hole in the wall opposite the bottom of the Big Pitch.
- A rope climb above the start of the traverse to the normal descent of the Big Pitch enters Horrocks-Stearn Crawl which leads into Flood Entrance Pot near the top of the main pitch.

Small Mammal Pot (54.146176°N 2.381230°W) may be found in a patch of clints 5 metres (5 yd) from the top of the path down into the Bar Pot shakehole. A 3-metre (10 ft) climb down enters a passage which almost immediately drops down a 19-metre (62 ft) pitch into Bar Pot's Small Mammal House. Small Mammal House was named after the piles of small mammal bones found on the floor when it was first explored, so it was evident that a connection to the surface was close by.

Stile Pot (54.146155°N 2.381075°W) is in the shakehole below Small Mammal Pot near the wall-stile. A steeply descending passage, loose and tight in places, emerges through the floor of Small Mammal House.

== History ==
The cave was first entered in 1949 by members of the British Speleological Association, who moved a few boulders at the bottom of the shakehole. The original route to the Big Pitch was through the bedding below the entrance pitch, down the 10-metre (33 ft) pitch, and through Whitehall. Bob Leakey then discovered the route from Bridge Hall to Whitehall, and Ken Horrocks discovered the passage named after him which is now the voie normale.

Wild Cat Rift was explored by members of the Northern Cave Club from below in 1969. Small Mammal House and the Graveyard Inlet was discovered by members of Lancaster University Speleological Society in the late 1970s, and Violet Ground Beetle Passage was first entered by John Cordingley in 1993.

The alternative entrance of Small Mammal Pot was opened up from below by Mike Wooding and John Gardner in 2005. The alternative entrance of Stile Pot was opened up by John Gardner, John Sellers, Dave Checkley and Phil Johnstone in 2008.

In 1959, Eric Sugden died when he fell down the entrance pitch whilst rigging it. In 1980 Lancaster University Speleological Society published a comprehensive survey of the cave. In 1987 the management of Ingleborough Show Cave submitted a planning application to develop Bar Pot for adventure caving tourist trips. The plans included setting up scaffolding structures supporting ladders for the two pitches, but the application was withdrawn after objections were voiced by a number of interested parties including the British Cave Research Association, the Nature Conservancy Council, and the Yorkshire Dales National Park.
