= Skirwith Cave =

Cave in North Yorkshire, England

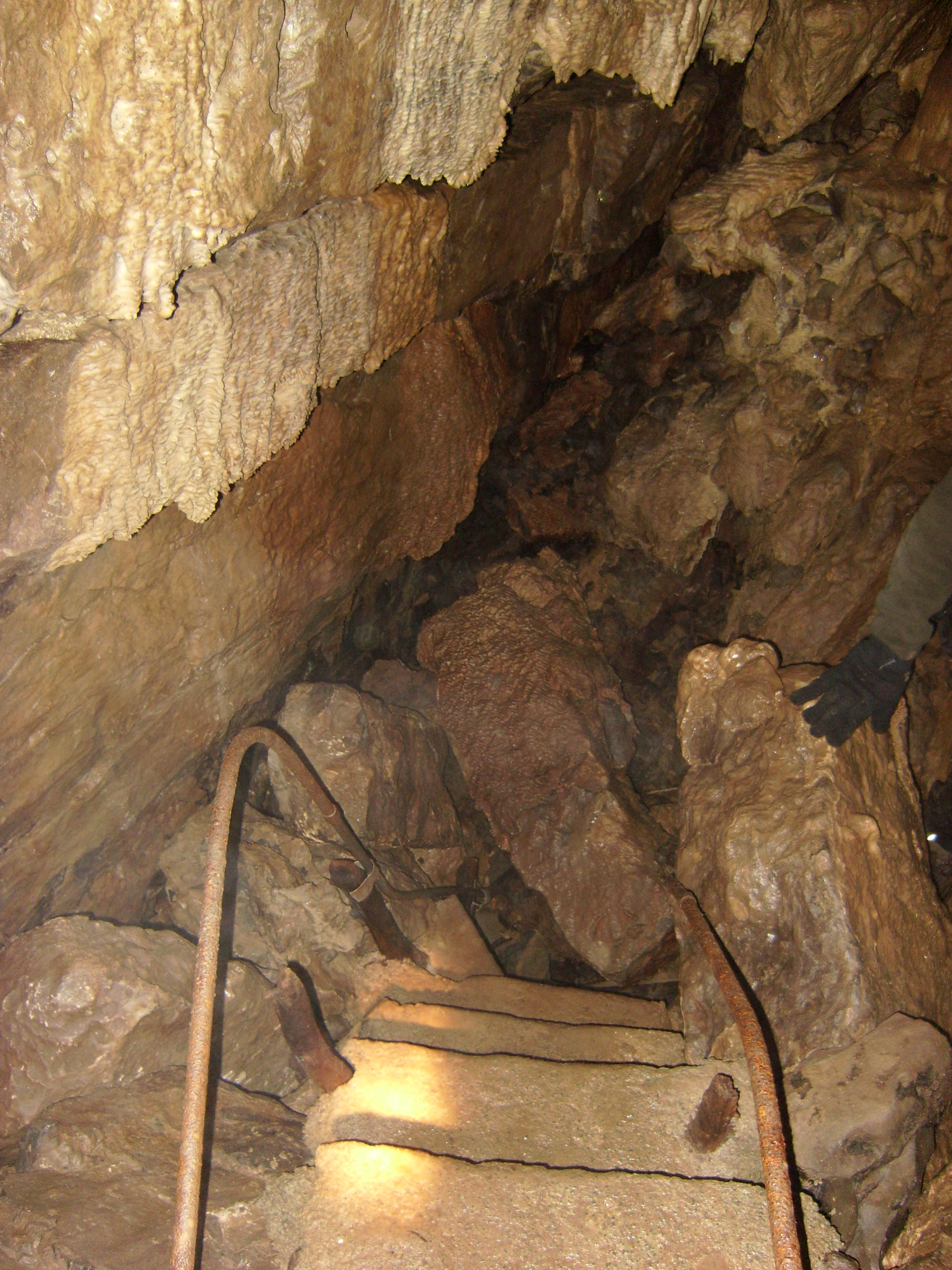
- Remnants of a stairway in Skirwith Cave

- Location within Yorkshire Dales
- Location: Ingleborough, North Yorkshire, [UK]
- OS grid: SD 7095 7378
- Coordinates: 54°09′32″N 2°26′47″W
- Length: 1,000 metres (3,300 ft)
- Elevation: 275 metres (902 ft)
- Discovery: 1934
- Geology: Carboniferous limestone
- Entrances: 1
- Difficulty: III
- Hazards: water, loose boulders
- Access: Permit
- Cave survey: 1980 NCC line survey on Cavemaps

Skirwith Cave is a major resurgence solutional cave on Ingleborough in Chapel-le-Dale, North Yorkshire, England; it was a show cave between 1964 and 1974. It is no longer open to the public but is still visited by cavers. It lies within the designated Ingleborough Site of Special Scientific Interest.

== Description ==
The current entrance is through an opening in a small shakehole. This drops into a well-decorated rift passage, which was part of the former show cave. A levelled floor reaches a boulder choke which once had a flight of steps leading over it; this is now covered by a boulder collapse. The show cave terminated at a five-metre (16 ft) waterfall. Above this, a long, mainly low, wet passage reaches a sump after several hundred metres. This is the first of three short sumps separated by short sections of passage. The fourth sump has been dived for 24 metres (79 ft) to an underwater boulder choke. The cave has no inlet passages in its 1,000-metre (3,300 ft) length.

== Geology and hydrology ==
Skirwith Cave is a solutional cave formed in the lowest beds of the Visean Great Scar limestone from the Mississippian Series of the Carboniferous period, which here lies unconformably on impervious Ordovician rocks. The cave runs up dip NNE towards the valley of Crina Bottom, and drains the area around Boggarts Roaring Holes on the other side of the valley, although in times of flood it also takes water from overflow sinks in Crina Bottom itself. A fragment of the continuing passage has been entered from Lower Hardgill Pot, some 400 metres (1,300 ft) away in Crina Bottom. The water resurges on the basal unconformity.

== History ==
It is thought that the cave was first entered by locals in 1934, and at least some of the upstream passages were further explored by members of the Yorkshire Ramblers' Club in 1935. By 1947, the cave had been fully explored to the first sump. The sumps were explored in 1965 and 1966 by members of the Happy Wanderers Cave and Pothole Club.

The cave was opened as a show cave in 1964; it was always a smaller commercial operation than the nearby showcaves Ingleborough and White Scar, and more difficult of access for visitors. Blasting from the local quarry destabilized the roof and boulder piles, and the cave was closed in 1974. Little evidence remains above ground of its use as a show cave.
