= Jib Tunnel =

Cave entrance in North Yorkshire, England

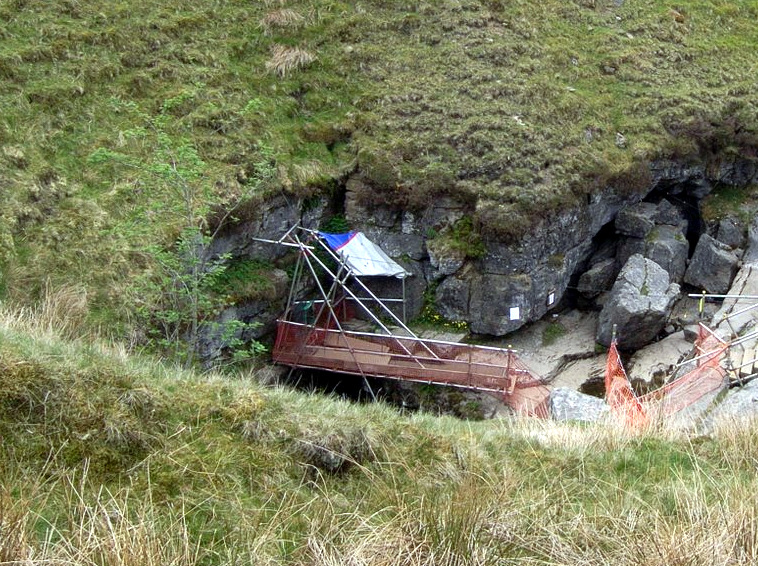
- The entrance is between the rock wall and the large boulder

- Location within Yorkshire Dales
- Location: Ingleborough, North Yorkshire, UK
- OS grid: SD 7510 7270
- Coordinates: 54°08′58″N 2°22′57″W
- Depth: 98 metres (322 ft) (To floor of Gaping Gill Main Chamber)
- Length: 100 metres (330 ft) (including Spout Tunnel)
- Elevation: 396 metres (1,299 ft)
- Discovery: 1872
- Geology: Carboniferous limestone
- Entrances: 1
- Difficulty: IV-V
- Hazards: water, verticality
- Access: Permit
- Cave survey: 1976 CPC Survey on Cave Maps

Jib Tunnel, also known as Lateral Passage, is one of the entrances into the Gaping Gill cave system in North Yorkshire, located behind a large boulder in the north bank of Fell Beck adjacent to Gaping Gill Main Shaft. Although short, it leads to Lateral Shaft, a direct descent into Gaping Gill Main Chamber which is a popular caving route, and has had considerable significance in the history of the exploration of Gaping Gill. It lies within the designated Ingleborough Site of Special Scientific Interest.

== Description ==
A short wriggle between the shakehole wall and a large boulder leads into the roomy passage. After 5 metres (16 ft) this abruptly drops 98 metres (322 ft) to the floor of the Main Chamber. Although a direct descent is possible, a considerable waterfall enters from Spout Tunnel 12 metres (39 ft) below the lip, so the modern route, known as Dihedral, deviates away from this to land on a ledge some 50 metres (160 ft) down. The route then leaves the shaft to drop down the rift above the Main Chamber, before emerging through the roof and dropping the final 30 metres (98 ft) to the floor.

Spout Tunnel can be entered by swinging in from a rope or ladder. The passage becomes narrow, and after 37 metres (121 ft) the main water enters down a 9 metres (30 ft) pitch. Above this a further 3 metres (9.8 ft) climb enters 49 metres (161 ft) of passage which gets too small close to a sink in Fell Beck opposite Rat Hole Sink. Below the pitch a small passage continues for another 25 metres (82 ft), and is thought to drain the area just to the east of the blind valley.

== History ==
Professor McKenny Hughes reported that the entrance was blocked with glacial fill until a flood in 1872, when it got washed out. He wriggled round the large boulder and reached the shaft which he estimated as being in excess of 90 metres (300 ft) deep. In 1895 Edward Calvert, of the Yorkshire Ramblers' Club, attempted to replicate Edouard Martel's descent of the Main Shaft of a few weeks earlier, but failed to get beyond Birkbeck's Ledge at −60 metres (−200 ft) because of the quantity of water. Looking up, he could see that the shaft divided behind a curtain. Later in the year he entered Jib Tunnel, and realised that this was the parallel shaft that he had seen, and that a man could be lowered directly to the floor of the Main Chamber from its lip. The following year, he set up a series of jibs and pulleys, and was lowered in a boatswain's chair, becoming the second person to reach the Main Chamber. Jib Tunnel was used for explorations of the system until 1921, when the current system of lowering the winch from a gantry positioned across the corner of the Main Shaft was developed.

There have been three deaths in the cave. In 1982 Ted Holstead died after losing control when abseiling down the shaft. In 1989 Keith Mann died of exposure whilst prusiking up the shaft on rope. In 1995 eleven-year-old Lee Craddock wandered into Jib Tunnel and fell down the shaft to his death whilst on an outing organised by the Scouting Association.
