= Long Kin East Cave – Rift Pot System =

Cave system in North Yorkshire, England

Long Kin East – Rift Pot System
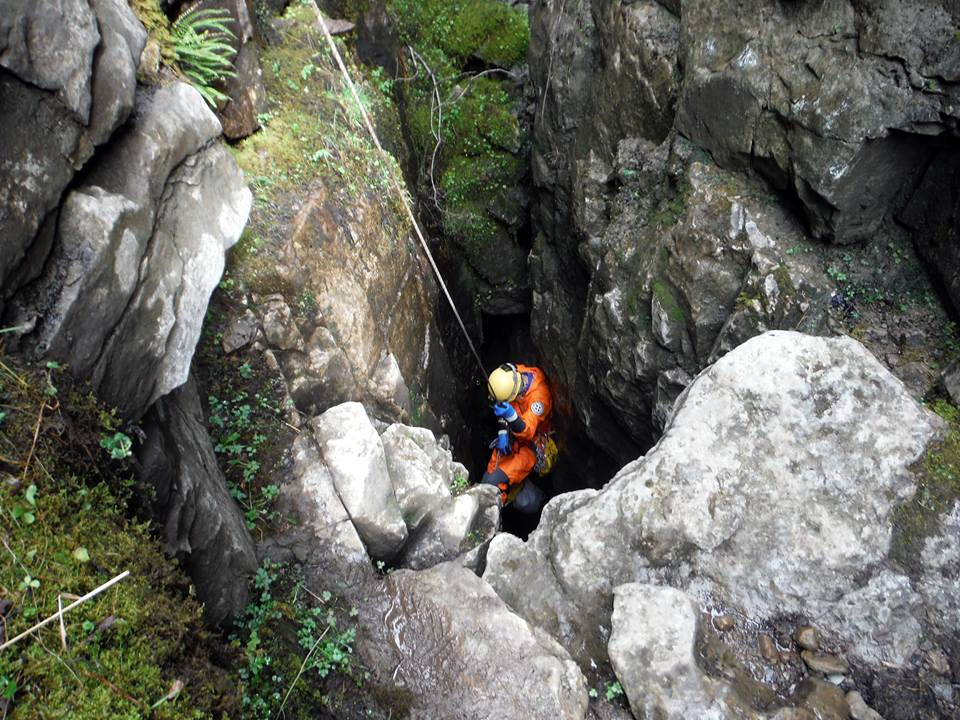
- A caver descending the entrance pitch of Rift Pot

- Location within Yorkshire Dales
- Location: Ingleborough, North Yorkshire, England
- OS grid: SD 7624 7307
- Coordinates: 54°09′11″N 2°21′55″W
- Depth: 116 metres (381 ft)
- Length: 1.5 kilometres (0.93 mi)
- Elevation: 411 metres (1,348 ft)
- Discovery: 1904
- Geology: Carboniferous limestone
- Entrances: 5
- Hazards: verticality, water, boulders
- Access: Booking required
- Cave survey: On Cave Mapper

The Long Kin East Cave – Rift Pot system is a limestone cave system on the southern flanks of Ingleborough, North Yorkshire in England lying within the designated Ingleborough Site of Special Scientific Interest. Long Kin East Cave starts as a long meandering stream passage but then plummets down a 58-metre-deep (190 ft) shaft when it meets a shattered fault into which Rift Pot also descends. At the bottom, the stream flows through some low canals and sumps, to eventually emerge at Austwick Beck Head in Crummackdale.

== Description ==
The main entrance to Long Kin East Cave (54°09′11″N 2°21′55″W) is where a small stream sinks into a deepening fissure in a small exposure of limestone rocks located in an extensive area of moorland. The fissure gains a roof and morphs into a walking-sized meandering stream passage, passing an alternative dry entrance at the first corner. After 216 metres (709 ft), the passage passes below a walled-off pothole (54°09′06″N 2°21′57″W) where daylight enters. After a further 43 metres (141 ft) an ascent up a slope of rocks leads to the bottom of the Long Kin East Pot entrance – a 4-metre-deep (13 ft) shaft (54°09′05″N 2°21′56″W).

A route through the boulders at the bottom of the Long Kin East entrance drops into the continuation of the stream passage. This continues for a further 216 metres (709 ft), where it starts to descend a succession of small cascades and pitches. A final cascade leads into a chamber overlooking a 58-metre-deep (190 ft) shaft, at the bottom of which is an elongated rift chamber formed within a fault. Upstream ascends a boulder slope where various routes from Rift Pot enter. Downstream, a mud slope drops into a stream passage, which continues upstream as a series of oxbows that reappear in the chamber. The stream continues low and wide to a junction. Downstream continues to a 20-metre-long (66 ft) sump that emerges in a 25-metre-long (82 ft) canal at the end of which is a second sump. This has been explored for 120 metres (390 ft). Upstream from the junction, a wet crawl reaches some gour pools in a walking-sized passage, before continuing as a crawl which chokes just to the east of Jockey Hole.

A few metres back from the chamber overlooking the main pitch, a bedding traverse in the roof of the passage leads to a high chamber overlooking the shaft. A boulder slope can be followed round the chamber to a rock bridge crossing the rift. A short descent from The Bridge leads into Rift Pot (see below).

The Rift Pot entrance (54°09′05″N 2°22′03″W) is located on the same major fault as is seen underground. The 60-metre-deep (200 ft) shaft of Jockey Hole lies 65 metres (213 ft) further up on the same fault. The entrance shaft drops 34 metres (112 ft) into a large chamber. The chamber is blind to the north, but an ascent of boulders on the south side climbs up into one end of the enormous fault chamber, at the far end of which enters Long Kin East Cave. Two small pitches over boulders lead to a boulder platform below The Bridge, from the top of which a traverse leads back into Long Kin East Cave. From the platform, a variety of routes may be descended to the floor of the chamber, 60 metres (200 ft) below, between the various jammed boulder platforms that partition the chamber. One route which does not descend through the boulders is the 68 Series, which start as a bedding plane passage leading off from a boulder chamber 37 metres (121 ft) above the floor. This complex of passages is about 122 metres (400 ft) long, one branch of which descends a succession of small pitches to finish at a window overlooking the bottom of the chamber some 9 metres (30 ft) above the floor.

Both Rift Pot and Long Kin East Cave have been equipped with resin P-hangers allowing cavers to follow a number of different routes to the bottom using single rope techniques.

== Geology and hydrology ==
The Long Kin East system is a solutional cave formed in Visean Great Scar limestone from the Mississippian Series of the Carboniferous period. The entrance to Long Kin East Cave is close to the limestone margin where a small stream, with a mean flow of about 30 litres per second (6.6 impgal/s), sinks into the limestone. The entrance passage is a meandering vadose canyon which descends gradually following the local southerly dip before reaching the main shaft. This and Rift Pot are formed in the breccia and shear zone of a major fault. Exploration of the phreatic stream passage at the bottom of the shaft has reached a point which is 11 metres (36 ft) above and about 2 kilometres (1.2 mi) distant from the resurgence at Austwick Beck Head in Crummackdale.

== History ==
There is a mention of Long Kin in an article published in The Gentleman's Magazine, by Pastor, known to be a pseudonym for John Hutton, in March 1761, but despite associating it with the nearby Jockey Hole, the description matches neither Rift Pot nor Long East Cave: "There is, likewise, partly south-east, a small rivulet which falls into a place considerable deep, called Long-Kin". It is clear that the first part of Long Kin East Cave had been explored as far as the skylight entrances by 1889, as a paper published in the Leeds Geological Association Transactions says: "these being three fissures connected by a subterranean passage, through which a small stream flows". A detailed description of the cave was given by Balderstone in Ingleton: Bygone and Present, published in 1890, but it seems that he did not reach as far as the two skylight entries. He also describes two surface shafts he called Long Kin Holes. It is clear from the description that one of them was what is now known as Jockey Hole, but the other was the then unnamed Rift Pot, which he plumbed to a depth of 35 metres (115 ft). The hydrological connection between Long Kin East Cave and Austwick Beck Head was established in 1900 using fluorescein by the Yorkshire Geological Society.

Rift Pot was first descended in 1904 by members of the Yorkshire Ramblers Club. The full descent was made over three separate days, with the party being hampered by a large quantity of loose rock. They named the pothole Rift Pot "because of its characteristic form, it being literally a huge vertical rift in the limestone". In 1904 a party the Yorkshire Speleological Association (YSA) including Eli Simpson, dug through the boulders at the bottom of what is now known as Long Kin East Pot, to reach the continuation of the Long Kin East Cave streamway. Two more explorations took place in 1904 and 1905, but it is unclear how far was reached. In 1906 the YSA followed the stream through to the head of the 58-metre (190-foot) shaft which drops in the final chamber of Rift Pot. They also discovered the traverse over the head of the big pitch leading to the top of The Bridge in Rift Pot from where they could discern daylight filtering through from ahead. The connection between the two caves was made in 1908 when a YSA group who had descended Long Kin East Cave hung a ladder from the bridge and joined a party who had descended Rift Pot. The first descent of the big pitch in Long Kin East was made in 1925 by members of the Gritstone Club, when they also produced a survey of the relationship between the two caves. The first mention of the upstream passages was in October 1969 when University of Leeds Speleological Association reported that they had surveyed them in 1967. The 68 Series were explored in 1968 by members of the same club.

The terminal sump was first dived by Dave Yeandle in 1975, but little progress was made in the low visibility. Rick Stanton had three dives in 1987, to reach the current limit without reaching a positive conclusion.
