= Gaping Gill =

Cave in North Yorkshire, England

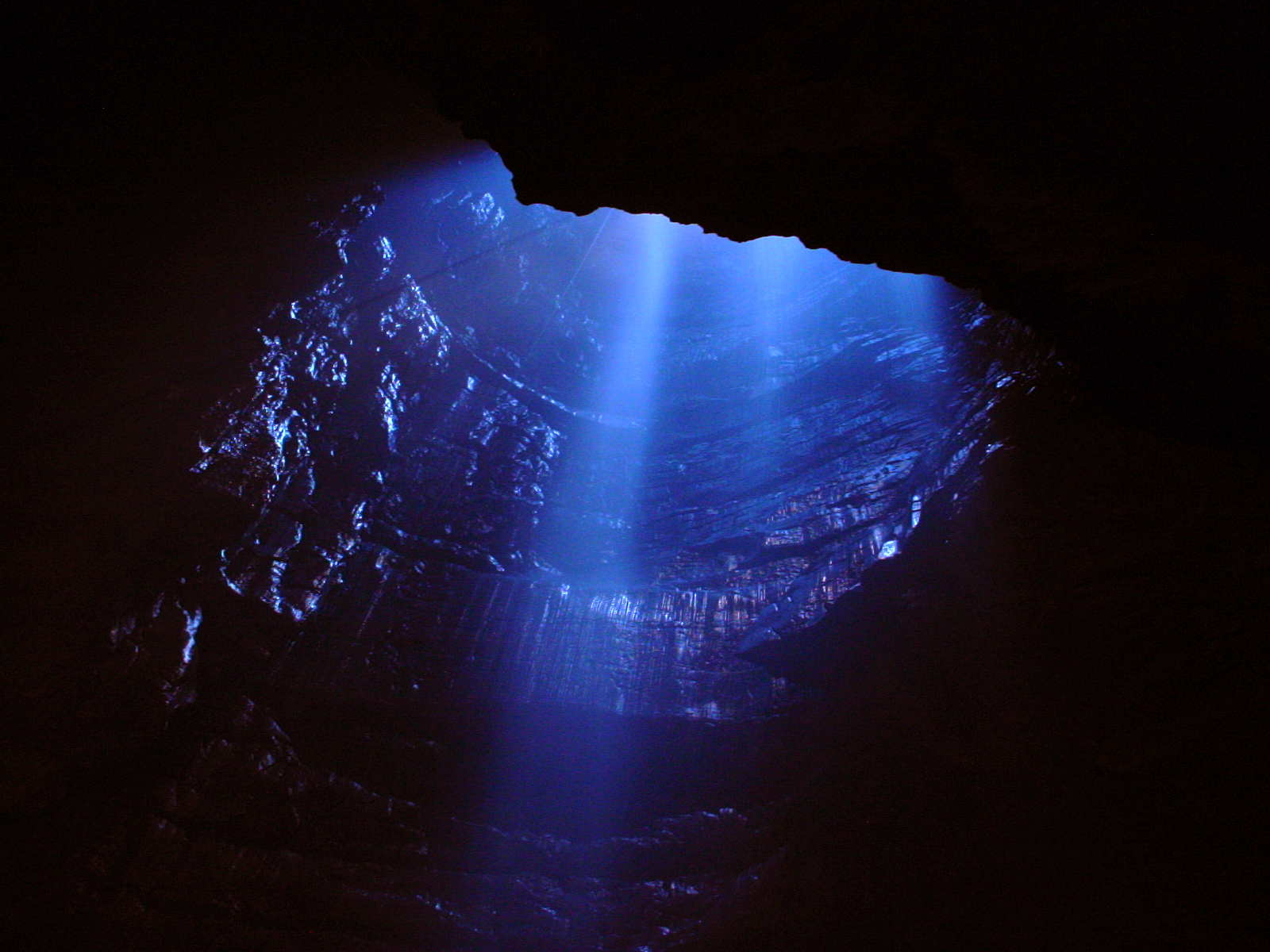
- Entrance shaft viewed from the Main Chamber

- Location within Yorkshire Dales
- Location: Ingleborough, North Yorkshire, England
- OS grid: SD 75117270
- Coordinates: 54°08′58″N 2°22′57″W
- Depth: 192 metres (630 ft)
- Length: 21 kilometres (13 mi) (including Ingleborough Cave)
- Geology: Carboniferous limestone
- Entrances: 21
- Access: Ingleborough Estate Office

Gaping Gill (also known as Gaping Ghyll) is a natural cave in North Yorkshire, England. It is one of the unmistakable landmarks on the southern slopes of Ingleborough – a 98-metre (322 ft) deep pothole with the stream Fell Beck flowing into it. After falling through one of the largest known underground chambers in Britain, the water disappears into the bouldery floor and eventually resurges adjacent to Ingleborough Cave.

The shaft was the deepest known in Britain, until Titan in Derbyshire was discovered in 1999. Gaping Gill still retains the records for the highest freefall waterfall in the UK and the largest underground chamber naturally open to the surface.

== Features ==
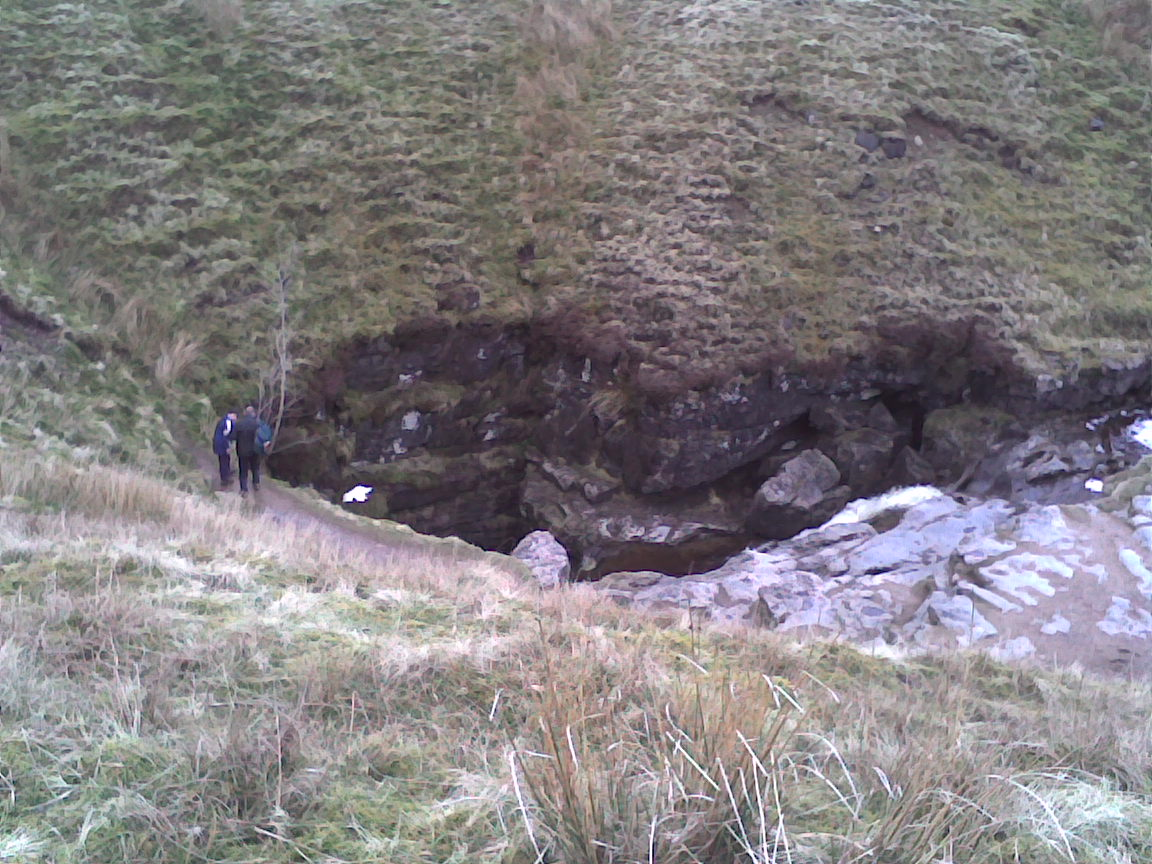
A view of the crater around the mouth of Gaping Gill

Due to the number of entrances which connect into the cave, many different routes through and around the system are possible. Other entrances include Jib Tunnel, Disappointment Pot, Stream Passage Pot, Bar Pot, Hensler's Pot, Corky's Pot, Rat Hole, and Flood Entrance Pot.

The Bradford Pothole Club around Whitsun May Bank Holiday, and the Craven Pothole Club around August Bank Holiday, each set up a winch above the shaft to provide a ride to the bottom and back out again for any member of the public who pays a fee.

A detailed 3D model of the chamber has been created using an industrial laser rangefinder which showed that its volume is comparable to the size of York Minster.

== History of exploration ==
=== Descents ===
The first recorded attempted descent was by John Birkbeck in 1842 who reached a ledge approximately 55 metres (180 ft) down the shaft which bears his name. The first complete descent was achieved by Édouard-Alfred Martel in 1895.

=== Hensler's Crawl and Master Cave ===
On 16 May 1937 Eric Hensler (1907–1991) explored a low passage leading off Booth-Parsons crawl, finding it to be unexplored. This was later named Hensler's Crawl and was also found to lead into Hensler's Master Cave.

=== Since 1937 ===
In 1983 members of the Cave Diving Group made the underwater connection into Ingleborough Cave.

An extreme rock-climb (graded E3, 5c) is possible up the main shaft which requires very dry conditions. It was first pioneered in 1972 with ten points of aid. The first free ascent was made in 1988.

== See also ==
- Caving in the United Kingdom
- List of caves in the United Kingdom
- List of waterfalls
- List of waterfalls in the United Kingdom

== Sources ==
- Beck, Howard M. (1984). Gaping Gill: 150 years of exploration. London: Robert Hale. ISBN 0-7090-1552-6.
- Brook, D.; et al. Northern Caves 2 – the Three Peaks. Dalesman Press. ISBN 1-85568-033-5.
- Farr, Martyn (1991). The Darkness Beckons: History and Development of Cave Diving. Gardners Books. ISBN 0-906371-87-2.
- Mason, E. J. (1977). Caves and Caving in Britain. Robert Hale. ISBN 0-7091-6195-6.
- Dixon, Kevin (2015). Gaping Gill. Geospatial3D. ISBN 978-0-9933481-0-5.
