= Rat Hole, Gaping Gill =

Cave entrance in North Yorkshire, England

Rat Hole
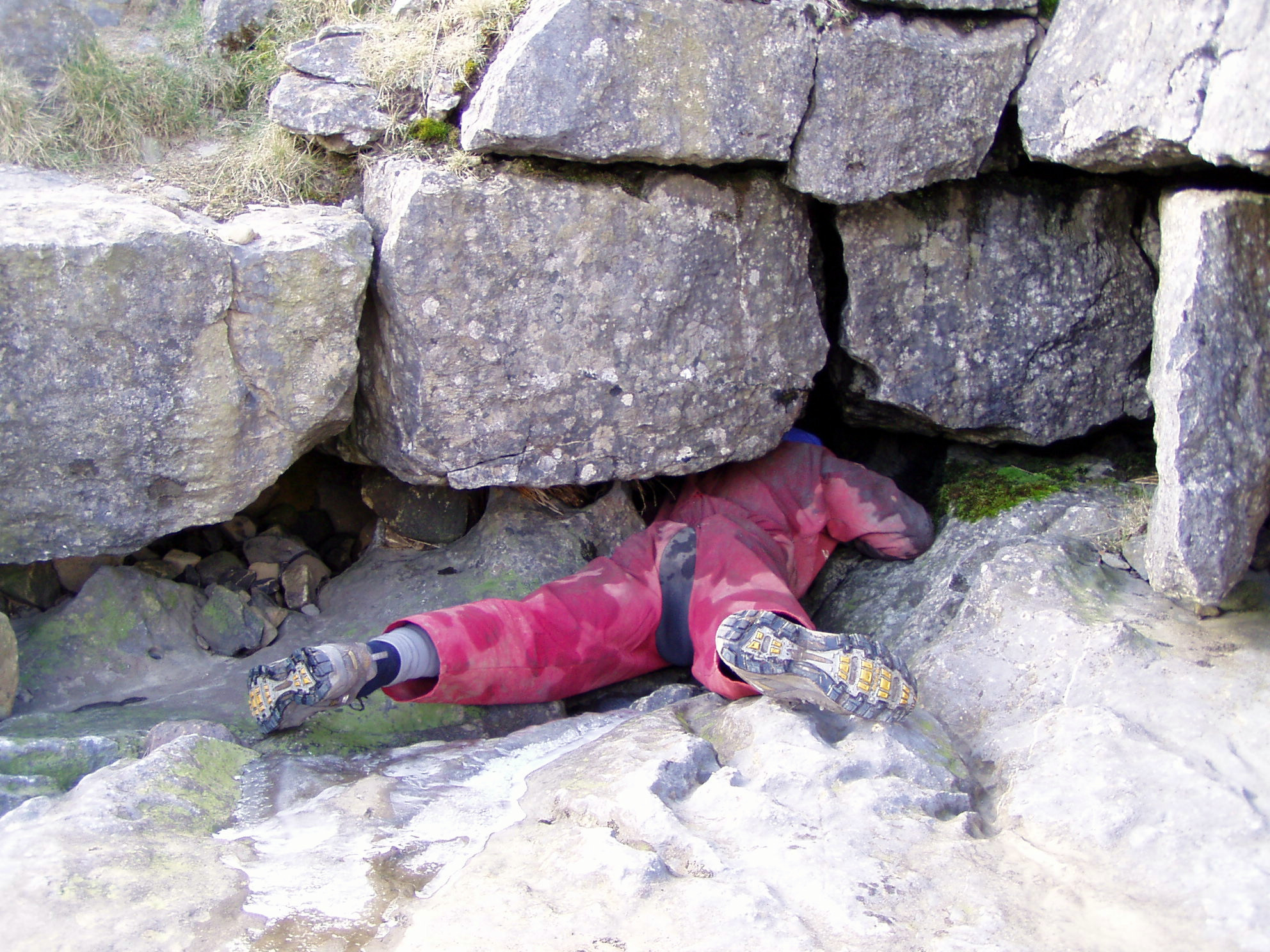
- Entrance to Rat Hole

- Location within Yorkshire Dales
- Location: Ingleborough, North Yorkshire, England
- OS grid: SD 7509 7273
- Coordinates: 54°08′59″N 2°22′58″W
- Depth: 107 metres (351 ft) (To floor of Gaping Gill Main Chamber)
- Length: 200 metres (660 ft)
- Elevation: 403 metres (1,322 ft)
- Discovery: 1909
- Geology: Carboniferous limestone
- Entrances: 2
- Difficulty: V
- Hazards: water, verticality
- Access: Permit

Rat Hole is one of the entrances to the Gaping Gill cave system, located in the north bank of Fell Beck 30 metres (33 yd) upstream of Gaping Gill Main Shaft. A small, awkward, tube-like passage descends into a stream passage, and hence to a 100-metre (330 ft) shaft into Gaping Gill Main Chamber. The sharp and loose nature of the rock, and the quantity of water prevented full exploration for over 80 years, but the current route is described in one guide book as "a technical and exhilarating adventure". It lies within the designated Ingleborough Site of Special Scientific Interest.

== Description ==
Rat Hole is an inlet feeding the Gaping Gill main shaft complex.

A snug crawl of about 25 metres (82 ft) with a few bends passes a couple of minor inlets before dropping down a 3 metres (10 ft) climb. The passage below almost immediately joins a stream passage flowing from the left, carrying the Rat Hole Sink water.

Upstream, easy going leads to the Rat Hole Sink entrance. Downstream leads after a few metres to a 5 metres (16 ft) pitch at the bottom of which the water disappears down a gully, the way on being across some chock stone boulders to the main pitch. A descent of this is objectively dangerous, as it takes all the water and passes areas of sharp, tottering flakes. The current route descends a few metres but then swings into the rift to the east. From here a pendulum traverse leads to a ledge overlooking the impressive adjacent Mousehole (pronounced /ˈmaʊzəl/) shaft.

Above the ledge an aven leads to a small inlet passage. Across the pitch, a traverse leads to a draughting passage which passes under two small avens before becoming too tight.

Mousehole terminates in a floor with a window through to the Gaping Gill rift, but the route deviates to the south and finishes on a large well-watered scoop-shaped ledge after a 49 metres (161 ft) descent. A short traverse to the east leads to the final 35 metres (115 ft) pitch, which lands in the Main Chamber.

Rat Hole Sink is located 10 metres (33 ft) upstream of the main entrance where the water sinks. The entrance is normally covered with a grating. Below this a squirm downwards leads straight into the upstream passage of Rat Hole. When the stream is diverted, Rat Hole Sink provides easier access to the Rat Hole pitches than the traditional entrance.

== History ==
During the Yorkshire Ramblers' Club initial explorations of Gaping Gill the entrance to Rat Hole was buried under a bank of boulder clay, but this had washed clear by 1909. The cave was explored by C. Wingfield and E. Addyman as far as the junction with the main stream, and was surveyed by H. Brodrick and L. Slingsby, and with Wingfield, explored as far as the big pitch. This was plumbed to a ledge 33 metres (108 ft) above the Main Chamber floor in 1912 by Wingfield, which he succeeded in reaching in 1913 by traversing across from Lateral Shaft, which was used at the time for winch descents.

Rat Hole Sink was first identified as a major water sink by the Yorkshire Ramblers' Club in 1912 when they were conducting a survey of Fell Beck, its sinks, and associated passages. It was referred to as both P14 and Rat Hole Sink.

In 1935, Craven Pothole Club took up the challenge of the undescended big pitch and after dragging in over 70 metres (230 ft) of rope ladder with associated lifelines, Arnold Waterfall and Edgar Smith achieved the first descent into Main Chamber, but no one made the ascent.

Interest in Rat Hole then waned, and by 1960 the entrance passage was choked. In 1983 the Craven Pothole Club started to dig out the sink, P14, as well as the entrance to Rat Hole itself, and continued their efforts the following year. P14 was the first to go and was named Rat Hole Sink, and the main entrance succumbed soon after.

An attempt was then made to rig the pitch for SRT. One member started the descent but soon found himself amidst a forest of sharp and loose flakes. He reached the main ledge at −60 metres (−200 ft) and decided to retreat. This plan was foiled when he discovered that the rope had almost cut through 10 metres (33 ft) above the ledge, and he had to return to the ledge leaving some of his ascending gear still attached to the rope. He then had a draughty wait for several hours before someone in the Main Chamber was able to confirm that his second rope reached the floor.

Mike Wooding and John Gardner picked up the baton in late 1985, and in establishing a safer SRT route, discovered the Mousehole shaft which proved to be the key to the modern descent. They entered it about 15 to 20 metres (49 to 66 ft) from the top, and were intrigued by an inlet coming in from the roof. By hanging a rope through a small hole in a calcite chamber above the first pitch they were able to pendulum across at a higher level, and traverse into the inlet series.

The route was P-bolted and straightened up by Mike Wooding in 2004 / 2005, and in doing so he climbed an aven to a small passage above the first stance in Mousehole.
