= Stream Passage Pot =

Cave entrance in North Yorkshire, England

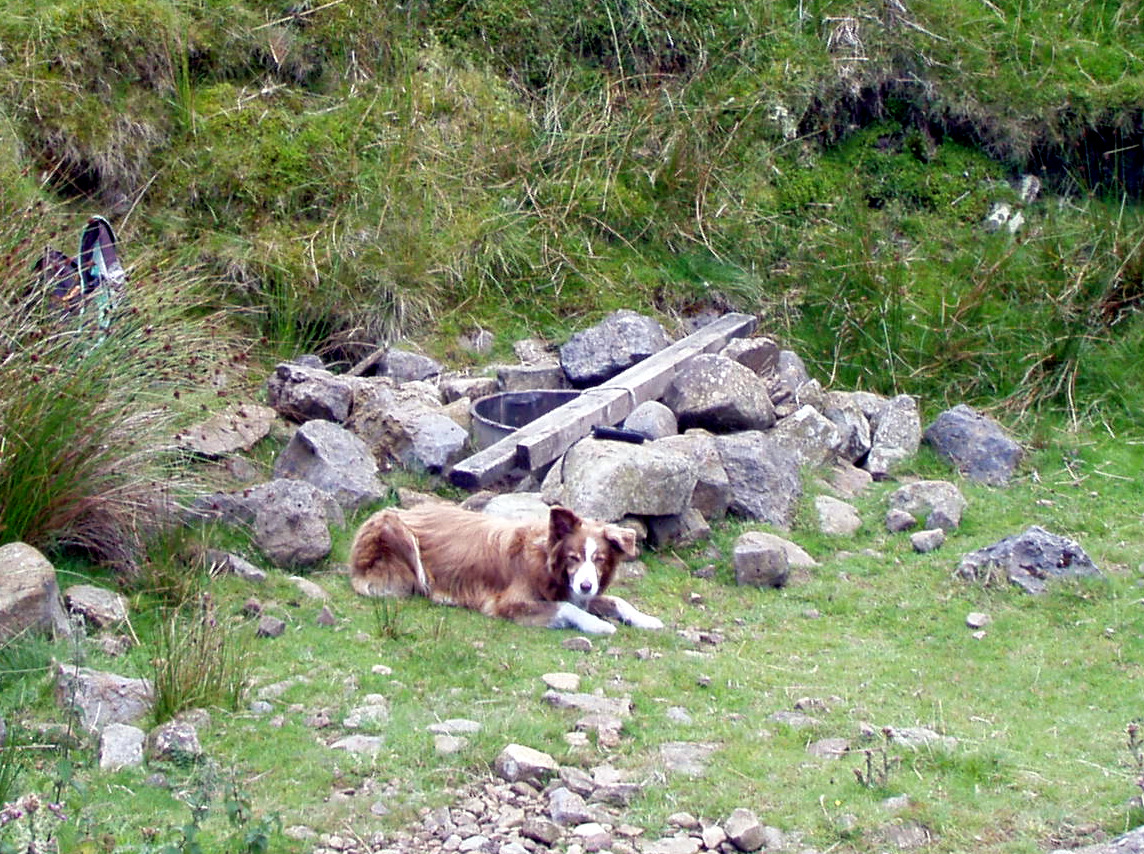
- Entrance to Stream Passage Pot

- Location within Yorkshire Dales
- Location: Ingleborough, North Yorkshire, UK
- OS grid: SD 7484 7252
- Coordinates: 54°08′52″N 2°23′12″W
- Depth: 151 metres (495 ft) (To Mud Pot sump)
- Length: 579 metres (1,900 ft) (To Mud Pot sump)
- Elevation: 415 metres (1,362 ft)
- Discovery: 1949
- Geology: Carboniferous limestone
- Entrances: 1
- Difficulty: IV
- Hazards: verticality, water
- Access: Permit
- Cave survey: 1966 ULSA survey on Cavemaps

Stream Passage Pot is one of the entrances to the Gaping Gill system being located about 320 metres (350 yd) ESE of Gaping Gill Main Shaft. It is a popular and sporting entrance into the system, featuring three well-watered big shafts. It is the highest entrance of the Gaping Gill system, so the full depth of the system, 198 metres (650 ft), is measured from its entrance. It lies within the designated Ingleborough Site of Special Scientific Interest.

== Description ==
Stream Passage Pot is at the end of a blind valley. The water sinks to one side of the valley before the end, and the entrance is through a boulder ruckle down a vertical lined shaft for 6 metres (20 ft). An awkward passage soon terminates in a small pitch 6 metres (20 ft) into a chamber where the stream enters. A high meandering passage from the chamber leads after about 200 metres (660 ft) to an 85-metre (279 ft) deep rift which is descended in three stages. The descent route involves traversing and technical rope rigging to avoid the waterfalls. The last pitch drops into Stream Passage in Gaping Gill.

The water flows through Stream Passage into Stream Chamber. From here a route to the right follows a succession of chambers towards Gaping Gill Main Chamber, but the stream works its way through a boulder ruckle in Stream Chamber to a lower stream passage and the final pitch of 15 metres (49 ft), known as Mud Pot. At the bottom is a sump which has been dived to a depth of 9 metres (30 ft) and distance of 67 metres (220 ft). The water is next seen in the deep pool at the bottom of South-East Pot below the final pitch of Flood Entrance Pot.

== History ==
The cave was dug into on 10 March 1949, and explored by the Northern Pennine Club during the following Easter weekend. The entrance became blocked in the early 1980s, and in 1984 it was re-opened by the Bradford Pothole Club who installed galvanised tubing through the unstable boulder ruckle in the shakehole. The galvanised tube was replaced by the current black poly tube in Summer 2024 after the galvanised pipe had deteriorated.

In November 1979 the cave became the centre of a major rescue when Jeremy Peterson went missing on a solo pull-through trip. He was found alive and well after 57 hours, having gone off route and fallen down the Mud Pot pitch. He had fractured a wrist and was badly bruised, and the only food he had during his ordeal was a Mars Bar. In 1989 Andrea Wynne was rescued after she fell 19 metres (62 ft) when she came to the end of the rope when abseiling down a 34-metre (112 ft) pitch, sustaining head injuries, a fractured arm, cuts and bruises. She subsequently provided an account of her experience.
