= Reservoir Hole =

Cave in Somerset, England

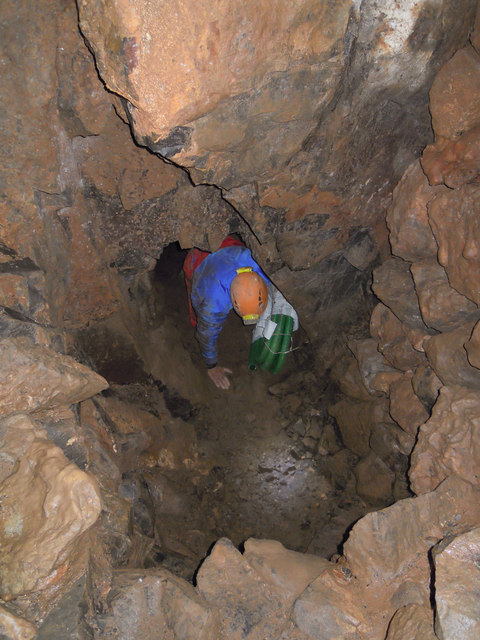

- Location within Somerset
- Location: Cheddar, Somerset, England
- OS grid: ST 47465447
- Coordinates: 51°17′13″N 2°45′17″W
- Elevation: 128 metres (420 ft)
- Geology: Limestone
- Access: Gated; limited
- Registry: Mendip Cave Registry

Reservoir Hole is a cave in Cheddar Gorge in Somerset, southwest England. It contains what is believed to be the largest chamber yet found under the Mendip Hills.

The cave was first dug out in 1951 by members of Wessex Cave Club, and further progress was made in 1965 when "Moonmilk Chamber" was reached with the use of blasting. "Grand Gallery" was discovered in 1969, "Topless Aven" in 1970 and "Golgotha Rift" in 1973.

In September 2012, after four years' work clearing a 100 metres (330 ft) long passage, a group of diggers broke into a new chamber which was found to be 30 metres (98 ft) high and 60 metres (200 ft) long. Prior to the discovery, the largest void under the Mendip Hills was thought to be "Main Chamber" in GB Cave, which is 23 metres (75 ft) high.

Before the find in 2012, the cave was already noted for a number of fine formations, and the newly discovered chamber, which has been named "The Frozen Deep", contains pure-white pillars 5 metres (16 ft) tall, as well as many stalagmites and stalactites.

The possibility of a connection between Reservoir Hole and Gough's Cave, one of the show caves in Cheddar Gorge, has been raised, as the two caves are in close proximity. The stream in Reservoir Hole emerges only a short distance down Cheddar Gorge.

== See also ==
- Caves of the Mendip Hills
