= Fell Beck =

Stream in North Yorkshire, England

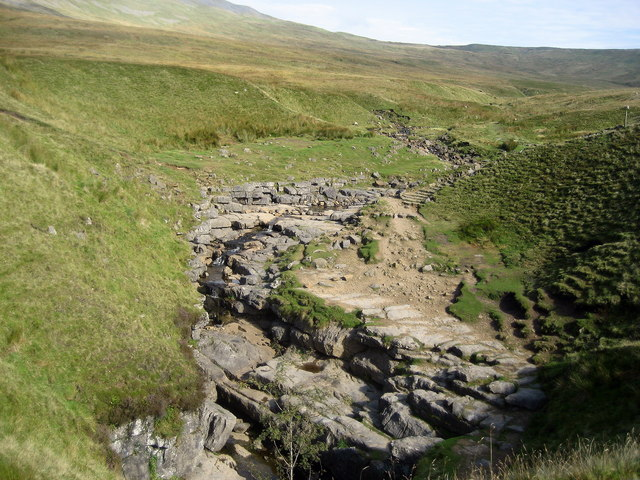
- Fell Beck above Gaping Gill

Physical characteristics
- Mouth
  - coordinates: 54°08′58″N 2°22′57″W

Basin features
- Progression: Wenning, Lune
- River system: Lune

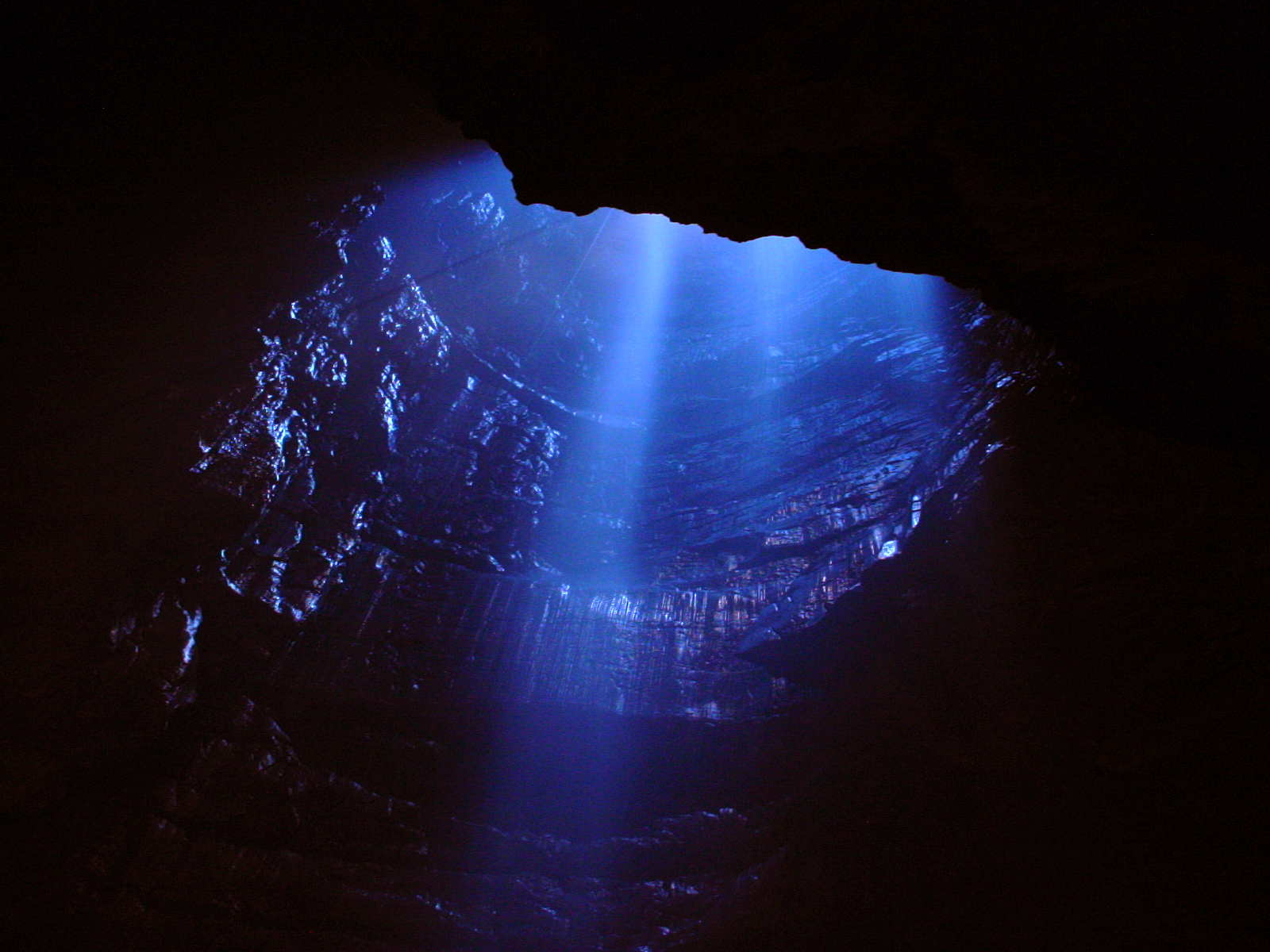
Gaping Gill: the natural cave shaft down which Fell Beck falls

Fell Beck is a stream near the foot of Ingleborough, in the Yorkshire Dales National Park. It is notable for running into Gaping Gill, the second-largest natural cave shaft in the UK (after Titan). As it falls down the shaft for 110 metres (360 ft), it is the tallest unbroken waterfall in the UK. At times it is blocked off by a temporary dam to allow members of the public to descend the Gaping Gill shaft on a winch.

It later emerges as Clapham Beck in Beck Head Cave, adjacent to Ingleborough Cave. This was confirmed by cave divers in 1983, and by fluorescent dye tests many years before. Beyond the village of Clapham, Clapham Beck flows into the River Wenning, which in turn flows into the River Lune and thence to the Irish Sea.
