= Charterhouse Cave =

Cave in Somerset, England

- Location within Somerset
- Location: Charterhouse, Somerset
- OS grid: ST 4774756201
- Coordinates: 51°18′09″N 2°45′03″W
- Depth: 228 m (748 ft)
- Length: 4,868 m (15,971 ft)
- Elevation: 255 m (837 ft)
- Geology: Limestone
- Access: Locked; access by permit with an approved leader; no novices
- Cave survey: The Geological Conservation Review
- Registry: Mendip Cave Registry

Charterhouse Cave, on the Mendip Hills in Somerset, is the deepest cave in southern England.

== History ==
Charterhouse Cave was first excavated in 1972. By 1977 the Sidcot School Speleological Society had reached Bat Chamber, although the first main breakthrough into the system was made in 1982. Active exploration continues and breakthroughs were made in April 2008 when 300 metres (980 ft) of passage big enough to walk through was discovered, and again when the Portal Pool Sump was passed in May 2009 revealing another 500 m (1,600 ft) of passage. Continued exploration in 2010 and 2011 brought the cave to its current length and depth

== Access ==
The cave is situated on land owned by Somerset Wildlife Trust. Because of the various well-preserved formations in the cave, the entrance blockhouse is kept locked and access is restricted to those with permits issued by member clubs of the Charterhouse Caving Company. For the same reason, no novices or cavers aged under 16 are allowed to enter.

== Description ==
The cave has three large chambers, Midsummer Chamber, The Citadel, and Times Square; The Citadel is almost as large as the chambers in GB Cave and Lamb Leer. There are a number of long, fairly straight passages which are approximately 2 m (6.6 ft) across and the same high.

Various parts of the cave contain delicate formations, including Forbidden Passage, Midsummer Chamber, The Citadel, The Grotto of the Singing Stal, and the First and Second Inlets.

When Portal Pool Sump was passed in May 2009, about 500 m (1,600 ft) of new passage was discovered, as well as a number of side-passages. Surveys conducted after the breakthrough in May 2009 show approximately 1,000 m (3,300 ft) of passage, with an estimated 500 m unsurveyed plus a number of leads yet to be explored. The surveys have also confirmed the depth at over 200 m (660 ft).

The stream in nearby GB Cave flows into Charterhouse Cave and ultimately rises near Gough's Cave in Cheddar Gorge, approximately 2 km (1.2 mi) away.

== Fauna ==
There is a hole in the concrete blockhouse over the entrance to the cave to allow the entrance of bats.

The insect life found within the cave is fairly typical of caves on the Mendip Hills, including a number of troglophiles and troglobites such as the freshwater shrimp (niphargus fontanus) and the springtail (onychiurus schoetti).

== See also ==
- Caves of the Mendip Hills
