= GB Cave =

Limestone cave in Somerset, England

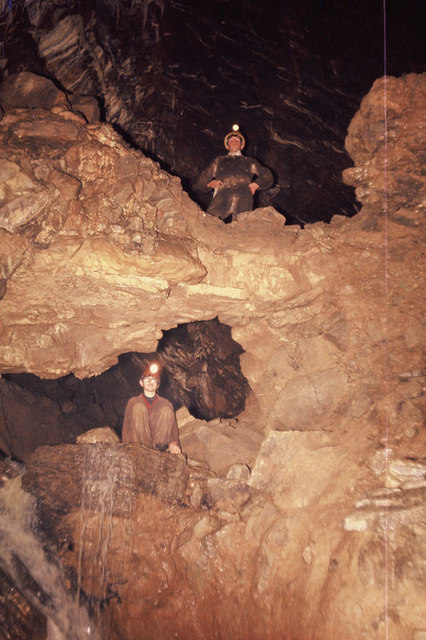

- Location within Somerset
- Location: Charterhouse, Somerset, UK
- OS grid: ST 47595623
- Coordinates: 51°18′10″N 2°45′11″W
- Depth: 134 metres (440 ft)
- Length: 1,950 metres (6,400 ft)
- Elevation: 253 metres (830 ft)
- Discovery: 1939
- Geology: Limestone
- Access: locked
- Cave survey: 1. Bracknell CC (overlaid on map); 2. Geological Conservation Review; 3. UBSS; 4. "GB Cave". Mendip Cave Registry & Archive.
- Registry: Mendip Cave Registry

GB Cave is a cave between Charterhouse and Shipham in the limestone of the Mendip Hills, in Somerset, England.

The cave was first entered on 19 November 1939, after ten months of digging, by the University of Bristol Spelæological Society, and was named in recognition of the two members, F. J. Goddard and C. C. Barker, who had done most of the work involved in its discovery. The cave is located within the Cheddar Complex and the 17-acre GB Gruffy nature reserve and is close to Charterhouse Cave, the deepest cave in the region.

Ladder Dig broke through in 1966 to gain access to the extremely well-decorated Bat Passage.

The entrance to the cave is kept locked, and access is controlled by the Charterhouse Caving Company.

== Description ==
GB Cave is remarkable for the Gorge, a river-passage up to 6 metres (20 ft) wide, 12 metres (39 ft) high and 90 metres (295 ft) long, which opens into the even larger Main Chamber (20 metres (66 ft) wide, 23 metres (75 ft) high, 122 metres (400 ft) long). Together these two form what was thought to be largest known space under the Mendip Hills, until the discovery of "The Frozen Deep" in Reservoir Hole in 2012.

Further into the cave is the Great Chamber, another large space, and a number of other chambers in the cave that are well decorated.

The trace elements magnesium, strontium and barium have been found by laser ablation inductively coupled plasma mass spectrometry (LA-ICP-MS) from three Holocene speleothems taken from the Great Chamber.

== See also ==
- Caves of the Mendip Hills
