= Pridhamsleigh Cavern =

Cave in Devon, England

- Location within Devon
- Location: Ashburton, Devon, UK
- Coordinates: 50°29′51″N 3°45′57″W
- Depth: 55 metres (180 ft)
- Length: 1,100 metres (3,600 ft)
- Geology: Limestone
- Access: Open

Pridhamsleigh Cavern is a cave on the outskirts of Ashburton, Devon, England. It is approximately 1.1 kilometres in length with a total depth of just over 50 metres including Prid II.

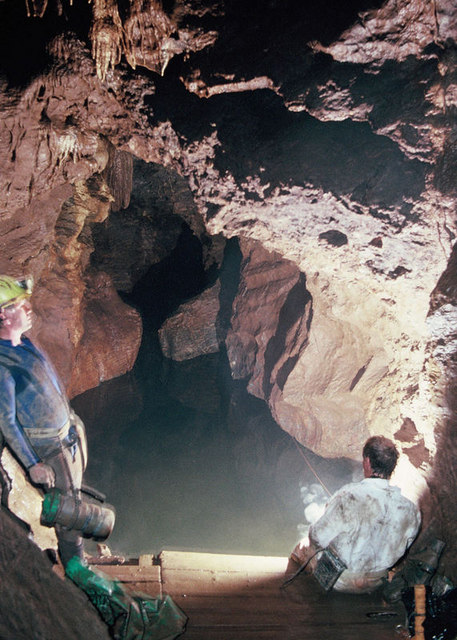
The Lake in Pridhamsleigh - 1995

Pridhamsleigh is a good site for novice cavers, making it quite muddy throughout. It has a large variety of passages which lends itself to longer explorations. Due to the nature of the connecting and unconnecting overlapping phreatic passages in the cave, surveys (maps) of the cave are hard to interpret.

The cave contains 'Bishops Chamber', a wide chamber close to the entrance from where most routes lead, and 'The Lake'. This elongated pool is over 100 feet deep. In the early 1970s divers with SCUBA gear discovered, at a depth of about 80 feet, a window into second partially air-filled chamber, with no passages leading off it. This chamber is the biggest in Devon and is named Gerry's Chamber after its discoverer, the late Gerry Pritchard.

An accurate, hand-drawn, plan of the cave is held in the reference section of Plymouth Library. Although not requiring great skill to explore, the cave is quite complex, there being three distinct routes from 'Bishop's Chamber' to the lake. First-timers should note their route carefully as it is easy to get disorientated.

The cave is the type locality for the 3mm-long, blind white cave shrimp endemic to the south-west of England, Niphargus glenniei (Spooner, 1952).

== Sources ==
- The Complete Caving Manual by Andy Sparrow published 1996
- The Concise Caves of Devon by Tony Oldham published 1986
