= Eli Simpson =

Eli "Cymmie" Simpson (September 16, 1884 – February 1, 1962) was an influential and controversial British caver and speleologist, and a founding member and Recorder of the British Speleological Association.

== Life and career ==
Simpson began caving in 1901, and in 1905 helped create the Yorkshire Speleological Association, the first British club formed specifically for the purposes of exploring caves. Simpson undertook cave exploration, mapping, and photography throughout his active career.

Simpson was a founding member of the British Speleological Association in 1935, became its Recorder for much of its existence, and organized the most extensive cave archive in Britain. The installation of gates on BSA-controlled caves caused much friction with other caving organizations as well as within the BSA. BSA influence waned after 1945 when new or dormant caving clubs (such as Northern Pennine Club and Red Rose Cave and Pothole Club) gained ground, and members expelled or resigned from the BSA went on to create other organizations, notably the Cave Research Group of Great Britain (the two merged in 1973 to form the British Cave Research Association).

== See also ==
- Caving in the United Kingdom
