= Northern Pennine Club =

Caving club in the United Kingdom

Northern Pennine Club (NPC) is one of the oldest and largest caving clubs in the UK. Founded in 1946, the Northern Pennine Club was one of the caving clubs started by various cavers affected by the politics of the British Speleological Association immediately after the Second World War. Whilst the Red Rose Cave and Pothole Club was mainly formed of cavers from Lancaster, the NPC gained many of its members from Leeds.

== Notable discoveries ==
- Penyghent Pot
- Magnetometer Pot
- Hammer Pot
- Echo Pot
- Link Pot
- Notts II

== Publications ==
- Aspin, J., Gemmell, A., Jowett, A. (1952). The Caves of Upper Easegill. Northern Pennine Club, Greenclose House, Clapham, Lancaster LA2 8HW, UK.
- Riley, Malcolm G., ed. (1957). NPC Black Journal. Northern Pennine Club, Greenclose House, Clapham, Lancaster LA2 8HW, UK.

== See also ==
- Caving in the United Kingdom
