= Alloa Lea Quarry Cave =

Cave in Northumberland, England

- Cave
- Location in Northumberland
- Coordinates: 54.991°N 2.497°W
- Grid position: NY683663
- Location: Northumberland, England, UK

Alloa Lea Quarry Cave is a short cave in the Five Yard Limestone of the Alston Block in Northumberland, England. It is situated in an old quarry on the road between Alloa Lea and Walltown. The total length of the cave is 10m.
