= Flood Entrance Pot =

Cave entrance in North Yorkshire, England

- Flood Exit Pot
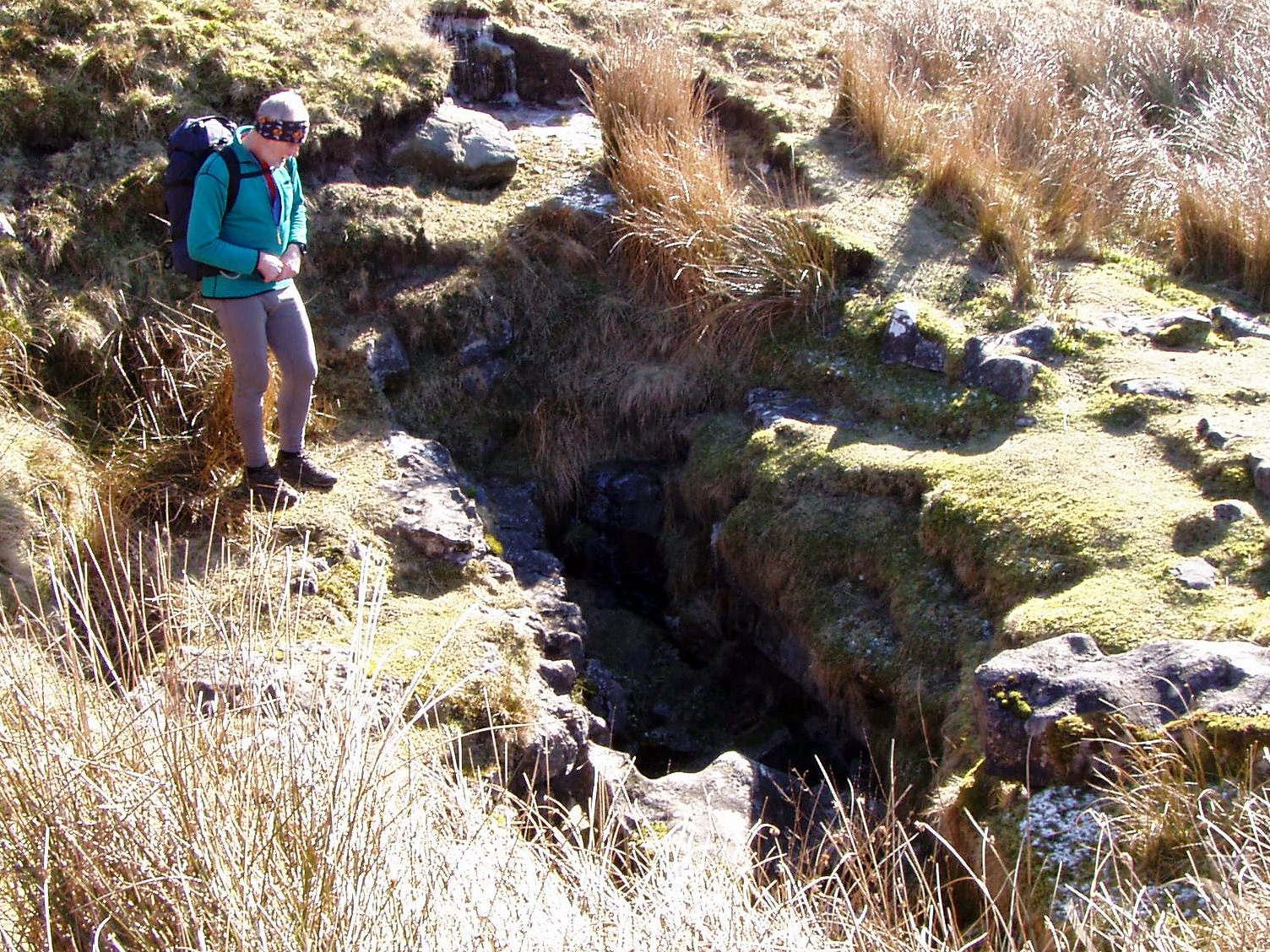
- Flood Entrance Pot Entrance

- Location within Yorkshire Dales
- Location: Ingleborough, North Yorkshire, UK
- OS grid: SD 7513 7242
- Coordinates: 54°08′49″N 2°22′56″W
- Depth: 146 metres (479 ft) (To bottom of South East Pot)
- Length: 248 metres (814 ft)
- Elevation: 396 metres (1,299 ft)
- Discovery: 1909
- Geology: Carboniferous limestone
- Entrances: 3
- Difficulty: IV
- Hazards: verticality
- Access: Permit
- Cave survey: 1980 LUSS survey on Cavemaps

Flood Entrance Pot (sometimes known as Flood Exit Pot) is one of the entrances to the Gaping Gill cave system located about 300 metres (330 yd) south of Gaping Gill Main Shaft. It was the first alternative entrance into the main system to be explored, and it is now a popular entrance into the system, with a fine 38-metre (125 ft) pitch landing in Gaping Gill's South-East Passage. It lies within the designated Ingleborough Site of Special Scientific Interest.

== Description ==
A climb down in the small shakehole soon leads to a tight 15-metre (49 ft) pitch. At the bottom the passage passes beneath the aven where Wade's Entrance joins, and after a further 80 metres (260 ft) it goes round a series of bends to where the last pitch of OBJ Hole enters. There is a chamber after a further 30 metres (98 ft) where a small stream enters from an inlet passage. Downstream a succession of climbs and a 14-metre (46 ft) pitch reach the main pitch of 77 metres (253 ft). South-East Passage in Gaping Gill may be stepped into at the −38 metres (−125 ft) level, but the shaft continues in two stages as South-East Pot to a 29-metre (95 ft) deep pool. This is a window into a large underwater passage, and dye tests have shown that the water from Gaping Gill Main Chamber and from Stream Passage Pot flow through this passage. Above the final shaft there is a tight passage, Horrocks-Stearn Crawl, which connects to Bar Pot above its main pitch.

Wade's Entrance (54.147100°N 2.382525°W) is an alternative entrance 30 metres (98 ft) north-east of Flood Entrance Pot. A 3-metre (10 ft) climb down lands at the top of a 23-metre (75 ft) pitch which drops into the passage a few metres downstream of the Flood Entrance Pot entrance pitch. This is a very much easier than the original entrance, and is the voie normale.

OBJ Pot (54.147352°N 2.383081°W), is a third entrance 80 metres (87 yd) north-east of Flood Entrance Pot immediately to the east of the path. It consists of a free-climbable 4-metre (13 ft) pitch, followed by a 12-metre (39 ft) and an 18-metre (59 ft) pitch which is choked with shingle. The way on is actually at the base of the second pitch where a tight rift leads into an equally tight inlet that enters the roof of the main passage in Flood Entrance Pot.

== History ==
South-East Pot was discovered and free-climbed down to a depth of 15 metres (49 ft) in 1906 by the Yorkshire Ramblers' Club during a Winch Meet. They commented on the high aven above it, which later proved to be the last Pitch of Flood Entrance Pot. The shaft was bottomed in May of the following year.

Flood Entrance Pot was first entered in 1909 by the Yorkshire Speleological Association who were motivated to look for an entrance after finding some flies and a red worm at the bottom of South-East Pot. They concluded that these must have come from the surface having descended the high aven above. It gained its name as it allowed the Gaping Gill system to be entered even when the Main Shaft was in flood.

Wade's Entrance was opened up by the Bradford Pothole Club in 1957. Eric Wade failing to get through the entrance squeeze in Flood Entrance, dug in an adjacent shakehole and got through after getting a voice connection.

OBJ Pot was opened up by the British Speleological Association in August 1949. It took its name from a beer brewed by Dutton's brewery in Blackburn (the initials stand for Oh be joyful). The connection was finally made with Flood Entrance Pot by Bradford Pothole Club in May 2010, who enlarged the rift at the bottom of the second pitch.

In 1980 Lancaster University Speleological Society published a comprehensive survey and description of the cave.
