= British Speleological Association =

- Abbreviation: BSA
- Successor: British Cave Research Association
- Formation: 1935
- Dissolved: 1973
- Region served: United Kingdom

British Speleological Association (BSA) was founded by Eli Simpson and others in 1935. It was instrumental in the discovery of Lancaster Hole and other caves. In 1973, it merged with the Cave Research Group of Great Britain to form the British Cave Research Association (BCRA).

== Publications ==
As a scientific organisation, the BSA published two periodicals between 1947 and 1973, the Journal of the British Speleological Association and the Proceedings of the British Speleological Association.

== See also ==
- Caving in the United Kingdom
