= Oxlow Cavern =

Cave in Derbyshire, England

- Interactive map of Oxlow Cavern
- Location: Castleton, Derbyshire, England
- Coordinates: 53.336166°N 1.813582°W
- Depth: 140 m (460 ft) to West Chamber
- Length: 1.4 km (0.87 mi) (4.75 km (2.95 mi) including Maskill Mine & Giant's Hole)
- Geology: Limestone
- Entrances: 3, including Maskill Mine & Giants Hole
- Access: 17.5 m (57 ft) shaft

Oxlow Cavern is a part-natural and part-mined cavern near Castleton in Derbyshire, England. It is situated on the south side of the road running from the A623 at Sparrowpit to the Winnats Pass, west of Castleton, and is almost opposite Giant's Hole on the other side of the road. A few yards from Oxlow Cavern is the connecting Maskill Mine.

== Description ==
It is a fine "vertical" cave which is dry, deep, and mostly in big passage formed within a mineral vein. Entering via a 17.5-metre (57 ft) mine shaft of small dimensions, which leads down past a mined level, the explorer emerges at the top of a slope in a natural vein cavity. Two further pitches lead down to a col 70 metres (230 ft) below the entrance, where there are two ways on. To the east, a descent continues down into the very large East Chamber, and to the west, the impressive West Swirl Passage leads down at 45° to the base of the fourth pitch and the massive West Chamber. A passage at the far end of West Chamber links through to the bottom of Maskhill Mine. The fourth pitch, which is a climb in the West Antechamber wall, reaches a crawl heading north away from the vein into the New Oxlow Series and the long, very tight and wet connection to Giant's Hole.

== Surveys ==
- JS Beck, A dyeline printed survey published Hitch n Hike, Bamford, Derbyshire
- (PB Chamber) Cave Diving Group Newsletter #107 (p. 30) Apr. 1993
