= Giant's Hole =

Cave in Derbyshire, England

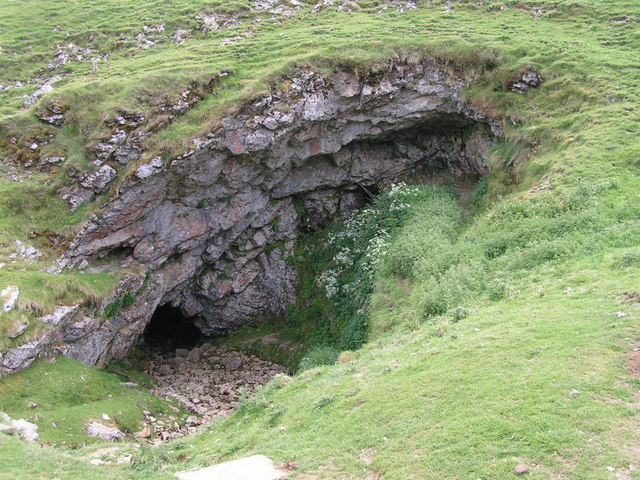

- Location within Derbyshire
- Location: Castleton, Derbyshire
- OS grid: SK1194282685
- Coordinates: 53°20′27″N 1°49′20″W
- Depth: over 120 metres (390 ft)
- Length: over 3 kilometres (1.9 mi)
- Access: No prior permission required but a £3 per caver fee is charged, payable at booth in the parking area
- Cave survey: Giant's Hole Survey

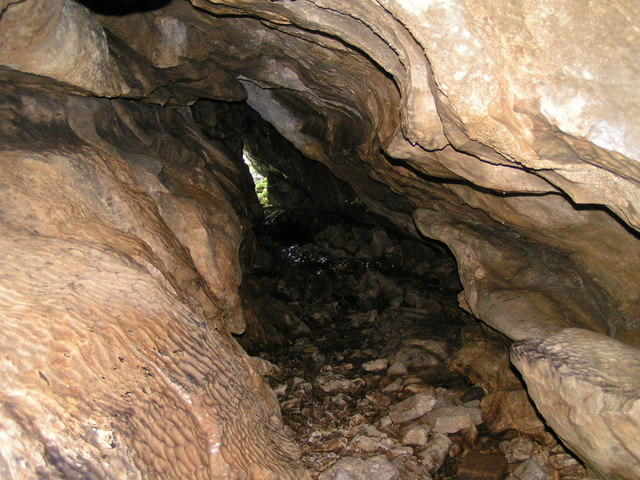
Inside the Entrance Series

Giant's Hole is a well-known cave near Castleton in Derbyshire, consisting mostly of large passages. It is a stream-way cave, and part of the Karst topography of the area.

There is a complex system connecting the cave to Oxlow Cavern and Maskhill Mine to the south. The Entrance Series is easily accessible making it a favourite with novices and groups. The stream that flows into the entrance can be followed through the cave, bypassing three sumps, to the East Canal, Giant's Hole's terminal sump.

There are several major tributary passages and a high-level fossil series that provides an alternative route through the cave and makes up part of the classic "round trip". East Canal has been dived to a depth of 24 metres (79 ft) in drought (but water levels are normally much higher). The connection to Oxlow Cavern is a "serious undertaking" and many cavers have underestimated the difficulty of the passage. Access is permissive, on payment of a fee at a parking area near Peakshill Farm. The cave is within the Castleton SSSI.

Since 2002, the Derbyshire Cave Rescue Organisation has attended 21 callouts to Giant's Hole, one of which resulted in a fatality.
