= Ingleborough Cave =

Show cave in North Yorkshire, England

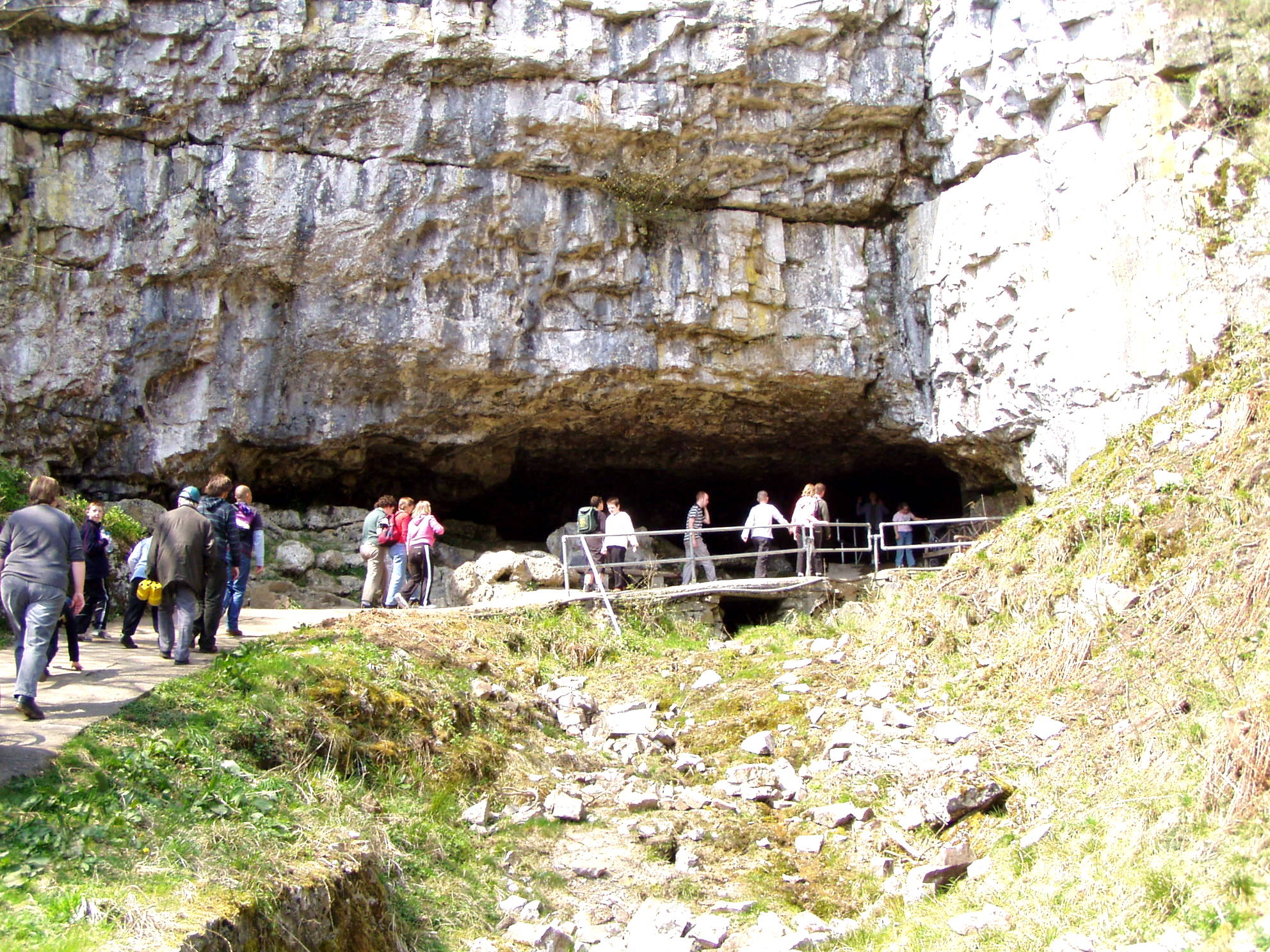
- Ingleborough Cave entrance

- Location within Yorkshire Dales
- Location: Ingleborough, North Yorkshire, UK
- Coordinates: 54°08′06″N 2°22′40″W
- Length: 4,200 metres (13,800 ft)
- Discovery: 1837
- Geology: Carboniferous limestone
- Entrances: 4 (excluding Gaping Gill)
- Entrances list: Ingleborough Cave, Beck Head Cave, Beck Head Stream Cave, Fox Holes
- Difficulty: Grade 4
- Hazards: Flooding (beyond show cave)
- Access: £13 when open. Trips beyond show cave by agreement with management
- Cave survey: cavemaps.org

Ingleborough Cave (formerly known as Clapham Caves) is a show cave close to the village of Clapham in North Yorkshire, England, adjacent to where the water from Gaping Gill resurges.

That part of the cave that is open to the public follows a fossil gallery for some 500 metres (1,640 ft). The passage is spacious, and well decorated with stalagmitic formations.

Beyond the show cave, the fossil gallery continues until it meets the main stream. The water can be followed upstream through passages under Trow Gill, to where it emerges from a sump at Terminal Lake which has been connected by divers to Gaping Gill, and followed downstream into Lake Pluto which has been connected by divers to Beck Head Stream Cave.

A connection has also been made with Fox Holes, a cave near Trow Gill.

A small stream in the show cave drops into a rift called the Abyss. An underwater connection has been made between the passage at the bottom and Beck Head Cave, the resurgence for the Gaping Gill water.
