= Simpson Pot =

Cave in North Yorkshire, England

- Simpson's Pot
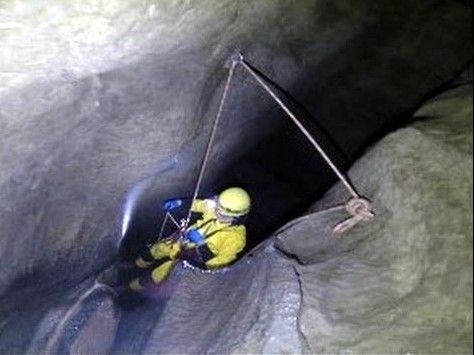
- Descending Stake Pot pitch in Simpson Pot

- Location within Yorkshire Dales
- Location: Kingsdale, North Yorkshire
- OS grid: SD 6962 7787
- Coordinates: 54°11.738′N 2°28.028′W
- Depth: 112 metres (367 ft)
- Length: 884 metres (2,900 ft)
- Elevation: 376 metres (1,234 ft)
- Discovery: 1940
- Geology: Carboniferous limestone
- Entrances: 1
- Difficulty: Grade 4
- Hazards: water, verticality
- Access: Free
- Cave survey: On Cavemapper

Named after Eli Simpson, Simpson Pot is a limestone cave in West Kingsdale, North Yorkshire, England. It leads into Swinsto Cave and thence into Kingsdale Master Cave, and it is popular with cavers as it is possible to descend it by abseiling down the pitches, retrieving the rope each time, and exiting through Valley Entrance of Kingsdale Master Cave at the base of the hill. It is part of a 27-kilometre (17 mi) long cave system that drains both flanks of Kingsdale.

== Description ==
The entrance is in a shakehole, and enters a small active stream passage. This soon enlarges to walking size before plunging down a series of short drops called Five Step Pot. Below here the water drops down a 11-metre (36 ft) deep hole called The Pit, but the voie normale traverses over the hole into a dry series. The passage drops down a couple of climbs and a further two short pitches before arriving at the 9 metres (30 ft) deep Storm Pot, where the stream reappears in the roof. It is possible to follow the water through passages below The Pit.

Below Storm Pot, it is necessary to negotiate a waist deep pool with limited airspace, known as The Blasted Hole. Beyond here the passage enlarges, and descends a further three pitches to arrive at Aven Pot. Two routes diverge at the top of this. The main route descends Aven Pot and soon reaches the 23-metre (75 ft) deep Slit Pot, the top of which is a tight fissure through which it is necessary to force oneself through. At the bottom of this, the passage joins Swinsto Cave, and the combined streams drop down a short climb into Swinsto Final Chamber.

The same point can be reached by traversing over Aven Pot into a dry series where a hole in the corner of a chamber drops 40 metres (130 ft) into Swinsto Great Aven, where a descent of some boulders leads back into Swinsto Final Chamber. The Strike Series, accessed by ascending a 21 metres (69 ft) pitch at one end of the Great Aven, is a complex of passages rising to a height of over 100 metres (330 ft).

== Geology and hydrology ==
Simpson Pot is a karst cave formed within the Great Scar Limestone Group of the Visean Stage of the Carboniferous Period, laid down about 335 Ma. It is a tributary into the West Kingsdale Master Cave System, combining with water from Swinsto Cave, Rowten Cave, Bull Pot, and Yordas Cave which eventually resurges at Keld Head - a kilometre or so to the south. The upper passages follow bedding planes dipping gently towards the north-east until an area of joints are intercepted at Five Steps Pot, where the cave is able to descend rapidly down a series of shafts. Both Swinsto Great Aven and Swinsto Final Chamber are formed on minor faults. The passages above Aven Pot which lead into Swinsto Great Aven are thought to be the original route followed by the Swinsto Cave water, and now left high and dry.

== History ==
The entrance to Simpson Pot was noted by Eli Simpson in about 1910, but it wasn't until 1940 that he showed it to a group from the British Speleological Association, including Bob Leakey. On the first trip Bob Leakey, having left his companion near the entrance, free-climbed Five Steps Pot and traversed across The Pit before being stopped by a 6 metres (20 ft) pitch. The following day the cave was explored as far as the Blasted Hole where the passage appeared to sump. Leakey visited the site on a solo trip, and found a crack above water emitting a strong draught. A party returned and removed the surrounding flake of rock with explosives allowing access to the passage beyond. The connection with Swinsto Cave was made the same day. The Aven Pot extensions which lead to the top of Swinsto Great Aven was found in 1962 by members of the University of Leeds Speleological Association. The Strike Series was entered in 1978 by the Northern Cave Club.

In 1993 Michael Jones was drowned on a through trip between Simpson Pot and Valley Entrance, when the waters rose and he was swept into the Kingsdale Master Cave sump. There have been at least three cases when cavers have had to be rescued after abseiling into The Pit by mistake, and stranding themselves by pulling their rope down. The first was a party of two in 2006, the second was a party of five in 2009, and the third was a solo caver in 2012.
