= Aquamole Pot =

Cave in North Yorkshire, England

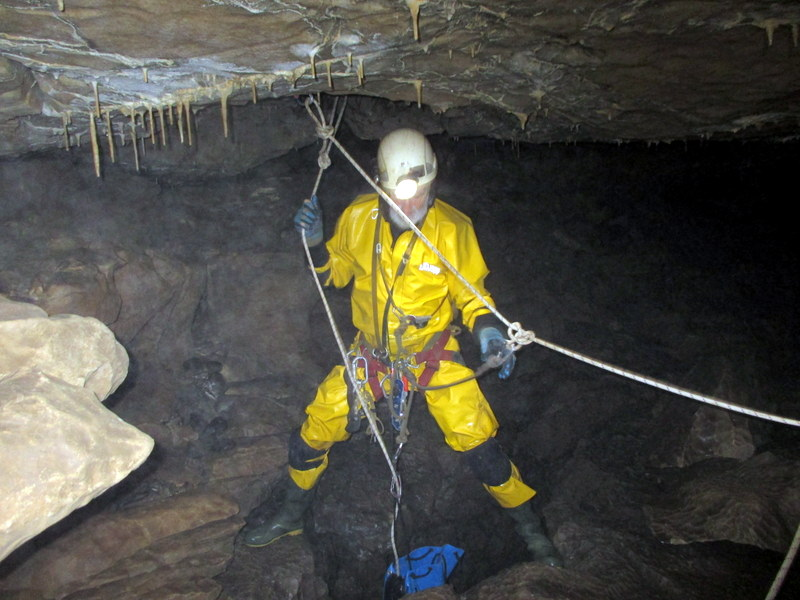
- Descending a shaft in Aquamole

- Location within Yorkshire Dales
- Location: West Kingsdale, North Yorkshire, UK
- OS grid: SD 69926 78338
- Coordinates: 54°12′00″N 2°27′45″W
- Depth: 113 metres (371 ft)
- Length: 158 metres (518 ft)
- Discovery: 1974
- Geology: Carboniferous Limestone
- Entrances: 2
- Hazards: Verticality, water
- Access: Free
- Cave survey: cavemaps.org

Aquamole Pot is a limestone cave in West Kingsdale, North Yorkshire, England. It was originally discovered by cave divers who negotiated 168 metres (551 ft) of sump passage from Rowten Pot in 1974, to enter a high aven above the river passage. All subsequent major explorations were undertaken from below before an entrance was opened up from the surface. It is part of a 27-kilometre (17 mi) long cave system that drains both flanks of Kingsdale.

== Description ==
The entrance is a 60-metre (200 ft) deep shaft, some 40 metres (44 yd) from Jingling Pot, the top section of which is lined with breeze-blocks. Below this a short drop enters a small stream passage which leads after some 50 metres (160 ft) to a 10 metres (33 ft) pitch. This enters a chamber, and a crawl continues which soon descends into a continuation of the stream passage. After a few metres (feet) this opens out at the head of Aquamole Aven - a 40-metre (130 ft) deep shaft that passes a large ledge 5 metres (16 ft) down. At the base of the shaft, downstream quickly leads to a large sump pool, and upstream terminates where a small stream descends from an aven. From the downstream sump a 168 metres (551 ft) dive leads into Frake's Passage in Rowten Pot. The upstream sump has been explored for 920 metres (3,020 ft), with exploration continuing.

A passage above the sump pool has been climbed into a stream passage with water flowing from Green Laids Pot. Three successive avens have been climbed to a point where the way on is too small.

From the large ledge in Aquamole Aven, a small pitch upwards gains access to the One-armed Bandit Series. This starts as a large passage which traverses over a deep hole in the floor, before dividing. To the right a low wet crawl terminates just before the base of Jingling Pot. To the left, a series of large avens have been climbed almost to the surface.

The deep holes in the One-Armed Bandit Series provide a second route to the sump, and starts with a 24-metre (79 ft) deep shaft. A steeply descending rift then leads to an 11 metres (36 ft) pitch which drops into the sump pool chamber.

== Geology and hydrology ==
Aquamole Pot is a karst cave formed within the Great Scar Limestone Group of the Visean Stage of the Carboniferous Period, laid down about 335 Ma. It is basically a window into the West Kingsdale drainage phreas, with water from Yordas Cave and Bull Pot flowing through the sump at the bottom to eventually resurge at Keld Head - some 1.8 kilometres (1.1 mi) away. It is likely that water from the nearby Jingling Pot originally flowed through the One-armed Bandit Series, and was the major feeder of Aquamole Aven. This water has since been captured by Jingling Caves.

== History ==
The bottom of the cave, Aquamole Aven was discovered by Geoff Yeadon and 'Bear' Statham in 1974 after diving the upstream sump at the bottom of Rowten Pot. They started to bolt up the aven which now leads into the One-armed Bandit Series, but retired after reaching a height of 9 metres (30 ft). A team returned in 1980, and they used bolting equipment to complete the climb. They then climbed up the rift at the top to reach the bottom of the 24-metre (79 ft) aven. Scaling poles were taken through the sumps by a large team, and its ascent was completed in two trips. The passage towards Jingling Pot was explored, and a series of avens climbed which reached near the surface. The upstream junction in the One-armed Bandit Series was radio-located and was found to be found to be 55 metres (180 ft) from Jingling Pot.

Work restarted in 2000 when cave diver Rupe Skorupka who was keen to find easier access when pushing the upstream sump, scaled Aquamole Aven to a height of 50 metres (160 ft) with Martin Holroyd. It pinched out, but they were able to gain access to a second series of inlet passages, the top of which was radio-located to a point 10 metres (33 ft) below the surface. This was finally connected to the surface in June 2002.
