= Swinsto Cave =

Cave in North Yorkshire, England

- Swinsto Hole
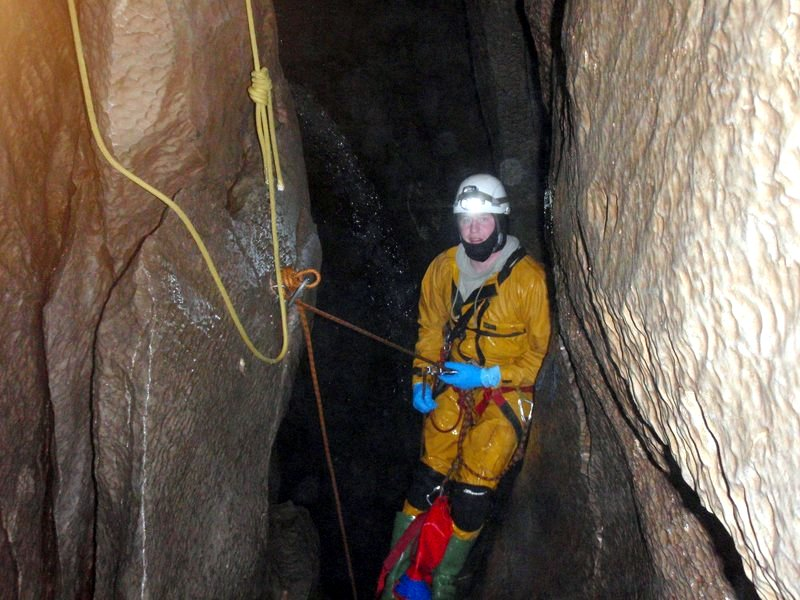
- A caver descending Spout Pitch in Swinsto Cave

- Location within Yorkshire Dales
- Location: Kingsdale, North Yorkshire
- OS grid: SD 6938 7753
- Coordinates: 54°11.559′N 2°28.239′W
- Depth: 131 metres (430 ft)
- Length: 914 metres (2,999 ft)
- Elevation: 384 metres (1,260 ft)
- Discovery: before 1890
- Geology: Carboniferous limestone
- Entrances: 3 (including Simpson Pot and Turbary Pot)
- Difficulty: Grade 4
- Hazards: water, verticality
- Access: Free
- Cave survey: On Cavemapper

Swinsto Cave is a limestone cave in West Kingsdale, North Yorkshire, England. It leads into Kingsdale Master Cave and it is popular with cavers as it is possible to descend by abseiling down the pitches, retrieving the rope each time, and exiting through Valley Entrance of Kingsdale Master Cave at the base of the hill. It is part of a 27-kilometre (17 mi) long cave system that drains both flanks of Kingsdale.

== Description ==
The entrance is in a shakehole, and enters a small active stream passage. This soon enlarges to walking size before reaching a 6 metres (20 ft) pitch with water entering from one side. Below a 234-metre (768 ft) long passage (The Long Crawl) which has some flat-out wet sections, leads to a short second pitch. Below this a succession of three pitches rapidly descends to a spray-lashed chamber. A little beyond here the 143-metre (469 ft) long Turbary Inlet enters from the right. At the end of this an excavated rift leads up into McShea Chamber in Turbary Pot, an alternative entrance. The main passage continues, descending a number of cascades and a further two small pitches, before entering a larger area where the water from Simpson Pot enters from on high on the left. The combined streams drop down a short climb into the boulder-strewn Swinsto Final Chamber, with Swinsto Great Aven soaring 45 metres (148 ft) above a steep boulder slope, to a second connection with Simpson Pot at the top. Kingsdale Master Cave can be reached from two different passages. On the true left of the waterfall a descent through boulders leads into Philosopher's Crawl, and on the other side of the chamber a climb down over boulders leads into East Entrance Passage.

== Geology and hydrology ==
Swinsto Cave is a karst cave formed within the Great Scar Limestone Group of the Visean Stage of the Carboniferous Period, laid down about 335 Ma. It takes the water of Swinsto Hole Syke, and is a tributary into the West Kingsdale Master Cave System, combining with water from Simpson Pot, Rowten Cave, Bull Pot, and Yordas Cave to eventually resurges at Keld Head – a kilometre or so to the south. It is considered to be a classic example of a down-dip vadose cave descending in steps to a phreas. The upper passages follow bedding planes dipping gently towards the north until an area of joints is intercepted, where the cave descends rapidly down a series of shafts. At a level of about −65 metres (−213 ft) the passage intercepts an older phreatic system, within which the stream has incised a vadose canyon. Both Swinsto Great Aven and Swinsto Final Chamber are formed on minor faults.

== History ==
The first mention of the cave is by Balderstone in Ingleton Bygone and Present, published in 1890, where he accurately describes how it is possible to traverse the cave for 33 yards before encountering "a deep wide hole, with high vaulted roof, fine cone-like stalactites, and waterfall thirty feet high". In 1908 a party from the Yorkshire Ramblers Club descended the pitch and explored the way on for about 90 metres (300 ft) before turning back when the route ahead became low and wet. The baton was not picked up for over 20 years, but in 1930 a party from the Gritstone Club finally reached the bottom after a long siege lasting a year and many trips, the key to their success being the lowering of water levels in The Long Crawl. Simpson Pot was explored through to Swinsto Cave in 1948 by members of the British Speleological Association. Turbary Inlet was first explored by a party from the University of Leeds Speleological Association (ULSA) in 1962, and the connection made with Turbary Pot by Andy Jones, Darren McKenzie and Dave Ramsay in 2020. The route to Kingsdale Master Cave was first entered in November 1965 when a party from ULSA dug out a choke in Final Chamber, into what became known as Philosopher's Crawl.

Michael Midgley died when descending the cave after falling 15 metres (49 ft) down a pitch on 9 September 1971.
