= Jingling Pot =

Cave in North Yorkshire, England

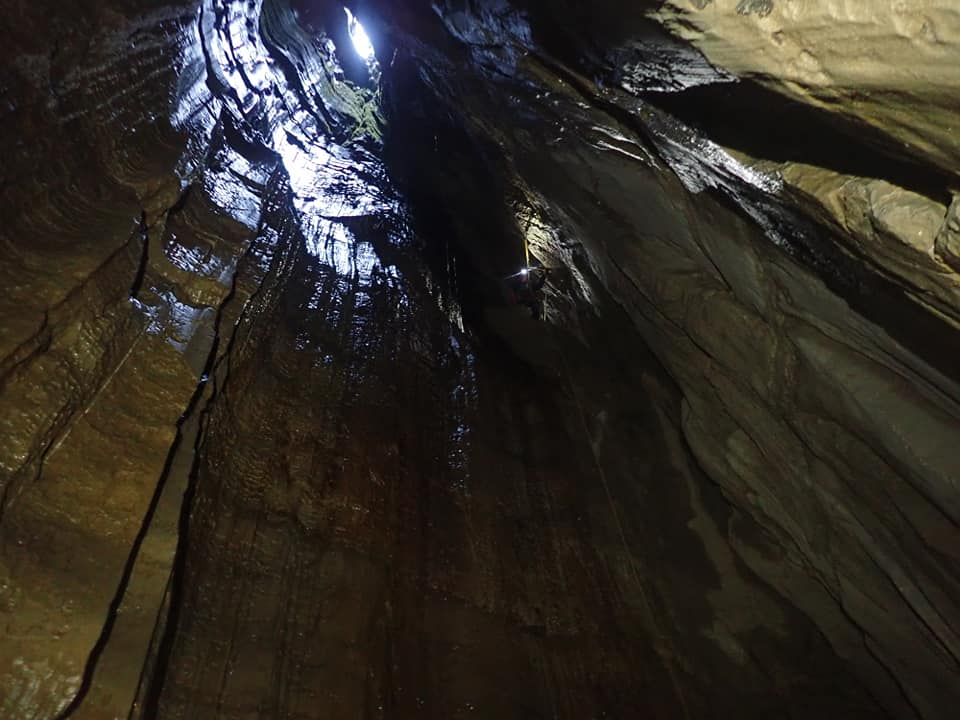
- Looking up the entrance shaft of Jingling Pot

- Location within Yorkshire Dales
- Location: West Kingsdale, North Yorkshire, UK
- OS grid: SD 69896 78369
- Coordinates: 54°12′01″N 2°27′46″W
- Depth: 67 metres (220 ft)
- Length: 61 metres (200 ft)
- Discovery: 1867
- Geology: Carboniferous Limestone
- Entrances: 1
- Hazards: Verticality
- Access: Free
- Cave survey: cavemaps.org

Jingling Pot is a limestone cave in West Kingsdale, North Yorkshire, England. Located adjacent to Jingling Beck, it is a lenticular-shaped 45-metre (148 ft) deep shaft that descends straight from the surface. At the bottom the rift extends to the north and descends steeply into a further chamber, at the end of which the initials of the original explorers may be seen scratched into the rock. A narrow shaft in this second chamber drops into a complex of small crawls and rifts, which approach close to a passage in the One-armed Bandit Series of Aquamole Pot. A second set of shafts descend parallel to the surface shaft. These can be entered through a rock window a little way below the entrance.

== Geology and hydrology ==
Jingling Pot is a karst cave formed within the Great Scar Limestone Group of the Visean Stage of the Carboniferous Period, laid down about 335 Ma. It is formed on what is thought to be a strike-slip fault with minimal displacement by the waters of Jingling Beck, which now bypass the entrance except in exceptionally wet weather. The water probably originally flowed through to the One-armed Bandit Series in Aquamole Pot, and thence down to the West Kingsdale main drain.

== Jingling Cave ==
A few metres to the north-west of Jingling Pot, the water of Jingling Beck sink into Jingling Cave. Jingling Cave is about 375-metre (1,230 ft) long. Initially low, and requiring crawling, it gradually increases in height, passing under a couple of windows where the roof has collapsed. After a damp 3 metres (9.8 ft) climb down, the passage enters the much larger Rowten Caves.

== History ==
The first reference to Jingling Pot was by John Covel (1638-1722) who wrote in a description of his travels that he was "particularly pleased with Gingling Cove and Reeking Cove near Ingleton, which outdoe Oakey Hole in Somersetshire, and all the wonders of the Peak". The next reference appeared in verse in Thomas Dixon's A Description of the Environs of Ingleborough of 1781:

"Near which are seen the clefts of GINGLING-COVE
The form and depth the curious ne'er could prove;
The falling stones from rock to rock rebound,
The dark abyss returns a tinkling sound."

A more prosaic description was provided by John Hutton in 1784 in an Appendix to Thomas West's "A Guide to the English Lakes": "This natural curiosity is a round aperture: narrow at the top, but most probably dilating in its dimensions to a profound depth. The stones we threw in made an hollow gingling noise for a considerable time." Balderstone reports in 1890 that he had plumbed it to a depth of 141 feet (43 m), and he also describes with great accuracy Jingling Cave which he claims to have explored for 225 yards (206 m).

The first descent of Jingling Pot was made in June 1897 by members of the Yorkshire Ramblers Club. The set of shafts parallel to the surface shaft were first explored by members of the Grampian Speleological Society in 1969.
