= Therion (software) =

Open-source cave-surveying software package

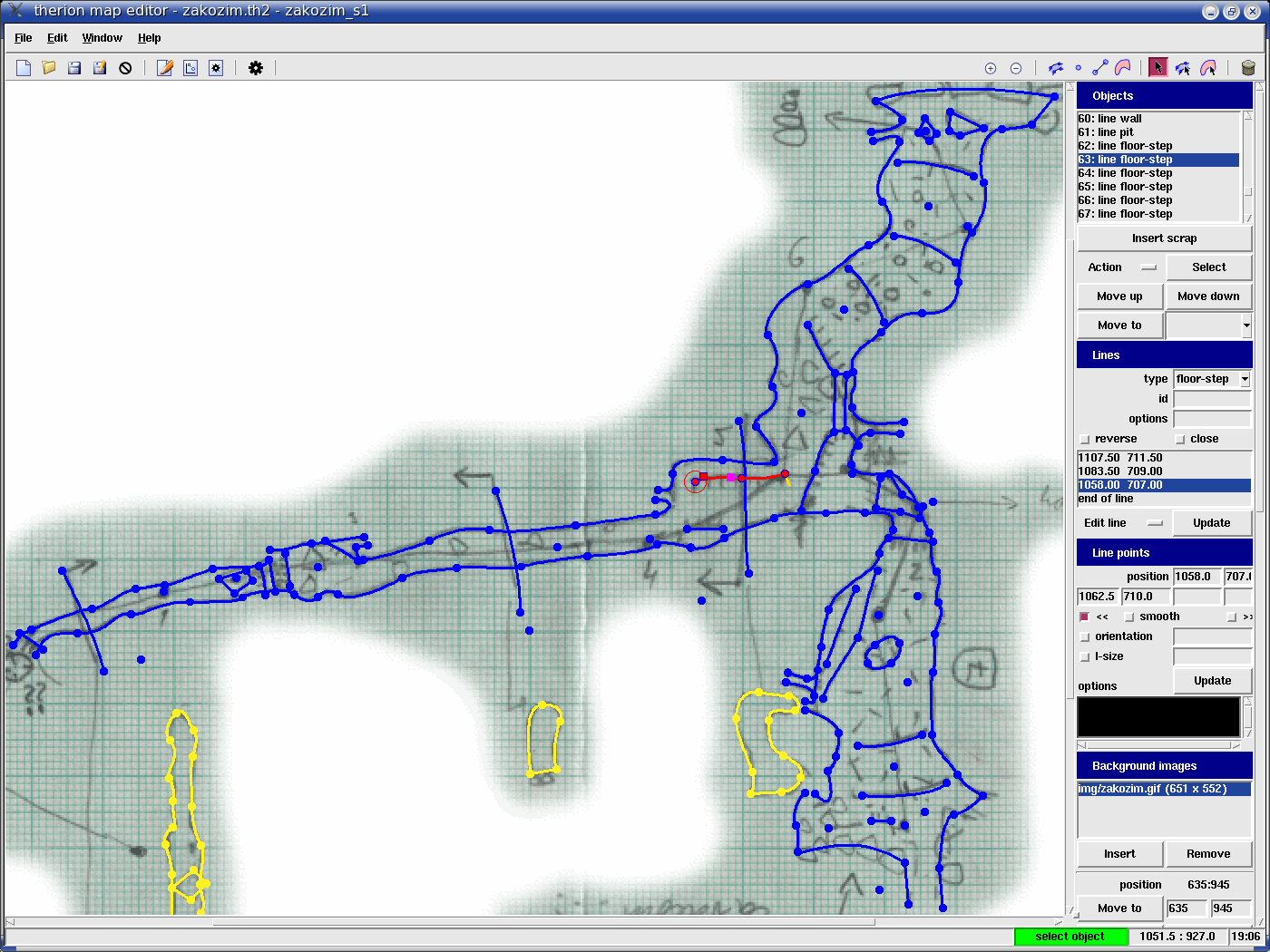
- Developers: Martin Budaj and Stacho Mudrák
- Stable release: 6.2.1. / March 20, 2024; 2 years ago
- Written in: Metapost, TeX, C++, Tcl/Tk; (therion-viewer: wxWidgets)
- Operating system: Microsoft Windows, Mac OS X and Unix-like
- Size: 46 MB Windows
- Available in: 18 languages
- Type: Cave surveying
- License: GNU General Public License
- Website: therion.speleo.sk

Therion is free and open-source cave surveying software designed to process survey data, generate maps and 3D models of caves, and archive the data describing the cave and the history of exploration.

Therion was developed by the Slovak cavers Martin Budaj and Stacho Mudrak but is available in English. It runs on a wide variety of platforms including Linux, Windows and Mac OS X. Therion is available as part of standard distribution of Debian and Ubuntu (operating system) Linux distributions.

It is free software, released under the terms of GNU GPL, with source code available. It does not require any other commercial software to run. The format of all files is human readable plain text (excluding 3D models), which semantically describe the cave, and are compiled by the program into various output forms such as 2D PDF or SVG maps, or 3D models. Other files like map overlays, terrain models and pictures can be incorporated into the output. A graphical editor is provided to help with the drawing process, and a 3D viewer ('loch') for viewing the models. Survex is used for the centreline error distribution if installed.

The separation of drawing/semantic data entry and output rendering makes the program both complex to learn to use, but also capable of dealing with cave systems still being explored, where new finds and surveys need the drawing to morph to fit. It also allows a survey to be rendered with different national cave-symbol sets.

The (UK-based) Cave Surveying Group has been using Therion along with PocketTopo and DistoXs to train cavers and improve the quality of surveying by the use of real time measurement that is available in Paperless surveying.

Therion is used in several large projects for the documentation of cave systems. It is listed among 10 of the Best Free Linux Earth Science Software. It was used in a number of scientific projects.

Not everyone finds the results satisfying: "Beginning in 2003, the Mulu Caves Project attempted to use Therion on several cave surveys. After many attempts over several years by many different cave surveyors, one of whom was closely affiliated with the software itself, no aesthetically pleasing results were produced."

The unmatched feature of Therion software among other software tools for cave surveying is straightforward creating of 3D presentation for WEB pages. One may export 3D model from Therion to 3D format .lox, open it in Therion's 3D viewer Loch and export data as VTK. ParaView software is able to open such data and export them in WebGL format.

To draw the maps the Speleo-Vulcain group from France is using Visual Topo for simple systems. However, because of the difficulties to build a rigorous synthesis and to update the survey of the complex Jean-Bernard System, they passed to the open source software Therion.

Therion was analysed and used in thesis of Eliška Rákocy.

Two articles in the Annual Report of Cave Administration of the Czech Republic 2010 describe how Therion was used to document the Javoříčko Caves show cave.

Described as "State of the Art Cave-Drawing software", Therion was reviewed in Compass, the Cave Surveying Journal of The British Cave Research Association. The review covered installation, use and development of the software. Since that article, written in 2004, Therion has continued to be developed and is now considered to be the most capable cave drawing software available.
