= Rowten Pot =

Cave entrance in North Yorkshire, England

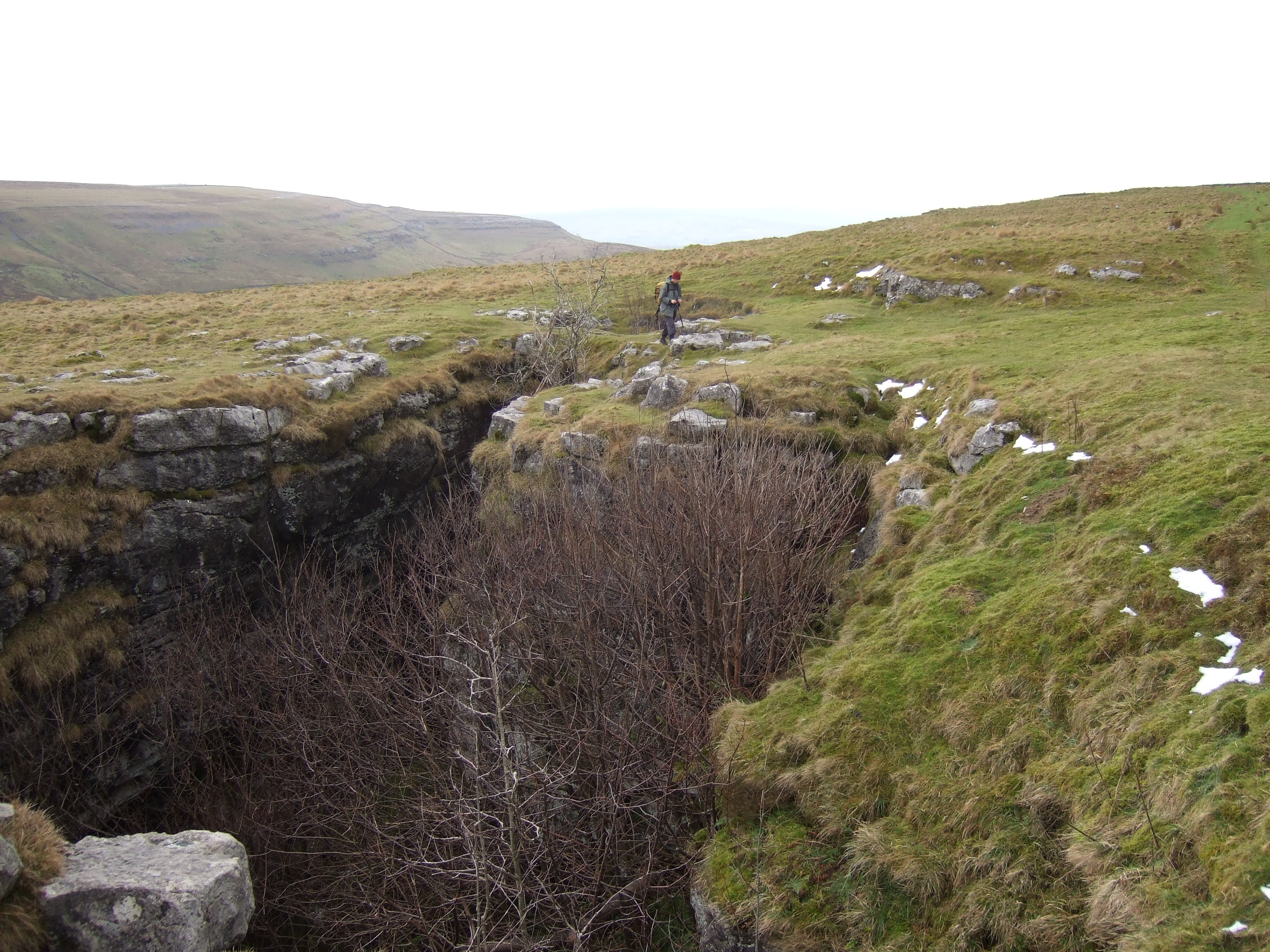
- Entrance shaft looking south

- Location within Yorkshire Dales
- Location: Kingsdale, North Yorkshire, UK
- OS grid: SD 6982 7803
- Coordinates: 54°11′49″N 2°27′51″W
- Depth: 105 metres (344 ft)
- Length: 259 metres (850 ft)
- Discovery: first descent July 1897
- Geology: Carboniferous limestone
- Difficulty: Grade 4
- Hazards: water, verticality
- Access: Free
- Cave survey: cavemaps.org

Rowten Pot is one of several entrances into the 27-kilometre (17 mi) long cave system that drains Kingsdale in North Yorkshire, England. Its entrance is a shaft some 27 metres (89 ft) long, 10 metres (33 ft) wide, and at the southern end 72 metres (236 ft) deep.

== Description ==
A stream enters from just below the surface at the northern end. The cave is largely vertical, but at the bottom the stream flows through a short section of passage into the underground West Kingsdale river. This connects downstream with the Kingsdale Master Cave through three short sumps. Upstream, longer sumps may be followed up the valley for over 1 kilometre (3,300 ft), passing below the final pitch of Aquamole Pot.

The cave is usually descended using single rope techniques, and is popular with cavers, being spacious and offering a variety of aerial routes. The three short sumps which connect to the Kingsdale Master Cave can be free-dived.

The water which descends Rowten Pot sinks 150 metres (490 ft) to the west of the pot on the other side of Turbary Road, into a shallow horizontal cave system, known as Rowten Caves. This can be followed past a junction where Jingling Cave enters, through to where it emerges in Rowten Pot a few metres below the moor.

Other nearby caves which also connect to the West Kingsdale System include Swinsto Cave, Simpson Pot, Aquamole Pot and Valley Entrance.

== History ==
The first description of Rowten Pot appeared in verse in Thomas Dixon's A Description of the Environs of Ingleborough of 1781:

The Routing-Chasm amazing to behold,
With dreadful yawn intimidates the bold:
The depth unknown, vast, dismal, dark and wide,
With rugged pointed rocks on every side;
A rapid stream falls in with hideous roar,
Growls thro the mountain to some distant shore:
Dismay arrests the man that ventures near,
His face turns pale, his courage yields to fear.

In a guide book published in 1865, there is an account of a Mr. Hunter claiming to have made a complete descent, but the account is exaggerated and bears little resemblance to reality. It is likely, however, that the gully had been descended to the start of the vertical descents. A considered description appears in Balderstone's 1890 Ingleton, Bygone and Present, where it was variously given the names of Rowantree Gulf, Rowting Hole, and Rowton Holes. Balderstone also claims to have explored down the gully to a depth of 30 metres (98 ft). It was first fully descended to the sump by a Yorkshire Ramblers' Club party in June 1897. It was not linked with Kingsdale Master Cave through the downstream sump, however, until July 1966, shortly after the discovery of the latter.

In 1939 the second recorded Yorkshire Dales caving fatality occurred in Rowten Pot. John Lambert initially fell a few feet and was made comfortable on a ledge by his companions. Water levels then rose and he either fell or was washed off down a 15 metres (49 ft) drop and died. Such was the effort required to rescue Lambert's companions, who were trapped by water in the shaft, that the BBC broadcast an appeal for any available potholers to help.

The first fatality for the Cave Rescue Organisation on a rescue occurred here in 1986, when Dave Anderson slipped from a traverse into a gully near the bottom of the last pitch when searching for two missing cavers, and drowned under the force of the water.

An accident in 1989 involving a threaded and worn out anchor on the entrance shaft which resulted in a broken back, hastened the development and installation of permanent anchors in popular UK caves.
