= List of UK caving fatalities =

This is a list of recreational caving fatalities in the United Kingdom. It includes all verified deaths associated with the exploration of natural caves and disused mines in the modern era (post 1880). Deaths involving members of the general public who may have slipped down a shaft, or wandered into a cave without being aware of the risks, have been excluded.

When cave diving is excluded, caving cannot be considered a particularly dangerous pastime. In 2018, there were up to 4,000 regular cavers in the UK, and about 70,000 people who went on instructor-led courses into caves in the Yorkshire Dales, but there were no fatalities.

== List of fatalities ==
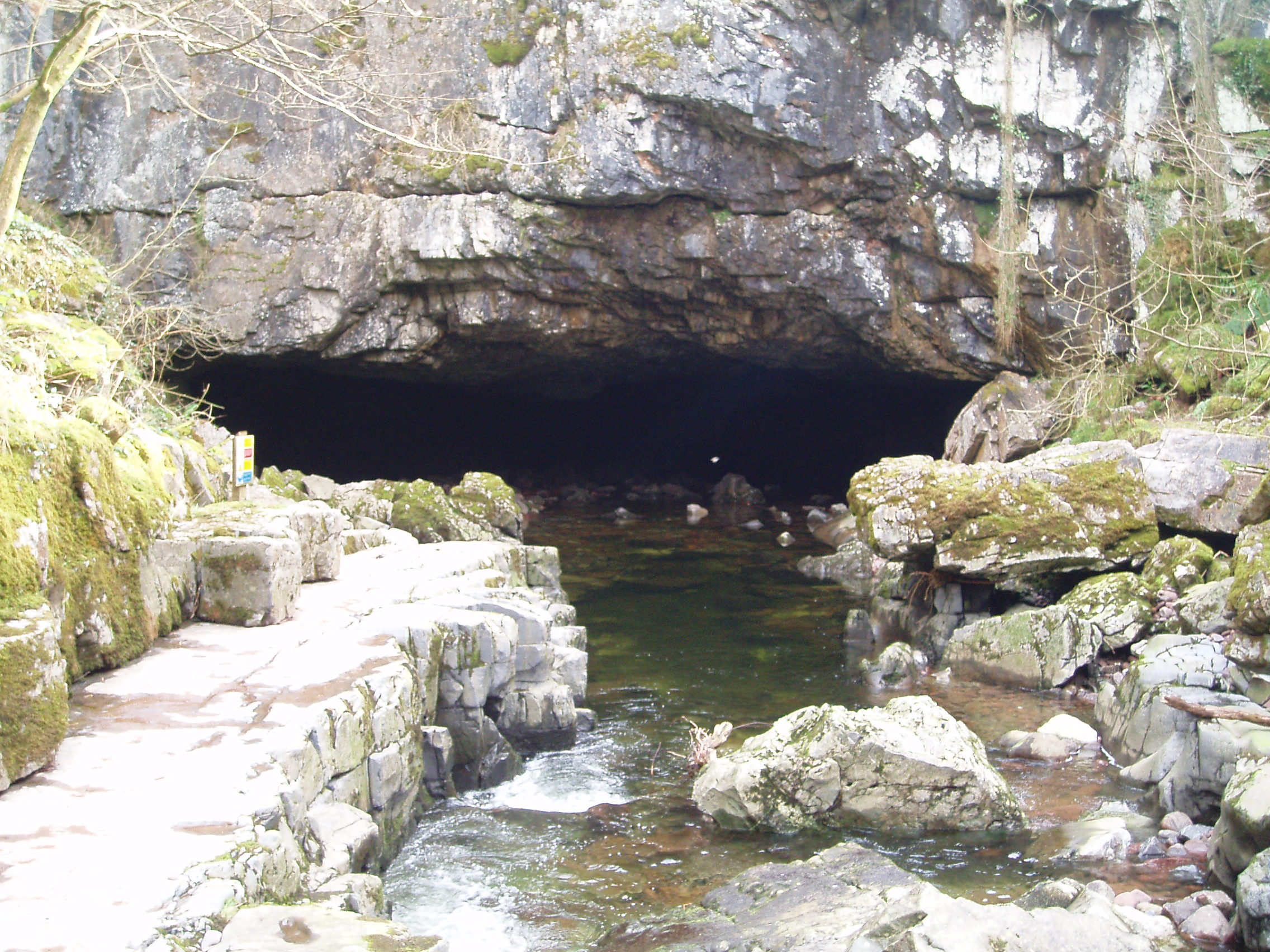
Porth yr Ogof – the scene of 11 fatalities

The following is a list of the 138 identified recorded fatalities associated with recreational caving in the UK. The main causes of death have been drowning when cave diving, drowning as the result of flooding or negotiating deep water, injuries incurred from falling from a height, and injuries incurred as the result of rock falls. In ten cases the bodies have not been recovered.

The worst incident in UK caving history was the Mossdale Caverns incident in 1967 when six cavers drowned following an unexpected cloudburst. There have been three incidents when three people have died. The first was when three cavers drowned in Langstroth Pot in 1976 when free-diving short sections of underwater passage as the result of the air in an air bell becoming foul. Three cavers were killed by a rock fall in Ease Gill Caverns in 1988, and three cavers drowned in the Marble Arch system in 1995.

Porth yr Ogof, in South Wales, accounts for eleven fatalities, nine of which were the result of people drowning when negotiating the exit pool. Ease Gill Caverns and its associated entrances account for ten deaths; Alum Pot and its associated entrances account for eight; and Mossdale Caverns accounts for six, all from the 1967 incident.

The only case of a caver dying in the UK as the result of becoming stuck was Neil Moss in Peak Cavern in 1959. The cause of death was foul air building up around him.

Date	Cave	Area	Cause	Name	Notes
Sept 1909	Square Shaft, Alderley Edge	Peak District	Fall	Alexander Rea	17-year-old boy on school outing
May 1929	West Mine, Alderley Edge	Peak District	Hypothermia	George Etchells, Alfred Hadfield	Bodies found 7 September 1929
July 1936	Alum Pot	Yorkshire Dales	Rock fall	Mabel Binks	Possibly hit by a rock deliberately thrown down the shaft
May 1939	Rowten Pot	Yorkshire Dales	Drowned	John Lambert	Fell and subsequently drowned
March 1946	West Mine, Alderley Edge	Peak District	Fall	Arthur Murray	
Dec 1946	Grange Rigg Pot	Yorkshire Dales	Hypothermia	Harold Sargeant	Died following a fall
May 1948	West Mine, Alderley Edge	Peak District	Fall	Leslie Hunt	13-year-old schoolboy
Apr 1949	Wookey Hole	Mendip	Diving	Gordon Marriott	
May 1951	Penyghent Pot	Yorkshire Dales	Hypothermia	John Williams	
Oct 1954	West Mine, Alderley Edge	Peak District	Fall	Kenneth John Booth	16-year-old schoolboy
May 1955	Alum Pot	Yorkshire Dales	Fall	John Edgar Fisher	Fell from near top of Dolly Tubs pitch when unlifelined
Jun 1957	Porth yr Ogof	South Wales	Drowned	Leonard Garraway	
Jan 1958	Goyden Pot	Yorkshire Dales	Drowned	Brian Kerr	Body not recovered
Jan 1959	Swildon's Hole	Mendip	Hypothermia	John Wallington	
Mar 1959	Peak Cavern	Peak District	Asphyxia	Neil Moss	Result of being trapped in confined space. Body interred in situ
July 1959	Dow Cave	Yorkshire Dales	Rock fall	David Priestman	
Dec 1959	Bar Pot	Yorkshire Dales	Fall	Eric Sugden	
Dec 1960	Eastwater Cavern	Mendip	Rock fall	Alan Hartnell	
Jun 1961	Coed-y-Mwstwr Woods Cave	South Wales	Rock fall	Tony Lewis	
Sep 1961	Ball Eye Mine	Peak District	Fall	George Keeling	
Jan 1962	Hell Hole	Yorkshire Dales	Drowned	Alec Ebon Beevers	
Oct 1962	Alum Pot	Yorkshire Dales	Fall	John Hopley	
Mar 1963	Deep Ecton Mine	Peak District	Diving	Garry McElliott	Diving with British Sub-Aqua Club – not a cave diver
Mar 1963	Longwood Swallet	Mendip	Hypothermia	Heather Muirhead	
May 1963	Mandale Mine	Peak District	Drowned	Roger Low	Drowned after falling down flooded surface shaft
Nov 1963	Marble Steps Pot	Yorkshire Dales	Drowned	Mike McShea	
Mar 1964	Lancaster Hole	Yorkshire Dales	Diving	Alan Clegg	
Jun 1966	Porth yr Ogof	South Wales	Drowned	Richard Speakman	
Jan 1967	Alum Pot	Yorkshire Dales	Fall	James Drummond	Schoolboy under supervision
Feb 1967	Carlswark Cavern	Peak District	Drowned	Robert MacDonald	14-year-old schoolboy under supervision
Mar 1967	Easter Iron Mine	Forest of Dean	Fall	Rex Keene	Hemp rope broke when abseiling 90 metre shaft
Jun 1967	Mossdale Caverns	Yorkshire Dales	Drowned	Dave Adamson, Geoffrey Boireau, William Frakes, John Ogden, Michael Ryan, Colin Vickers	The bodies were later interred in the far reaches of cave
Oct 1967	Sunset Hole	Yorkshire Dales	Fall	Eric Luckhurst	Rescue formed basis of Sid Perou's film Sunday at Sunset Pot
Aug 1968	Porth yr Ogof	South Wales	Drowned	Anthony Stannard	
Mar 1969	Meregill Hole	Yorkshire Dales	Hypothermia	Christopher Hay	
Aug 1969	Ease Gill Caverns	Yorkshire Dales	Rock fall	Duncan Glasfurd	
Sep 1970	Pollanaffrin	Northern Ireland	Natural causes	Mick Mulligan	
Oct 1970	Keld Head	Yorkshire Dales	Diving	Alan Erith	Remains retrieved 5 years later
Oct 1970	Porth yr Ogof	South Wales	Drowned	Stephen Sedgewick	
Feb 1971	Porth yr Ogof	South Wales	Drowned	Paul Esser	Remains retrieved in 2010
May 1971	Weathercote Cave	Yorkshire Dales	Rock fall	John Fellows	
Sep 1971	Swinsto Cave	Yorkshire Dales	Fall	Michael Midgley	
Aug 1972	Firehose Cave	Scotland	Drowned	Peter Clements	
Mar 1973	Knotlow Mine	Peak District	Drowned	Alan Evans	
May 1973	Wood Mine, Alderley Edge	Peak District	Drowned	Paul Shaw	14-year-old boy on an outdoor pursuits course
July 1973	Porth yr Ogof	South Wales	Drowned	Graham Alston	Trainee soldier on exercise
Sep 1973	Eldon Hole	Peak District	Fall	Paul Wynne	aka Suola Sulonen
Apr 1974	Holme Hill Cave	Yorkshire Dales	Fall	Peter Trousdale	
Jun 1974	Ogof Agen Allwedd	South Wales	Diving	Roger Solari	Body not recovered
July 1974	Merlin's Cave	Peak District	Diving	John Smith	
Dec 1974	Gaping Gill	Yorkshire Dales	Fall	David Huxtable	Considered to be the UK's first SRT fatality
Sep 1975	Ireby Fell Cavern	Yorkshire Dales	Fall	Stephen Hughes	
Feb 1976	Oxlow Cavern	Peak District	Fall	Stephen Nunwick	
May 1976	Langstroth Pot	Yorkshire Dales	Drowned	Martin Blackburn, Brian Fox, Donald Southern	Encountered foul air whilst free-diving
Aug 1976	Royal Hopping Mine	Peak District	Rock fall	Leslie Wheeler	
May 1977	Blayshaw Gill Pot	Yorkshire Dales	Rock fall	John Rhodes	
Sep 1977	Ilam Rising	Peak District	Diving	Mike Nelson	
April 1978	Wheal Edward Mine	Cornwall	Fall	Stella Bourke	
Oct 1979	Cote Gill Pot	Yorkshire Dales	CO poisoning	Richard Marvel, John Staniforth	Result of using high explosives
Dec 1979	Ogof Ffynnon Ddu	South Wales	Drowned	J. Fitton, D.Gough	Washed away
Mar 1980	Bull Pot of the Witches	Yorkshire Dales	Diving	Ian Plant	
Aug 1980	GB Cave	Mendip	Natural causes	Ian Roberts-Miller	
Oct 1980	Top Sink	Yorkshire Dales	Fall	Tracy Gibson	
Nov 1980	Keld Head	Yorkshire Dales	Diving	Mark Woodhouse	
Feb 1981	Pollnacrom	Northern Ireland	Diving	David Woods	Body not recovered
July 1981	Porth yr Ogof	South Wales	Drowned	Adrian Luck	
Nov 1981	Wookey Hole	Mendip	Diving	Keith Potter	
May 1982	Gaping Gill	Yorkshire Dales	Fall	Edward Holstead	
May 1982	Diccan Pot	Yorkshire Dales	Natural causes	Anthony Mosedale	
Jun 1982	Sunset Pot	Yorkshire Dales	Drowned	Neofitos Savva	
Aug 1982	Ireby Fell Cavern	Yorkshire Dales	Fall	John Martin	
Nov 1982	Gaping Gill	Yorkshire Dales	Fall	Robert Watson	
Sep 1983	Smallcleugh Mine	Cumbria	Fall	David Colin Brooks	17-year-old boy scout fell 18 metres
Jan 1985	Hurtle Pot	Yorkshire Dales	Diving	Derek Crossland	
Feb 1985	Bagshawe Cavern	Peak District	Drowned	Mark Dowsett	15-year-old schoolboy on school trip
Nov 1985	Lancaster Hole	Yorkshire Dales	Drowned	David James	
Jan 1986	Longwood Swallet	Mendip	Rock fall	Atilla Kurucz	
Mar 1986	Rowten Pot	Yorkshire Dales	Drowned	David Anderson	Cave Rescue Organisation team member on rescue
May 1986	Dale Head Pot	Yorkshire Dales	Drowned	James Taylor	
July 1986	Porth yr Ogof	South Wales	Natural causes	Gwynfor Hughes	
Apr 1988	unnamed cave	Yorkshire Dales	Diving	Nick Whaite	
May 1988	Ease Gill Caverns	Yorkshire Dales	Rock fall	Janet Barnfield, Michael Preece, David Simpson	
Aug 1988	Uamh Claig-ionn	Scotland	Hypothermia	Charles Butterworth	
Feb 1989	Jib Tunnel	Yorkshire Dales	Hypothermia	Keith Mann	
May 1989	Ivy Green Cave	Peak District	Hypothermia	Michael Boulton	Body found a year later 100 metres (330 ft) in, with no lighting
Feb 1990	Kingsdale Master Cave	Yorkshire Dales	Drowned	Phil Tamms	
Jul 1990	Glynneath Silica Mine	South Wales	Natural causes	Neville Groom	On management training course
July 1991	Jacob's Mine	Peak District	Rock fall	Stephen Goodwin	
Nov 1991	Sell Gill Holes	Yorkshire Dales	Natural causes	Francis Hardy	
Jun 1992	Porth yr Ogof	South Wales	Drowned	Amanda Stead	
Jun 1992	Joint Hole	Yorkshire Dales	Drowned	Martin McMahon	
Oct 1992	Porth yr Ogof	South Wales	Drowned	Graham Lipp	Died after rescuing boy
Jan 1993	Kingsdale Master Cave	Yorkshire Dales	Drowned	Michael Jones	Washed into Kingsdale Master Cave sump
Feb 1994	Lost Johns' Cave	Yorkshire Dales	Rock fall	Paul Lyons	
July 1994	Dismal Hill Cave	Yorkshire Dales	Diving	Trevor Kemp	
Oct 1994	Old Ing Cave	Yorkshire Dales	Drowned	Peter Ball	
Nov 1994	Whittington Stone Mine	Cotswolds	Natural causes	Bob Fairclough	
Jan 1995	Marble Arch Caves	Northern Ireland	Drowned	Con Cormican, Brian Kennedy, Philip Marshall	
May 1995	Calf Holes	Yorkshire Dales	Natural causes	Thomas Denny	Management training exercise
Aug 1996	Quaking Pot	Yorkshire Dales	Fall	Christine Bleakley	
May 1997	Lancaster Hole	Yorkshire Dales	Fall	Michael Jeffries	
Dec 1998	Ogof Pont Y Meirw	South Wales	Diving	Peter Fowler	
Nov 2000	Lancaster Hole	Yorkshire Dales	Drowned	Howard Rothwell	
Feb 2001	Ireby Fell Cavern	Yorkshire Dales	Drowned	Julian Carrol, Ray Lea	
July 2002	Porth yr Ogof	South Wales	Drowned	Kevin Sharman	
Sep 2004	Notts Pot	Yorkshire Dales	Fall	Paula Szajnowska	
Mar 2005	Low Birkwith Cave	Yorkshire Dales	Diving	Colin Pryer	
Nov 2005	Manchester Hole	Yorkshire Dales	Hypothermia	Joseph Lister	Schoolboy under supervision
Mar 2006	Upper Flood Swallet	Mendip	Natural causes	Malcolm Cotter	
Mar 2006	Astonhill Swallet	Peak District	Rock fall	David Briggs	
Aug 2006	Meregill Skit	Yorkshire Dales	Natural causes	Mike Wooding	Died of natural causes whilst diving
Dec 2007	Giant's Hole	Peak District	Hypothermia	Paul Fowkes	
Dec 2007	Lower Long Churn	Yorkshire Dales	Drowned	Caroline Fletcher, Stuart Goodwill	
July 2008	Coal mine at Craigmillar	Scotland	Asphyxia	Peter Ireson	Abseiled into foul air in disused coal mine
Apr 2011	Pwll-y-Cwm	South Wales	Diving	Bonnie Cotier	
Aug 2014	Aber Las Mine	North Wales	Asphyxia	Will Smith	Overcome by foul air in disused slate mine
Feb 2015	Bull Pot, Kingsdale	Yorkshire Dales	Rock fall	Gordon Aitken	
Aug 2017	Ewes Top Moss Pot, Scales Moor	Yorkshire Dales	Natural causes	Michael Wood	Date uncertain - body not found for several weeks
Jun 2019	Curtain Pot, Fountains Fell	Yorkshire Dales	Fall	Harry Hesketh	
Jan 2020	Lancaster Hole	Yorkshire Dales	Diving	Simon Halliday	
Mar 2023	Ayton Monument Mine, Great Ayton	Other	Asphyxia	Adam Perkins	
Jan 2025	Diccan Pot	Yorkshire Dales	Fall	Not yet publicly confirmed	

== Breakdown of fatalities by cause and area ==
The following table summarises the major causes of fatality in UK caving by cause and by area. The commonest cause of fatality in the UK is drowning - accounting for almost half the deaths when cave diving is included, and 39% when diving is excluded. The second major cause of fatality, when cave diving is excluded, is falling from height which accounts for 22% of fatalities, followed by rock fall which accounts for 13% of fatalities. The 'Other' category includes gas poisoning and asphyxiation.

Area	Diving	Drowned	Fall	Rock fall	Hypothermia	Natural causes	Other	Total
Mendip	2	0	0	2	2	2	0	8
Northern Ireland	1	3	0	0	0	1	0	5
Peak District	3	5	7	3	4	0	1	23
South Wales	3	12	0	1	0	2	0	18
Yorkshire Dales	9	26	17	10	5	6	2	75
Other	0	1	3	0	1	1	3	9
Total	18	47	27	16	12	12	6	138

== Breakdown of fatalities by cause and decade ==
The following table summarises the major causes of fatality in UK caving by decade. The changes from decade to decade partly reflect the different numbers of active cavers, partly changing techniques, and partly improved equipment.

Decade	Diving	Drowned	Fall	Rock fall	Hypothermia	Natural causes	Other	Total
1900s	0	0	1	0	0	0	0	1
1910s	0	0	0	0	0	0	0	0
1920s	0	0	0	0	2	0	0	2
1930s	0	1	0	1	0	0	0	2
1940s	1	0	2	0	1	0	0	4
1950s	0	2	3	1	2	0	1	9
1960s	2	12	5	3	2	0	0	24
1970s	4	11	7	3	0	1	2	28
1980s	6	6	5	4	3	3	0	27
1990s	2	9	2	2	0	4	0	19
2000s	1	6	1	1	2	2	1	14
2010s	1	0	1	1	0	1	1	5
2020s	1	0	1	0	0	0	1	3
Total	18	47	27	16	12	12	6	138

== Breakdown of fatalities over time ==
The following bar chart shows the number of fatalities in each decade:

== See also ==
- Caving in the United Kingdom
