= Alum Pot =

Open shaft pothole in North Yorkshire

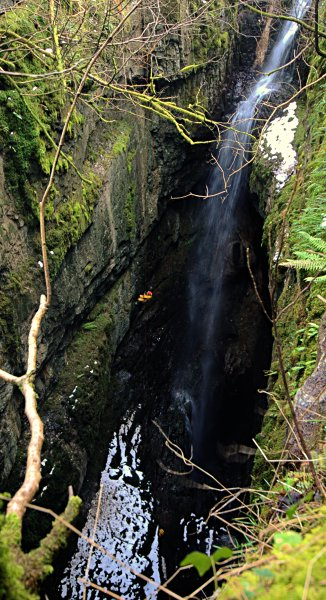
- Two cavers are exiting from the pothole, which is about 60m deep at that point.

- Location within Yorkshire Dales
- Location: Simon Fell, North Yorkshire, England
- OS grid: SD 774 755
- Coordinates: 54°10.500′N 2°20.75′W
- Depth: 104 metres (341 ft)
- Length: 159 metres (522 ft)
- Geology: Limestone
- BRAC grade: 3

Alum Pot is a pothole with a large open shaft at a surface elevation of 343 metres (1,125 ft) on the eastern flanks of Simon Fell, North Yorkshire, England. It connects with nearby Long Churn Cave and Diccan Pot. The pot is accessed via a 1-km private track on payment of a small fee from Selside Farm in the hamlet of Selside in Ribblesdale. Alum Pot has variously been known as Allan, Alan, Allen, Hellen and Hell'n.

== History ==
In 1847 John Birkbeck undertook the first partial descent of Alum Pot from Long Churn Cave which did not reach the floor of the shaft. He returned the following year and made a successful descent, when a group of nine men were lowered to the shaft floor in a large bucket winched down by a group of railway workers. Another successful complete descent of Alum Pot took place in 1870, when a group of people were lowered to the floor using a cage and windlass operated by navvies working on the Settle–Carlisle Line. In 1932 a 24-strong group of cavers from the Craven Pothole Club made the first passage from Alum Pot to Diccan Pot.

In July 1936 Mabel Binks became the first caving fatality in the Yorkshire Dales when she was hit by a rock falling down the Main Shaft. Evidence from the inquest indicated that it had been thrown down deliberately.

== See also ==
- Caving in the United Kingdom
- List of caves in the United Kingdom

== Sources ==
- Lowe, G.T. (1903) Alum Pot. Yorkshire Ramblers' Club Journal Volume 2 Number 5: pp. 35–47. Leeds: YRC
