= Longwood Swallet =

Cave in Somerset, England

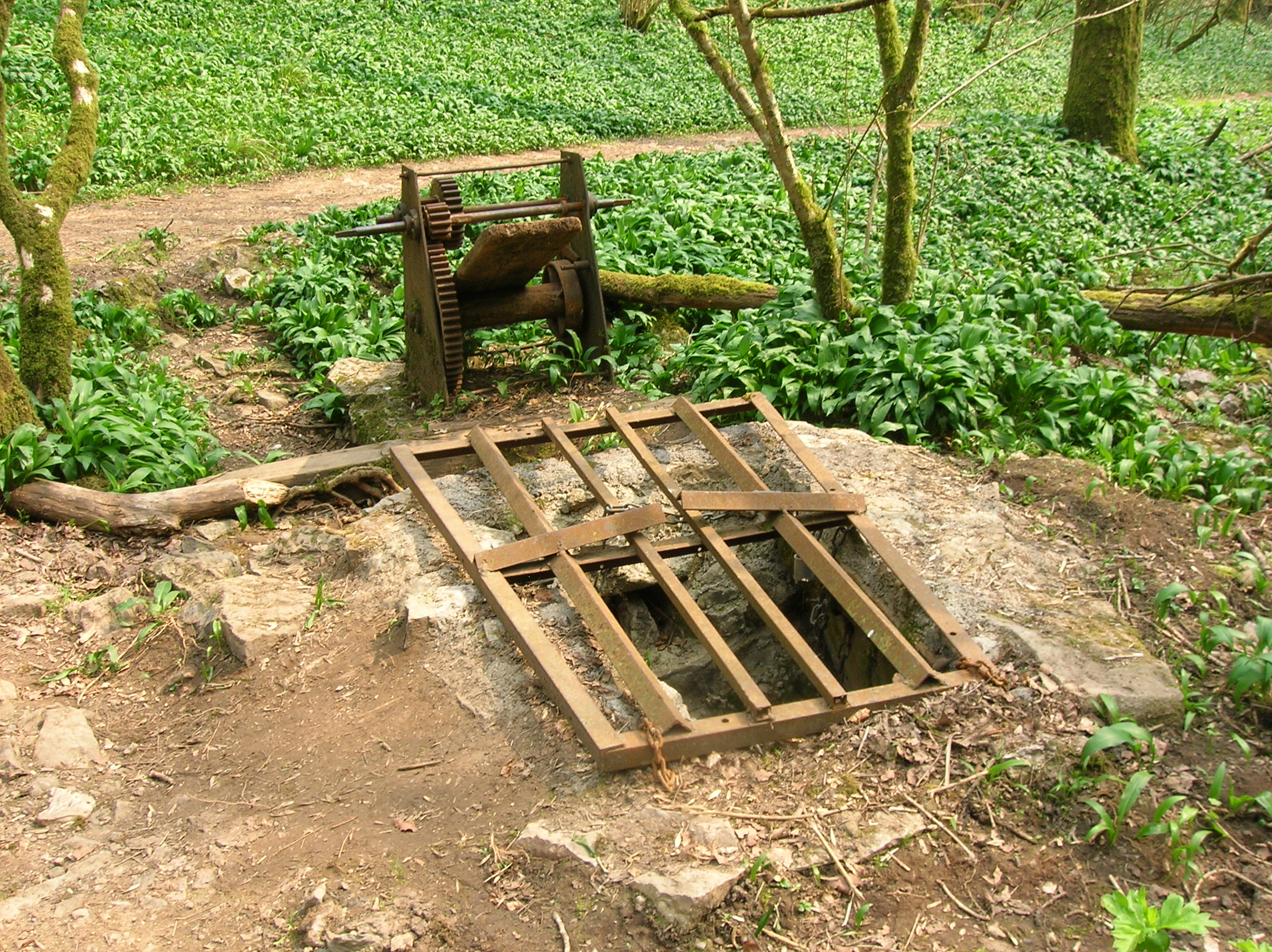

- Location within Somerset
- Location: Charterhouse, Somerset, UK
- OS grid: ST48615571
- Coordinates: 51°17′54″N 2°44′18″W
- Depth: 175 metres (574 ft)
- Length: 1.65 kilometres (1.03 mi)
- Elevation: 213 metres (699 ft)
- Discovery: 1944
- Geology: Limestone
- Entrances: 1
- Hazards: Frequent flooding
- Access: Restricted
- Cave survey: Geological Conservation Review/UBSS
- Registry: Mendip Cave Registry

The Longwood Swallet is a cave near Charterhouse, in the Carboniferous Limestone of the Mendip Hills, in Somerset, England. The cave is part of the Cheddar Complex SSSI. It is also known as the Longwood/August system.

It is 1.65 km in length and reaches a depth of 175m.

The cave was discovered in September 1944 by boys from Sidcot School.

The picture shown is not the Longwood Swallet, it is Longwood Valley Sink. Longwood Swallet's entrance is lidded concrete block construction. A (non-free) picture of Longwood Swallet entrance is available here

The cave is locked and access is controlled by the Charterhouse Caving Company. There is a warning sign posted at the entrance to the cave about flooding. This has always been a problem, but is more pronounced due to the extraction of water from the spring at Charterhouse. When the pumps owned by Bristol Water stop this can cause a flood wave to travel down the stream and into the cave.

== See also ==
- Caves of the Mendip Hills
