= Alderley Edge Mines =

Abandoned mines in Cheshire, England

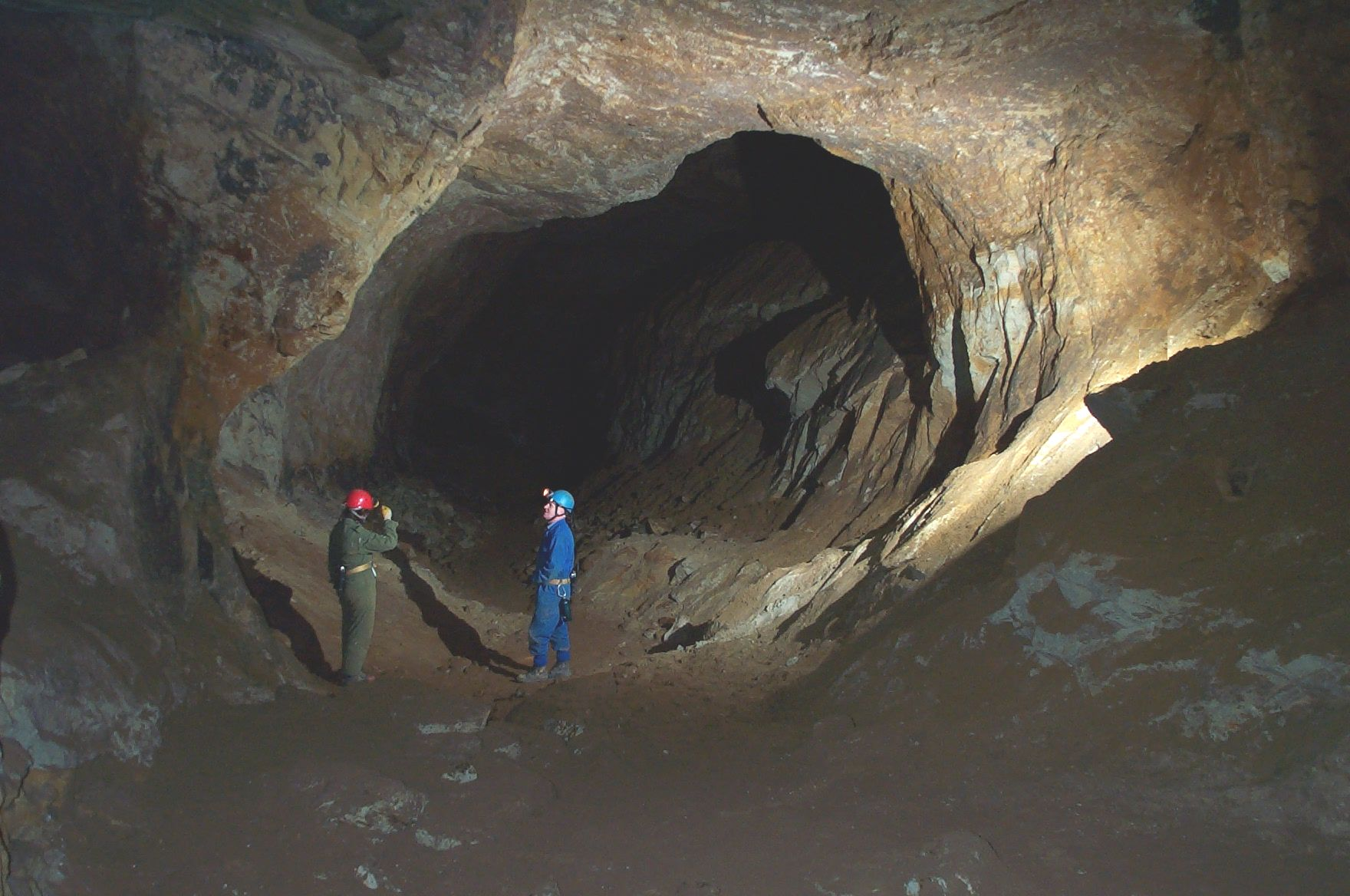
- Passage in West Mine

- Location in Cheshire
- Location: Alderley Edge, Cheshire East, United Kingdom; 53°17′46″N 2°12′43″W
- Products: Copper, Lead, Cobalt
- Opened: Early Bronze Age
- Closed: 1920s
- Company: National Trust

The Alderley Edge Mines are located on the escarpment in Alderley Edge, Cheshire. Archaeological evidence indicates that copper mining took place here during Roman times and the Bronze Age, and written records show that mining continued here from the 1690s up to the 1920s. The site was the location of the Alderley Edge Landscape Project and the Pot Shaft Hoard.

Many of the mines are owned by the National Trust. The Derbyshire Caving Club have leased the access rights, and they continue to explore and search for areas of mining that have been closed for centuries.

== Location and geology ==
The mines are located in a horst block at Alderley Edge, Cheshire. The area is primarily of Triassic New Red Sandstone of the pebble beds formation. The youngest beds (members) are known locally as the Nether Alderley and West Mine sandstones followed by the Wood Mine Conglomerates, Beacon Lodge Sandstones and Engine Vein Conglomerates. These latter members make up the Helsby Sandstone Formation of the Sherwood Sandstone Group.

== Mining history ==
=== Bronze Age ===
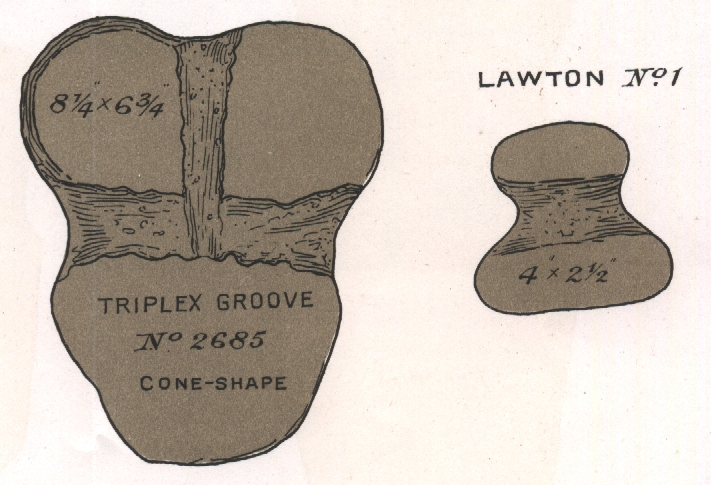
Hammerstones recorded by Charles Roeder

In the 19th century, crudely shaped stones were found in the bottom of old workings and were thought to be Bronze Age hammer stones. A wooden shovel was found and recorded in 1878. The findings from the 1878 investigation were written up by Roeder and Graves. These added to the theory of Bronze Age working that there was a possibility of Roman mining. The picture was transformed in 1993 when a wooden shovel was rediscovered by Alan Garner. The shovel was carbon-dated to around 1780 BC. Subsequently, the Alderley Edge Landscape Project was established, and excavation around Engine Vein revealed what are believed to be Bronze Age smelting hearths dating to around 2000 BC.

=== Roman mining ===
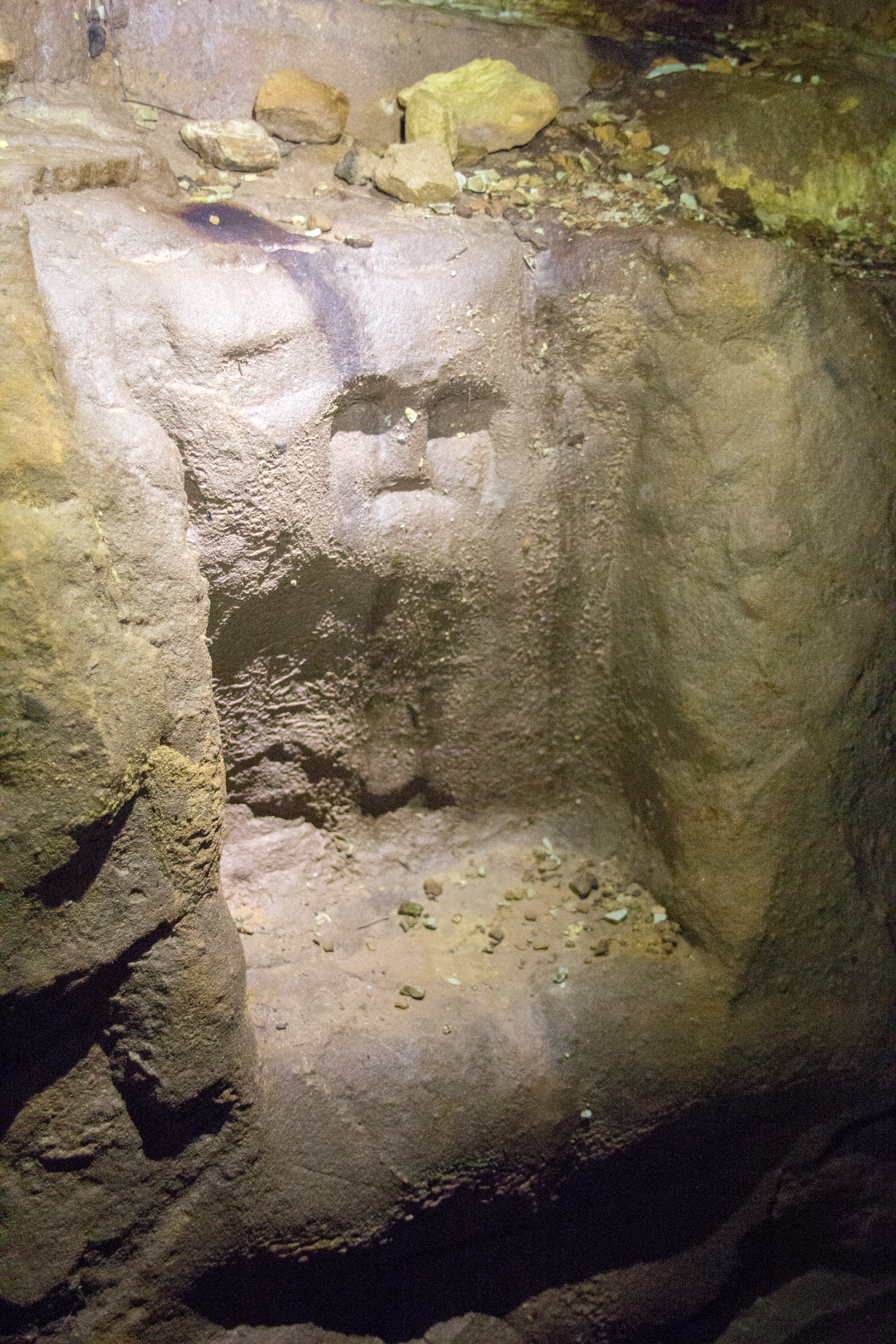
The Roman altar in Engine Vein

Roman mining was considered unlikely until the finding in 1995 of a 4th-century AD Roman coin hoard (the "Pot Shaft Hoard") in an abandoned shaft at Engine Vein mine. This dated the shaft to the 4th century and its regularity and depth suggested that the Romans may well have worked it. An archaeological excavation was undertaken by Derbyshire Caving Club members supervised by the Alderley Edge Landscape Project archaeologists and, at the bottom, timbers were revealed which were carbon-dated to the last century BC. Given that they were heartwood from cut timbers, the dating cannot be precise and the shaft is now believed to be Roman in origin. The passage from the shaft to the Vein was driven from the direction of the shaft and resembles other Roman workings such as at the gold mines at Dolaucothi in Carmarthenshire and the azurite mines at Wallerfangen in Germany.

Between the Roman working and 1690, there is scant evidence of mining except a reference to "myne holes", which cannot be relied on as evidence of mining in progress.

=== 17th and 18th centuries ===
From 1693 to the mid-19th century, various people are reported to have explored the Edge for copper and work was done at Saddlebole, Stormy Point, Engine Vein and Brinlow. It is likely that the near-surface sections of Wood Mine were investigated during this period. One operator of note was Charles Roe of Macclesfield, who worked the mines from 1758 to 1768. During this period, copper from Alderley was taken to Macclesfield where it was combined with zinc from calamine ore from Derbyshire mines to make brass. Roe moved to Anglesey upon the discovery of major deposits of copper at Parys Mountain.

=== Early 19th century ===
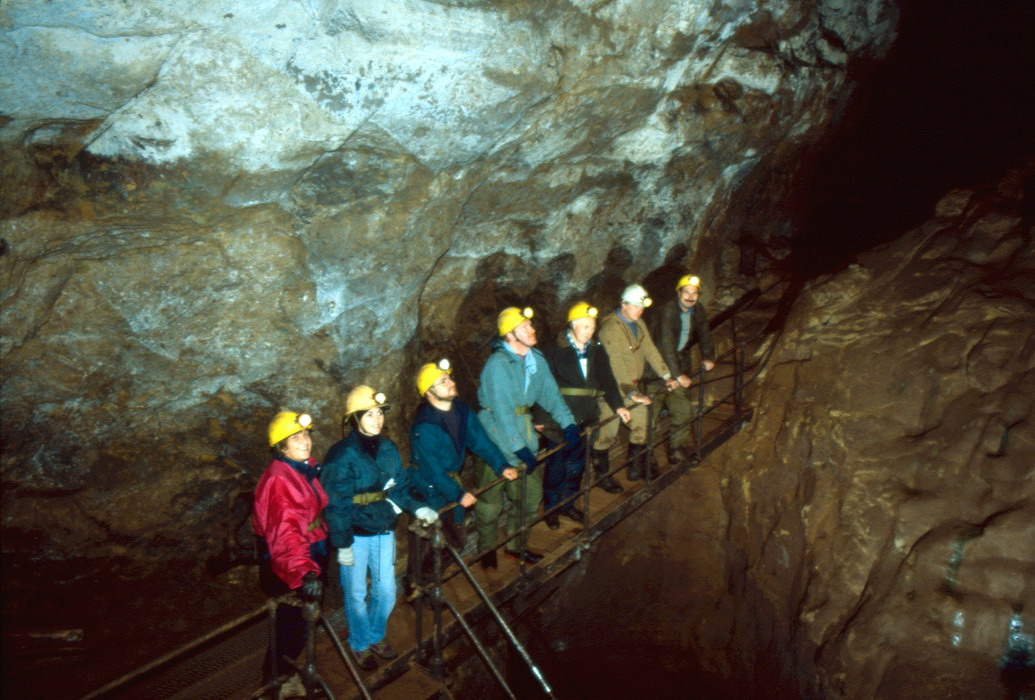
Visitors in Engine Vein

Apart from Roe, the history of working up to 1857 is patchy. The best recorded period was between about 1805 and 1812 when a company of local men including a Derbyshire miner, James Ashton, tried to exploit the mines for lead. During the course of their work, they identified the presence of cobalt which was in demand during the Napoleonic blockade of supplies. In fact, the first identification of cobalt locally may have been prior to 1806 at the nearby Mottram St. Andrew mine, which is mentioned in Henry Holland's 1808 General View of the Agriculture of Cheshire.

The cobalt mining rights on Alderley Edge were leased by Sir John Stanley to a Yorkshire company for an annual rent of £1,000 in 1807. By early 1808, Tomlinson and Company of the Ferrybridge Pottery were leasing the mines at an annual rent of £2,000 plus a £400 share for Lord Stanley. The ore extracted was taken in tubs to Ferrybridge where it was made into cobalt glass, or smalt, a blue pigment used in the pottery industry and for whitening laundry.

Evidence in the field points to the working of a series of mines on a north–south fault running from Saddlebole to Findlow Hill Wood. Some parts of Engine Vein and possibly West Mine appear to have been excavated at this time. The mining ceased at the end of 1810 when the price of cobalt fell. Around the same time, the Ferrybridge cobalt works was seized by excise officers for purported illegal glass manufacture. Although the government later cancelled the fine that had been assessed, the business was unable to recover from the stoppage.

The leases for the period tell the story for Ashton who sacrificed his salary for his share in the company, but even lost this when the company called for more capital than he could provide – and yet he was the man down the mine doing the work.

=== Late 19th century ===
In 1857, a Cornish man, James Michell, started work at West Mine and moved on in the 1860s to Wood Mine and Engine Vein. His company lasted 21 years (the length of the lease) although Michell died in an accident in the mines in 1862. During this working period, nearly 200,000 tons of ore were removed, yielding 3,500 tons of copper metal. The mines closed in 1877 and the Abandonment Plan of 1878 shows all the workings open at that date. This period saw the mining of West Mine and Wood Mine and the reworking of Engine Vein, Brynlow, Doc Mine and other smaller mines on the Edge.

=== 20th century ===
There were some limited and unsuccessful attempts to re-open the mines in 1911, 1914, during the First World War, and shortly after. However these ended in the 1920s in a sale of equipment in 1926.

== Visitors, exploration and fatalities ==
From the 1860s onwards, there have been many thousands of visitors to the mines, many – including the earliest – with good lighting and experienced leaders. However, many other visitors were ill-equipped and unprepared. This led to a series of accidents, which included six fatalities.

One of the earliest recorded deaths was that of Alexander Rea on 12 September 1909. Rea was exploring the mines with others "in a dark tunnel without matches" when he suddenly disappeared. His body was found at the bottom of a 90 ft (27 m) shaft.

George Etchells and Alfred Hadfield died exploring West Mine in May 1929, although their bodies were not found until August. Between 1940 and 1960, there was an increase in ill-prepared visitors entering the mines, resulting in deaths in 1946, 1948 and 1954, all in West Mine. Partly as a result, the West and Wood Mines were blocked in the early 1960s.

In 1969 the Derbyshire Caving Club obtained permission from the National Trust (the owners) to re-open Wood Mine. Since then, much has been found by excavation and exploration, and thousands of people have visited the mines in supervised groups. Since 1969, more mines have been re-opened than were known to exist at the time and all the mines have been mapped by the Derbyshire Caving Club. From 1995 to 2005, a major investigation was undertaken by the Manchester Museum in conjunction with the National Trust, the Caving Club and many others resulting in two significant publications covering the archaeology and wider history of Alderley Edge as well as a major rewrite of the 1979 book by Chris Carlon.

== Mines ==
A number of different mines are located at Alderley Edge. The Mottram St Andrew mine also has connections with the Alderley Edge mines.

=== Brynlow Mine ===
Brynlow Mine is around 300 metres (980 ft) long and 25 metres (82 ft) deep, at an elevation of 155 metres (509 ft). It is one of the earlier mines, with hand-picked tunnels, that connects to the Hough Level.

=== Cobalt Mine ===
The Cobalt Mine is around 1,000 metres (3,300 ft) long, 16 metres (52 ft) deep, and is at an elevation of 190 metres (620 ft). These mines start at the Engine Vein and run to the current location of the car park. There are five open shafts connected to the mine and at least three more suspected shafts. The mine was worked in the early 19th century but does not appear on the abandonment plan of 1876, probably because it contains no copper deposits and was therefore of no interest to the late 19th-century miners.

=== Engine Vein ===
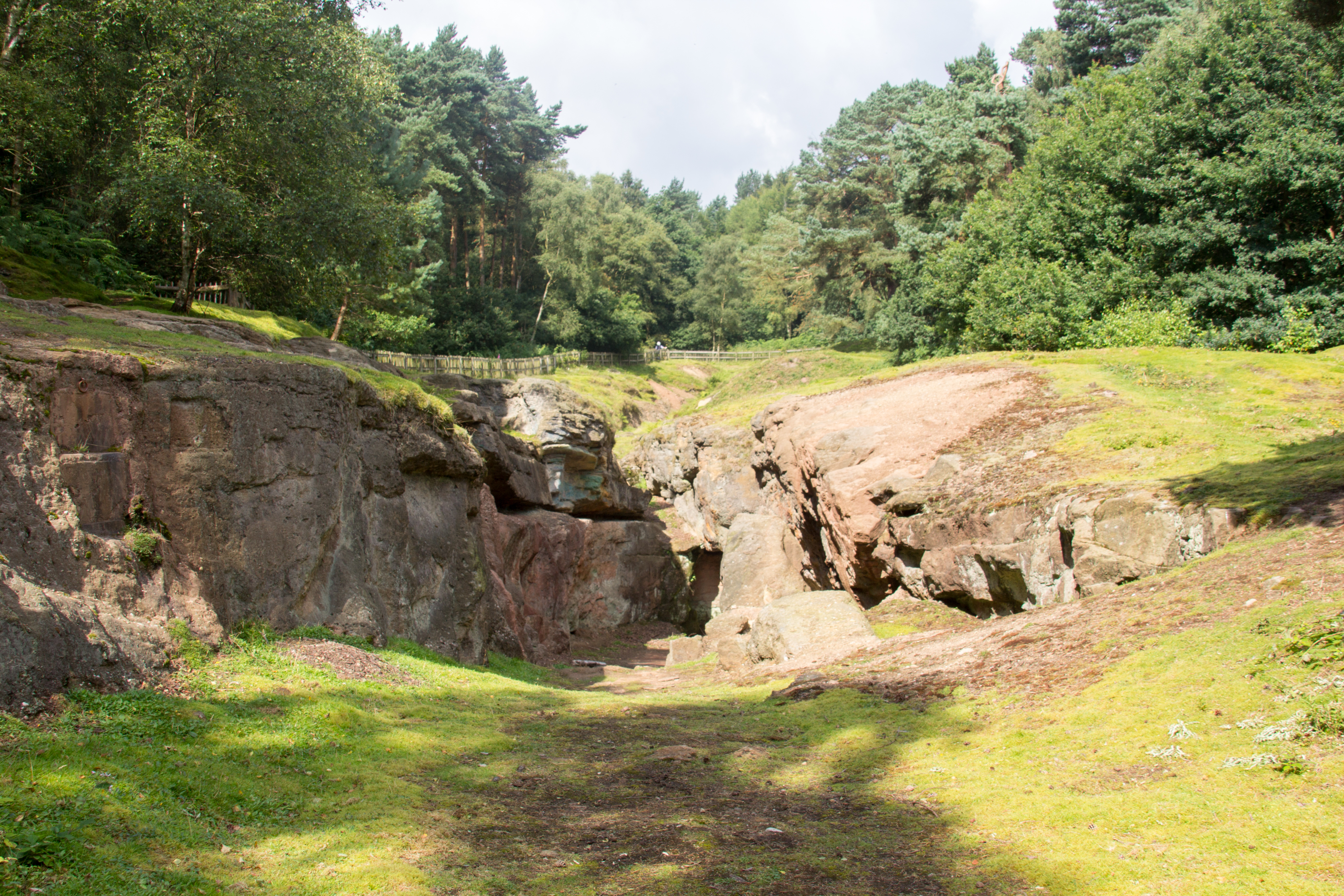
Above ground at the Engine Vein

Engine Vein is a vertical vein mine, 750 metres (2,460 ft) long and 60 metres (200 ft) deep, with its entrance at an elevation of 195 metres (640 ft). The lower parts of the mine connect to the Hough Level. The surface features at Engine Vein include evidence of Early Bronze Age mining. Within the mine, a shaft of Roman age has been dated from timbers in the shaft and a coin hoard found near the surface. Coffin levels (narrow tunnels, coffin shaped in section) strongly suggest working in the 18th century; the western extremity was probably worked by Ashton in the early 19th century and a substantial volume of ore was also removed in the middle or late 19th century. There is even evidence of working in the early 20th century so the mine was probably worked over four millennia.

=== Hough Level ===
The Hough Level is a connecting tunnel that links the works outside the West Mine with Wood Mine, Brynlow Mine and Engine Vein. At the extreme east end of the level, it emerges at the surface near Dickens Wood. It is 1,500 metres (4,900 ft) long and is at an elevation of 135 metres (443 ft).

=== New Venture ===
The New Venture mine is located close to West Mine, and is at an elevation of around 145 metres (476 ft). The mine is currently inaccessible.

=== Pillar and Doc Mines ===
The Pillar and Doc mines are small, shallow mines near Stormy Point. Between them lie Bronze Age mines. They are around 50 metres (160 ft) long, 10 metres (33 ft) deep at present, and are at an elevation of 165 metres (541 ft). The so-called Doc Mine extends across Stormy Point to forefield but may connect with a shaft at its western end. The full extension is currently inaccessible due to a shaft collapse many years ago.

=== Twin Shafts ===
Opencast mines on Stormy Point, the Twin Shafts are around 10 metres (33 ft) deep, and are at an elevation of 170 metres (560 ft).

=== West Mine ===
West Mine is on multiple levels, and is mostly made up of 19th-century tunnels. One tunnel, which can be traced from near the entrance for about 200 metres (660 ft), shows signs that it was excavated in the early 19th century. The majority of the mine tunnels date from the middle or late 19th century. About halfway through the mine it is cut by a major fault that required the miners to drive exploratory levels in order to relocate the mineralised area. This was successful in about 1862 and the mine appears to have continued working until around 1877. It is about 10,000 metres (33,000 ft) long, and 50 metres (160 ft) deep, at an elevation of 145 metres (476 ft). It was open for day trips in the 1920s until two young adults lost their way in the mine in 1929 and their bodies were discovered by chance several months later. The mine remained open and was regularly visited until the entrance was thoroughly blocked in the 1960s. The mine was reopened by the Derbyshire Caving Club in 1975.

=== Wood Mine ===
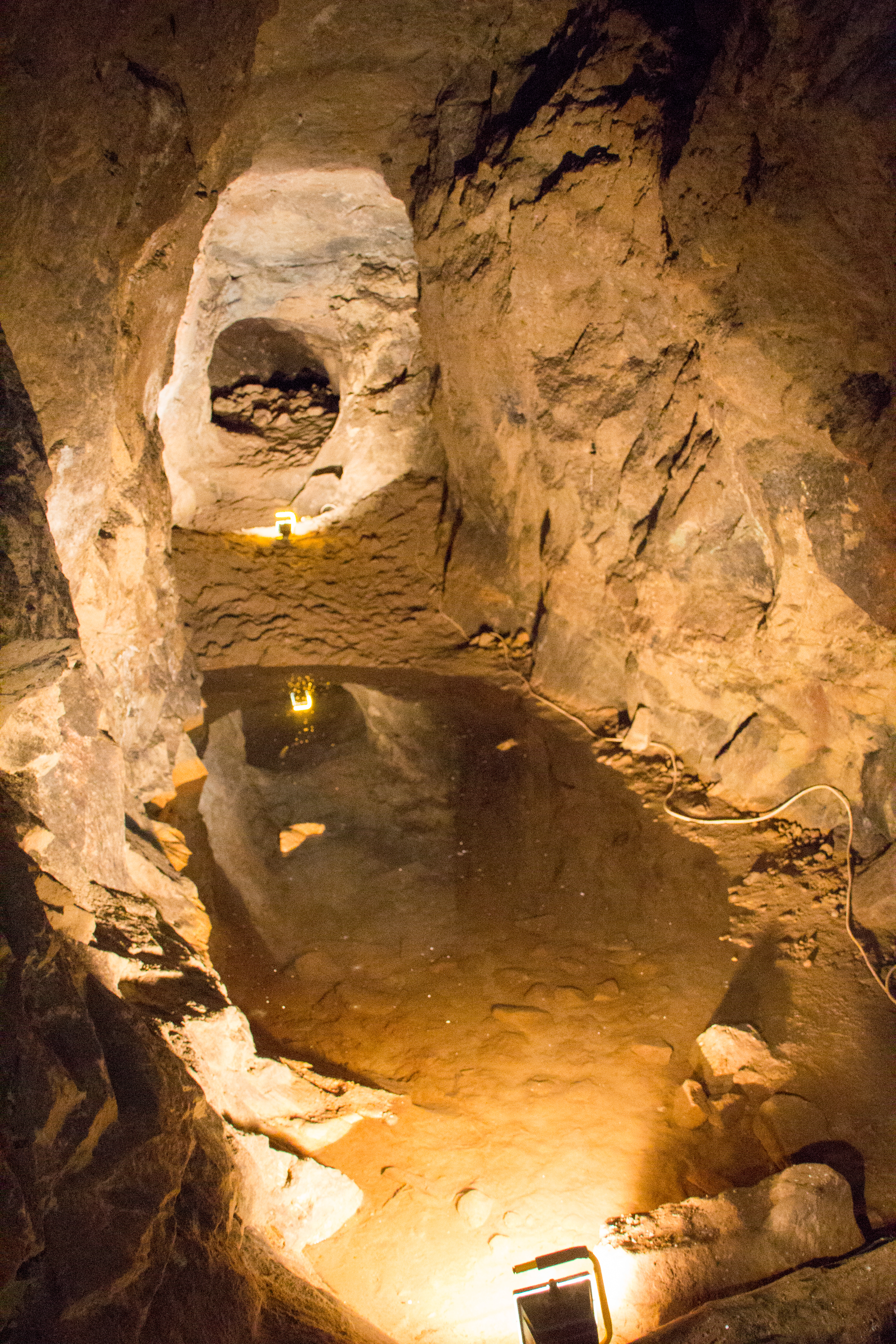
An underground pool in Wood Mine

Wood Mine mostly consists of 19th-century tunnels. It is around 2,400 metres (7,900 ft) long, and 30 metres (98 ft) deep, at an elevation of 160 metres (520 ft).

== Sources ==
- Anonymous (1808). "Indenture between (1) Ashton, (2) Bury and Dodge and (3) Jarrold".
- Anonymous (29 November 1862). "Fatal Accident at Alderley". Fatal Accident at Alderley.
- Anonymous (14 September 1909). "Tourist Killed in a Mine". The Standard. London. p. 8 col. 2.
- Anonymous (17 February 1911). "Alderley Edge Copper Mines – Work Commenced". Alderley and Wilmslow Advertiser.
- Anonymous (19 January 1914). "Latest News Items". The Standard. London. p. 10 col. 6. "Arrangements for reopening extensive copper mines on Lord Sheffield's estates at Alderley Edge, in North-east Cheshire, are being completed by a local syndicate. These mines have been derelict for over 20 years."
- Bakewell, Robert (1811). "Account of a Cobalt Mine in Cheshire". Monthly Magazine. 31 (209): 7–9.
- Bakewell, Robert (1813), "Appendix VI: Cobalt Mine at Alderley Edge in Cheshire", An Introduction to geology, illustrative of the general structure of the Earth, London: J. Harding, pp. 342–348
- Bennett, J.H.E.; Dewhurst, J.C. (1940). Quarter Sessions Records ... for the County Palatine of Chester 1559–1760. The Record Society of Lancashire and Cheshire. pp. 195–197.
- Bentley Smith, D. (2005). A Georgian Gent & Co. – The Life and Times of Charles Roe. Ashbourne: Landmark Publishing. ISBN 1-84306-175-9.
- Boyd-Dawkins, W. (1876). On the Stone Mining Tools from Alderley Edge. Vol. V. Journal of the Anthropological Institute of Great Britain and Ireland. pp. 2–5.
- Carlon, Chris J (1979). The Alderley Edge Mines. Manchester: Sherratt & Son.
- Carlon, Chris J; Dibben, Nigel J (2012). The Alderley Edge Mines. Nantwich: Nigel Dibben. ISBN 978-1-78280-015-6.
- Garner, Alan; Prag, A.J.N.W.; Housley, R. (1993). The Alderley Edge Shovel, An Epic in Three Acts. Vol. 137. Current Archaeology. pp. 172–175.
- Higgs, Samuel (15 October 1858). "On the Alderley Edge Copper Mines". Royal Cornwall Gazette: 7.
- Jones, William Francis (1961). The Copper Mines of Alderley Edge. Manchester: Privately published.
- Korlin, Gabrielle (2013). "Roman azurite mining in Wallerfangen". Deutsches Bergbau-Museum Bochum (DBM). Archived from the original on 2 September 2017.
- "List of Alderley Mines". Derbyshire Caving Club.
- Nevell, Michael (December 1996). The 'Pot Shaft' Hoard, Alderley Edge, Cheshire. Coins in Context: the controlled micro-excavation of a fourth-century Roman coin hoard. Final Report. University of Manchester Archaeological Unit.
- Osborne, Stephen (24 October 1864). "Report". The Mining Journal.
- Prag, A.J.N.W., ed. (2016). The Story of Alderley: Living with the Edge. Manchester: Manchester University Press. p. 360. ISBN 9780719091711.
- Roeder, Charles (1901). Prehistoric and subsequent mining at Alderley Edge, with a sketch of the archaeological features of the neighbourhood. Vol. 19. Transactions of the Lancashire and Cheshire Antiquarian Society. pp. 77–118.
- Roeder, Charles; Graves, F.S. (1905). Recent archaeological discoveries at Alderley Edge. Vol. 23. Transactions of the Lancashire and Cheshire Antiquarian Society. pp. 17–2.
- Sainter, J.D. (1878). The jottings of ... some rambles round Macclesfield. Macclesfield: Swinnerton and Brown.
- Sinclair Ross, James (7 June 1920). "Improvements in the obtainment of sulphate of copper, from ores containing copper. Patent 1920 No 143,973": 1–3.
- "Solid Geology", New Historical Atlas of Cheshire, Cheshire Community Council and Keele University, 2001, ISBN 0-904532-46-1, archived from the original on 26 September 2007
- Stanley, Louisa Dorothea (1843). Alderley Edge and its Neighbourhood. Didsbury: J. Swinnerton, Macclesfield. Reprinted 1972, E. J. Morten.
- Timberlake, Simon; Prag, A.J.N.W. (2005). The Archaeology of Alderley Edge. British Archaeological Reports. Oxford: John and Erica Hedges Ltd. doi:10.30861/9781841717159. ISBN 1-84058-007-0.
- Timberlake, Simon (2016). "Early Mining: The evidence before 1598". In Prag, A.J.N.W. (ed.). The Story of Alderley: Living with the Edge. Manchester: Manchester University Press. pp. 342–367. ISBN 9780719091711.
- Warrington, Geoffrey (1981). "The Copper Mines of Alderley Edge and Mottram St Andrew, Cheshire". Journal of the Chester Archaeological Society (64): 47–73. doi:10.5284/1070264.
- Warrington, Geoffrey (2016). "Mining in the Alderley district: The documented period". In Prag, A.J.N.W. (ed.). The Story of Alderley: Living with the Edge. Manchester: Manchester University Press. pp. 368–413. ISBN 9780719091711.
- Whitehouse, Bill (1 November 2013). "The history of cave rescue before the 1959 'Neil Moss Tragedy'" (PDF). Mountain Rescue England and Wales.
