= Porth yr Ogof =

Cave near Ystradfellte, Powys, Wales

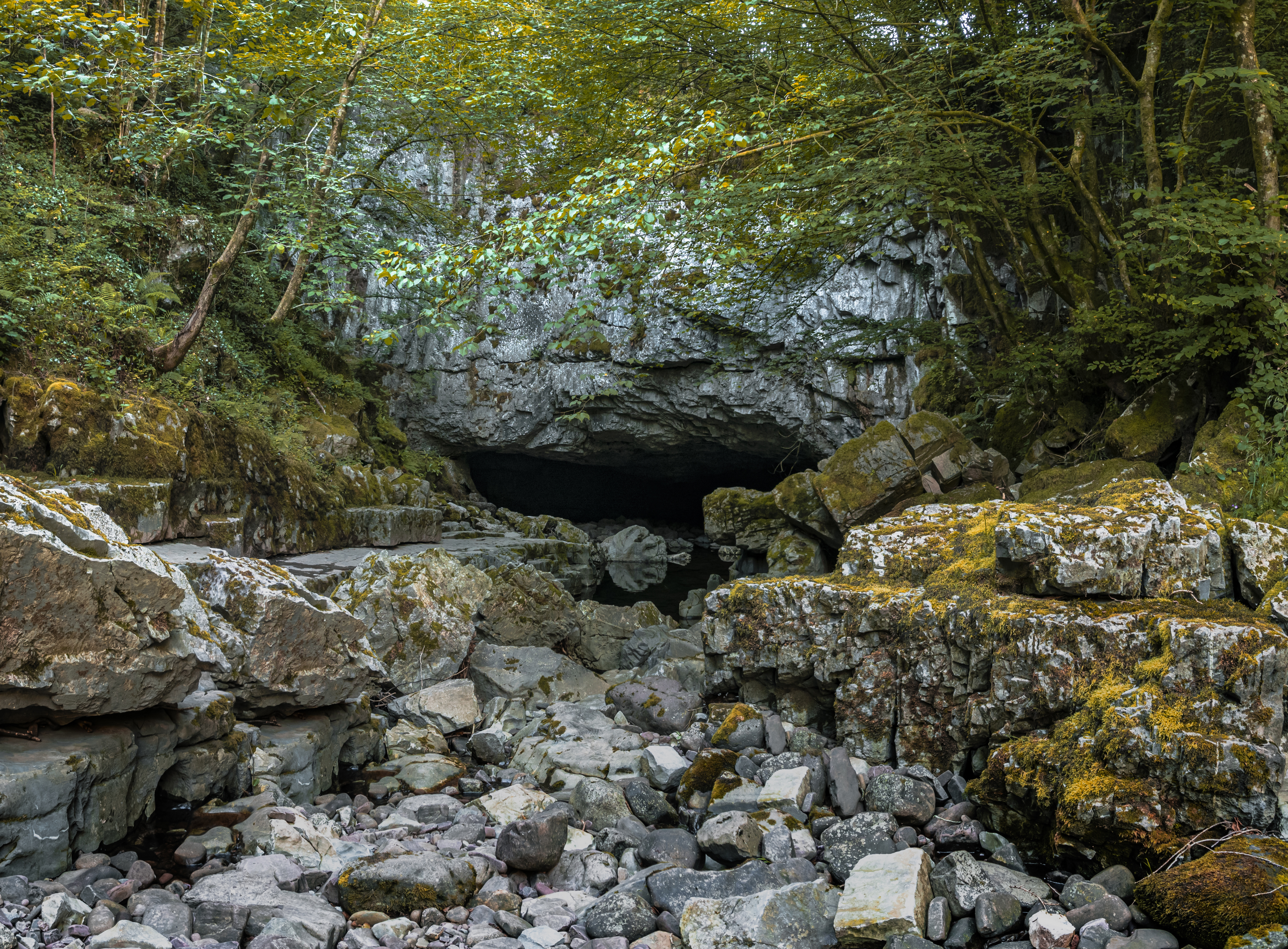
- The main entrance
- Interactive map of Porth yr Ogof
- Location: near Ystradfellte
- Coordinates: 51.8006°N 3.5562°W
- Length: 2.25 km (1.4 mi)
- Geology: limestone
- Entrances: 15
- Translation: Gateway of the cave (Welsh)

Porth yr Ogof is a solutional cave near the village of Ystradfellte, near the southern boundary of the Brecon Beacons National Park in Wales. It lies on the course of the Afon Mellte, a river whose name translates as 'lightning', commonly explained as a reference to the "flashy" nature of the river, i.e. its rising and falling rapidly in response to rainfall. In 1998 the cave's passageways had been measured as over 2.25 kilometres (1.40 mi) in length. Among the cave's fifteen entrances is the largest cave entrance in Wales and one of the largest in the UK, nearly 20 metres (66 ft) wide and 8 metres (26 ft) high. The cave was used as a show cave many years ago, but is not as attractive as more decorated caves such as Dan yr Ogof, and so today is more often used to introduce people to cave exploration.

== Cave features ==
Porth yr Ogof is most often entered through the wide main entrance, either using a dry ledge on the left or by wading through the knee-deep river to the centre and right. The second most used entrance is called the Workman's or Tradesman's Entrance. A passage in the left of this entrance leads to a mud cavern. Challenging elements of the cave interior include the "Wormhole" (a curving crawl tube on the right wall of the main entrance), the "Letterbox" (a rectangular space in the passage) and the "Creek", further inside the cave. There are also two features named the "Washing Machine", both of which feature large expanses of water.

Porth yr Ogof is now uncommercialised, and is used as a training cave for caving. There are two short pothole entrances accessible to cavers. The cave is generally wet. White Horse Pool, named after the shape of the calcite deposit on the back wall, is several metres in depth despite the shallowness of the edges, and there are many sumps (completely flooded passageways), the majority of which exist in the portions of the cave north of the Tradesman's Entrance.

== Deaths ==
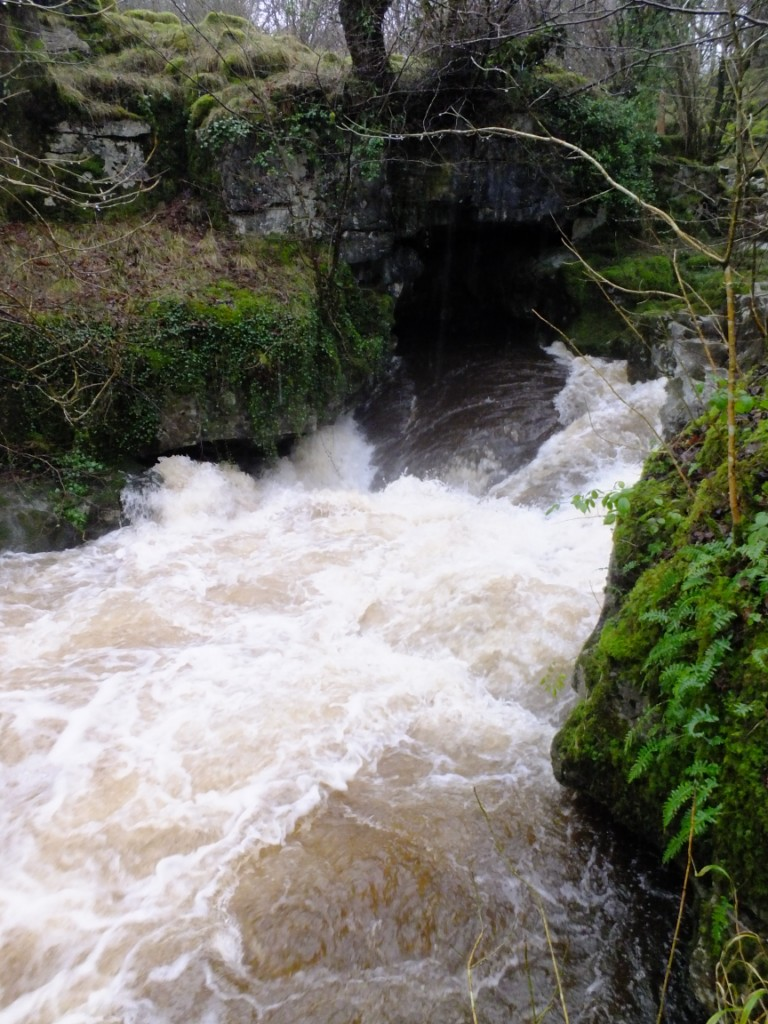
Porth yr Ogof resurgence in flood conditions

There have been eleven deaths at Porth yr Ogof since 1957, ten of which occurred in the cold, fast-flowing and 7-metre (23 ft) deep Resurgence Pool at the far end of the cave where the Afon Mellte resurges.

== Geological and human history ==
'Porth yr Ogof' is Welsh, translated as 'gateway to the cave'. The cave lies in the valley of the Afon Mellte and is located in a comparatively narrow band of Carboniferous Limestone. Except after periods of heavy rain, the river bed is largely dry downstream of Ystradfellte, the river only rising to the surface again just before the cave.

The cave and its many visible fossils were mentioned in the writings of Edward Lhuyd, and in the 19th century it was mentioned again by the first pioneers of caving, notably T.A.J. Braithwaite as noted in a publication named Caves & Caving circa 1936.
