= Long Churn Cave =

Cave in North Yorkshire, England

Long Churn
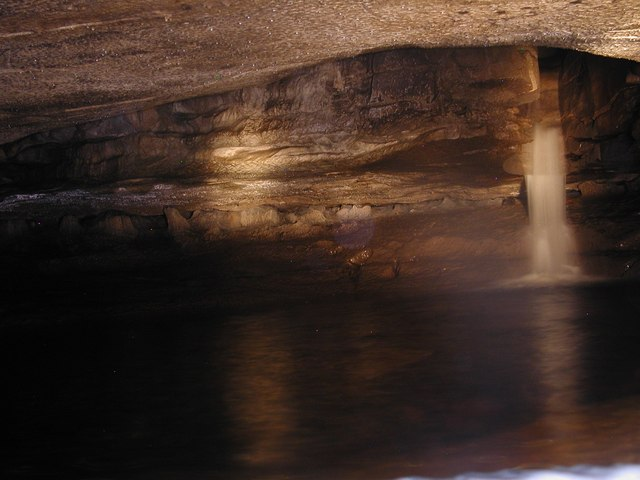
- Dr. Bannisters Hand Basin
- Interactive map of Long Churn
- Location: Ingleton
- Coordinates: 54°10′32″N 2°20′57″W
- Discovery: 1870

Long Churn Cave is a cave in the Ingleborough area of the Yorkshire Dales. First explored before 1779, it has become a popular location for beginner cavers and it contains the most famous squeeze in the Dales, the "Cheesepress". It is near Selside, about 9 miles (14 km) north of Ingleton, North Yorkshire. Access is by permission from the landowner at Selside Farm after payment of a nominal fee.

== Geology ==
Created in limestone by the slow corrosion of slightly acidic rainwater over millions of years, the cave is split into two parts, "Lower Long Churn" and "Upper Long Churn", each active with a stream, and is connected to the nearby Alum Pot and Diccan Pot. Upper Long Churn can be entered via descent of a 4-metre (13 ft) waterfall into "Dr Bannister's Handbasin", a moderately deep pool of water, and comprises a single long passage. Lower Long Churn leads to an exit into Diccan Pot, followed by the "Cheesepress", a narrow squeeze which is notorious for its tightness but which can be bypassed. The following part of the passage used to be aided by artificial aids (over the so-called "Plank Pool") but is no longer. The end of the Lower Long Churn is a chamber which opens on a window into Alum Pot, which is much more technically difficult to descend (or ascend).

== Exploration ==
The cave was first explored prior to 1779, with a traverse of the passage by John Hutton in June 1779 recorded in his publication "A Tour to the Caves in the environs of Ingleborough and Settle, etc." A named feature of the cave, Dr Bannister's Handbasin, was already well known then. It was visited by W. Boyd-Dawkins in 1870,,. Outdoor author Alfred Wainwright wrote of the system:

It is quite possible and in fact easy to die a horrible death by straying off route. The dangers of Alum Pot are manifestly obvious. Other deathtraps, unseen, occur in the black interiors of some of the caves.

The cave is commonly used as an introduction to caving for novice and inexperienced cavers, although in wet weather water levels can rise to a dangerous extent. In 2007, a man and woman both drowned in the same incident, and in 2008 two separate groups were trapped in the cave during storms, although there were no deaths.
