= Upper Flood Swallet =

Limestone cave in Somerset, England

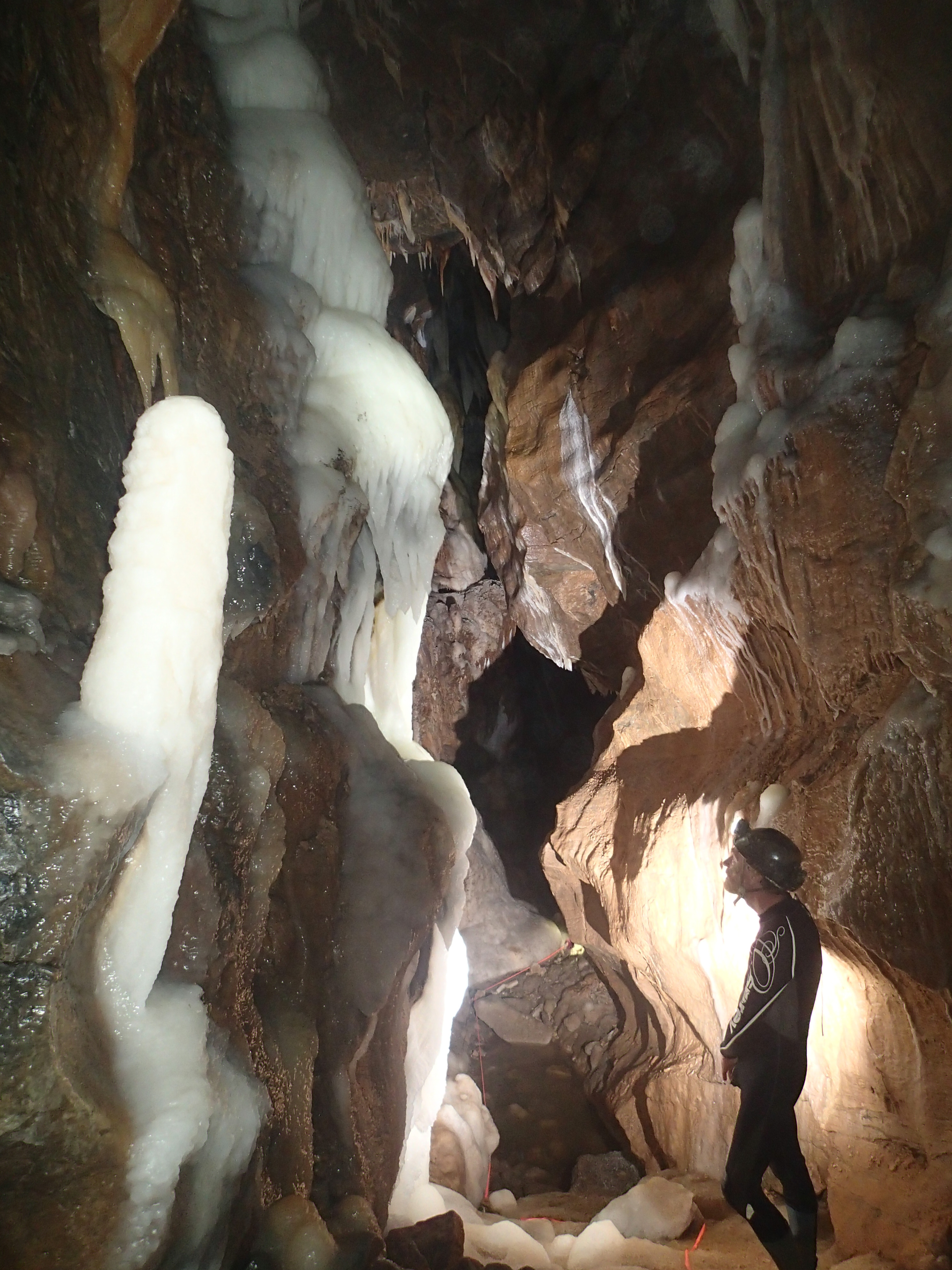

- Location within Somerset
- Location: Charterhouse, Somerset, UK
- OS grid: ST 50570 55765
- Coordinates: 51°17′56″N 2°42′37″W
- Depth: 110m
- Length: 4.1km
- Discovery: 3 October 1968
- Geology: Limestone
- Entrances: 1
- Difficulty: Extensive system with tight strenuous sections
- Access: Leader controlled by Mendip Caving Group; experienced cavers only
- Cave survey: MCG Upper Flood Survey 2012
- Registry: Mendip Cave Registry

Upper Flood Swallet which was originally known as Blackmoor Flood Swallet, is an exceptionally well-decorated cave near Charterhouse, in the carboniferous limestone of the Mendip Hills, in Somerset, England. The cave is part of the Cheddar Complex SSSI.

The entrance was revealed in the Great Flood of 1968, giving the cave its name. It was dug consistently since then with breakthroughs occurring in 1971, 1972, 1985 and 2006.

As of September 2008 it is over 3.5 km in length and around 125 m deep.

== The 2006 breakthrough ==
In September 2006 cavers squeezed through an excavated boulder choke into new passage. In a series of three digging trips they discovered 1.2 km of well decorated cave.

== See also ==
- Caves of the Mendip Hills
