= Survex =

- Developer: Olly Betts
- Stable release: 1.2.43 / February 28, 2020; 6 years ago
- Preview release: 1.2.42 / September 4, 2020; 6 years ago
- Written in: C++ (survex-aven: wxWidgets)
- Operating system: Microsoft Windows, Mac OS X and Unix-like
- Size: 2.6 MB
- Available in: English
- Type: Cave surveying
- License: GNU General Public License
- Website: www.survex.com
- Repository: git.survex.com/survex

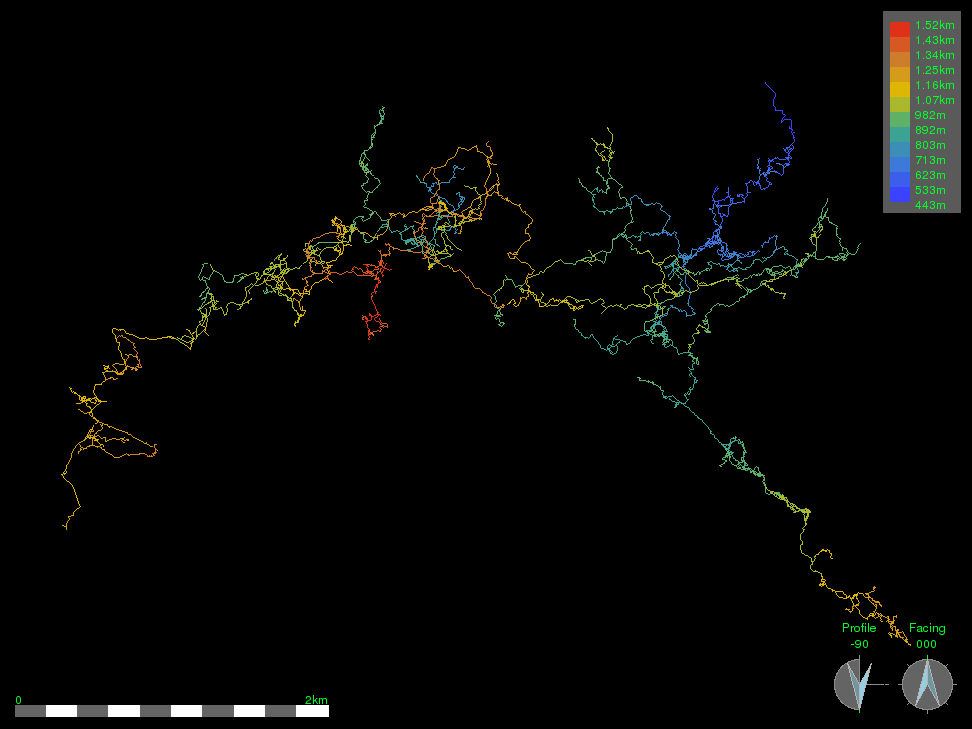
Polygonal overview of Hirlatz cave, rendered with survex-aven

Survex is free and open-source cave surveying software, licensed under the GNU GPL. It is designed to be portable and can be run on a variety of platforms, including Microsoft Windows, Mac OS X, and Unix-like. Survex is actively developing into a complete cave visualization package.

Centreline data is entered using plain-text files, which are processed by "Cavern". The text files contain a hierarchy of cave surveys, each of which consists of a list of survey legs, which join survey stations. This program calculates the real world coordinates of survey stations, taking into account loop closure errors using least-squares minimization. This processed data can then be visualised using a GUI front end called Aven. Survex has no arbitrary limits, and so is particularly good for large complicated cave systems or multiple related cave systems.

Survex was started in 1990 by Olly Betts and Wookey, and more recently Mark Shinwell has developed "Aven". Like most cave surveying software, the motivation for its creation arose from a particular surveying project – Cambridge University Caving Club's explorations in Austria.

Survex is currently being used in many large-scale survey projects, across the world, for example: UK – Ease Gill Caverns Ogof Draenen, Spain – Picos de Europa, China, Austria – Dachstein, Totes Gerbirge, Indonesia, Mulu

== Software that uses Survex ==
CaveWhere uses cavern, a program in the Survex package, for loop closure and positioning survey stations to geographical coordinates.
