= Yordas Cave =

Cave in North Yorkshire, England

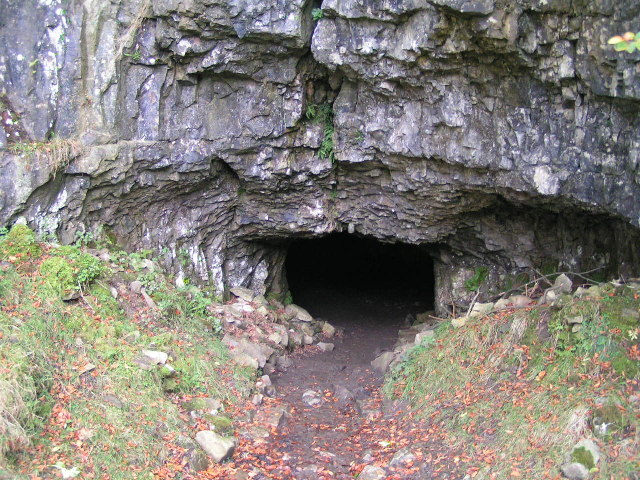
- The main entrance to Yordas Cave

- Location within Yorkshire Dales
- Location: Kingsdale, North Yorkshire, [UK]
- OS grid: SD 7055 7909
- Coordinates: 54°12′24″N 2°27′09″W
- Length: 230 metres (750 ft)
- Height variation: 43 metres (141 ft)
- Elevation: 312 metres (1,024 ft)
- Geology: Carboniferous limestone
- Entrances: 5
- Difficulty: 2 (3 for Yordas Pot)
- Access: No permission is required
- Cave survey: 1980 Gritstone Club survey on Cavemaps

Yordas Cave is a solutional cave in Kingsdale, North Yorkshire, England. It has been renowned since the eighteenth century as a natural curiosity, and was a show cave during the nineteenth century. It is now a popular destination for cavers, walkers, and outdoor activity groups.

== Description ==
The old show cave entrance is in a plantation of trees 100 metres (330 ft) from the road, at the base of a small cliff, at the bottom of a small gorge. A flight of three steps descend from the entrance archway into the Main Chamber, 55 metres (180 ft) long, and 15 metres (49 ft) wide. A stream flows across the floor, and disappears into some low passages to the left. Also on the left, a low passage can be followed for a few metres to the Back Door entrance in a shakehole. At the upstream end of the chamber two passages soon unite in the spray-lashed Chapter House chamber, where a 9-metre (30 ft) waterfall enters and the showcave ended. Above the waterfall, a passage leads to a junction, with the water flowing from a low 20-metre (66 ft) long passage which leads to the base of Yordas Pot, an alternative entrance with a 24-metre (79 ft) shaft. The water enters from a side fissure just below the lip of the shaft. Turning right at the junction leads to a climb, and then to two entrances in the upper gorge. The shafts are equipped with resin P-hangers allowing the cave to be descended and ascended using standard single rope techniques (SRT). The route from the gorge to the bottom entrance may also be descended using canyoning-style techniques, with the last person down a pitch pulling down the rope.

== Etymology ==
The name Yordas is thought to come from the Old Norse 'Jörð á ', translated as 'earth stream'. The association with a giant called Yordas probably came from the tale recounted to John Hutton when being shown around the cave by the local guide in about 1780 "this place had formerly been the residence of a giant called Yordas; from which circumstance he accounts its name."

== Geology and hydrology ==
Yordas Cave is a solutional cave formed in Visean Great Scar limestone from the Mississippian Series of the Carboniferous period. Yordas Beck normally sinks at the top of the gorge, and reappears from a passage near the top of Yordas Pot. From the base of the shaft it follows the passage down to the Chapter House waterfall, before disappearing in confined passages at the end of the Main Chamber. In flood conditions a lake can rise in the Main Chamber up to 2 metres (6 ft 7 in) deep, before the water is able to flow out of the show cave entrance. The underground stream next appears in Kingsdale Master Cave, and it resurges at Keld Head 2.7 kilometres (1.7 mi) down the valley. The Main Chamber is several hundred thousand years old, and was formed by solution under phreatic conditions before the Kingsdale valley had formed and allowed it to drain. The square profile of the chamber has resulted from rock collapses from joints. A number of different false floors which may still be seen clinging to the walls indicate that the cave was subject to cycles of deposition and re-excavation during the recent ice ages.

== History ==
Yordas Cave was first described in detail by Richard Pococke who undertook a tour of Yorkshire in 1751, describing it as "a very grand high cave", although it must have been well known to locals before then as on a visit around 1900 William Palmer noted inscriptions on the wall dating back to 1653. It is marked on Thomas Jefferys 1771 map of Yorkshire, and it was drawn to the public's attention in 1780 by John Hutton in an appendix to Thomas West's "A Guide to the Lakes". He described stopping at Thornton at the bottom of the dale "to procure a guide, candle, tinderbox etc", and he also noted inscriptions "above two hundred years old". By this time the features in the cave had all already acquired the names by which they are known today. Hutton's guide recounted the tale that about fifty years earlier, a pregnant woman travelling alone was taken in labour, and died in the cave. After the publication of Hutton's description, it became a destination for those seeking the picturesque, and is featured in most later guide books of the area, and is often described in magazines. William Wordsworth visited the cave in 1800, and later referred to it in The Prelude, and J. M. W. Turner sketched its exterior and interior in 1816. In July 1817 a devastating flood filled much of the chamber with debris. The guide of the time removed some to expose the stream once more, but much of the height of the chamber was lost. In 1818, William Westall produced a book of aquatinted engraved views of Yorkshire which included three views of Yordas Cave. It was still a showcave when Balderstone visited in around 1890. He had to apply to Braida Garth, the farmhouse 2 kilometres (1.2 mi) down the dale, for the key and a guide and was charged two shillings. The first through trip from the entrance in the upper gorge was made in 1925 by a Yorkshire Ramblers' Club party, accompanied by author Laurence Geoghegan who apparently made full use of the experience when writing his novel The Subterranean Club. The Back Door Entrance was opened up by members of the Northern Cavern and Fell Club in August 1932, when they referred to it as Scotsman's Entrance. The Yordas Pot entrance appeared after a storm in December 1963 when a tree covering the shaft was blown over, and it was descended the following February by members of the Gritstone Club, although the base of the shaft had previously been reached by members of the Northern Speleological Group in November 1959.
