= Kingsdale =

Valley in Yorkshire, England

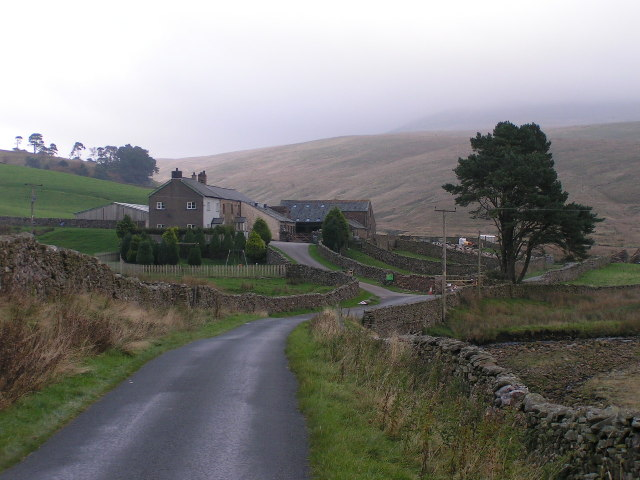
- Kingsdale Head

- Location within North Yorkshire
- Floor elevation: 857 feet (261.3 m)
- Length: 5.5 miles (8.9 km)

Geography
- Country: England
- State/Province: North Yorkshire
- Coordinates: 54.193°N 2.457°W
- Interactive map of Kingsdale

Kingsdale is a valley on the western edge of the Yorkshire Dales National Park in northern England. The name Kingsdale derives from a combination of Old Norse and Old English (Kyen and Dael) which means 'valley where the cows were kept'. Humans were active in Kingsdale from 6,700 BC onwards. Evidence of fire-pits used by hunter-gatherers have been found in the dale.

== History ==
Kingsdale is a short narrow dale, that measures 5.5 miles (8.9 km) from Thornton-in-Lonsdale in the south, to High Moss in the north. During the Last Glacial Maximum, when many of the dales were affected by ice, a glacier carved out the valley of Kingsdale, and left behind a lake impounded at its southern end by a terminal moraine Raven Ray, a piece of land higher than the broad valley beyond it. The presence of fire-pits in the dale dating back to the Mesolithic era (6850–6840 BC), provide evidence of humans using the dale, but only for hunting during the summer months, with the people expected to be from the lowlands. More permanent occupancy of the dale occurred during the Bronze Age, with sooty mounds found in Kingsdale dating back to 1500 BC. The mounds consist of ash, charcoal, sooty remnants and rock fragments, though it is unclear what the mounds were for. Another named mound is the 'Apron Full of Stones', the local legend being that the stones fell from the devil's apron. The site was excavated in 1972 and is a Bronze Age burial mound, though not made with limestone boulders, but from gritstone from outside of the valley.

The enclosing of the land in the valley around 1820, involved the reclamation of some areas, and the beck was also straightened. This gives the valley, what W. R. Mitchell calls, "..an unusually neat appearance."

The larger part of the valley lies within the county of North Yorkshire but its highest reaches fall just within Cumbria. It is defined by the hills of Whernside to its east and Gragareth to its west. Kingsdale is drained by the south-westward flowing Kingsdale Beck which assumes the name River Twiss before joining the River Doe at Ingleton to become the River Greta. Two large waterfalls are on the lower reaches of the River Twiss; Thornton Force is 49 feet (15 m) high over one drop, whereas Pecca Falls are a series of waterfall drops covering 115 feet (35 m). The ledge at the top of the waterfall of Thornton Force is made up of the Great Scar Limestone, the middle is cobbles from a sea of the Carboniferous period (350 million years ago), and the lower part, where the basin is, is composed of Ordovician slate which dates back 530 million years.

Kingsdale Beck is frequently dry on the surface between Kingsdale Head and Keld Head, with the water travelling underground before resurfacing at Keld Head. The same thing happens to the River Skirfare in Littondale. Spells of wet weather often bring about a wall of water that travels down the valley across the dry riverbed.

The single minor public road which serves the valley is an old packhorse route that connected Ingleton with Deepdale, then Dentdale, and which also forms the NCR 68 and the Yorkshire Dales Cycle Way. This road was a rough track until just after the Second World War, when it was re-laid with tarmac, and reaches a height of 1,552 feet (473 m). On the west high ground of the valley is a track known as Turbary Road (turbary being an ancient right to cut peat or turf for fuel). The route is so named as it was where the peat-cutters would transport their peat down the valley. There are several nationally important caves within the valley (such as Rowten Pot and Yordas Cave) and the resurgence of Keld Head. Several other caves exist under the valley; Kail Pot, Swinsto Cave, King Pot, Jingling Pot, Valley Entrance, and Bull Pot.
