= Cave survey =

Map of all or part of a cave system

A cave survey

A cave survey is a map of all or part of a cave system, which may be produced to meet differing standards of accuracy depending on the cave conditions and equipment available underground. Cave surveying and cartography, i.e. the creation of an accurate, detailed map, is one of the most common technical activities undertaken within a cave and is a fundamental part of speleology. Surveys can be used to compare caves to each other by length, depth and volume, may reveal clues on speleogenesis, provide a spatial reference for other areas of scientific study and assist visitors with route-finding.

Traditionally, cave surveys are produced in two-dimensional form due to the confines of print, but given the three-dimensional environment inside a cave, modern techniques using computer aided design are increasingly used to allow a more realistic representation of a cave system.

== History ==
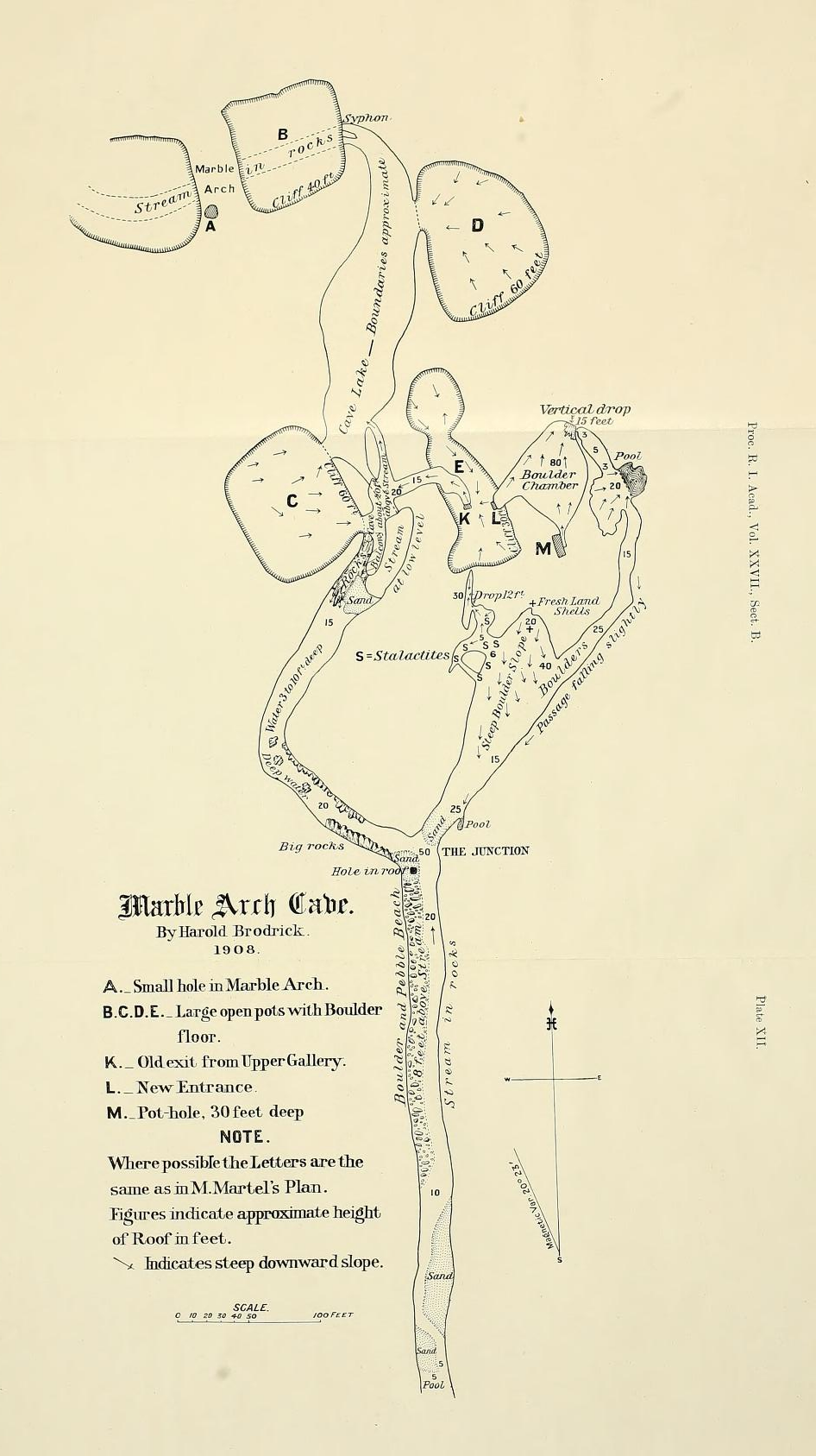
1908 survey of Marble Arch Caves by the Yorkshire Ramblers' Club

The first known plan of a cave dates from 1546, and was of a man-made cavern in tufa called the Stufe di Nerone (Nero's Oven) in Pozzuoli near Naples in Italy. The first natural cave to be mapped was the Baumannshöhle in Germany, of which a sketch from 1656 survives.

Another early survey dates from before 1680, and was made by John Aubrey of Long Hole in the Cheddar Gorge. It consists of an elevational section of the cave. Numerous other surveys of caves were made in the following years, though most are sketches and are limited in accuracy. The first cave that is likely to have been accurately surveyed with instruments is the Grotte de Miremont in France. This was surveyed by a civil engineer in 1765 and includes numerous cross-sections. Édouard-Alfred Martel was the first person to describe surveying techniques. His surveys were made by having an assistant walk down the passage until they were almost out of sight. Martel would then take a compass bearing to the assistant's light, and measure the distance by pacing up to the assistant. This would equate to a modern-day BCRA Grade 2 survey.

The first cave to have its centreline calculated by a computer is the Fergus River Cave in Ireland, which was plotted by members of the UBSS in 1964. The software was programmed onto a large university mainframe computer and a paper plot was produced.

== Methodology ==
There are many variations to surveying methodology, but most are based on a similar set of steps which haven't changed fundamentally in 250 years, although the instruments (compass and tape) have become smaller and more accurate. Since the late 1990s, digital instruments such as distometers have started to change the process, leading to the advent of fully paperless surveying around 2007. The main variation on the normal methodology detailed below have been devices such as LIDAR and SONAR surveyors that produce a point cloud rather than a series of linked stations. Video-based surveying also exists in prototype form.

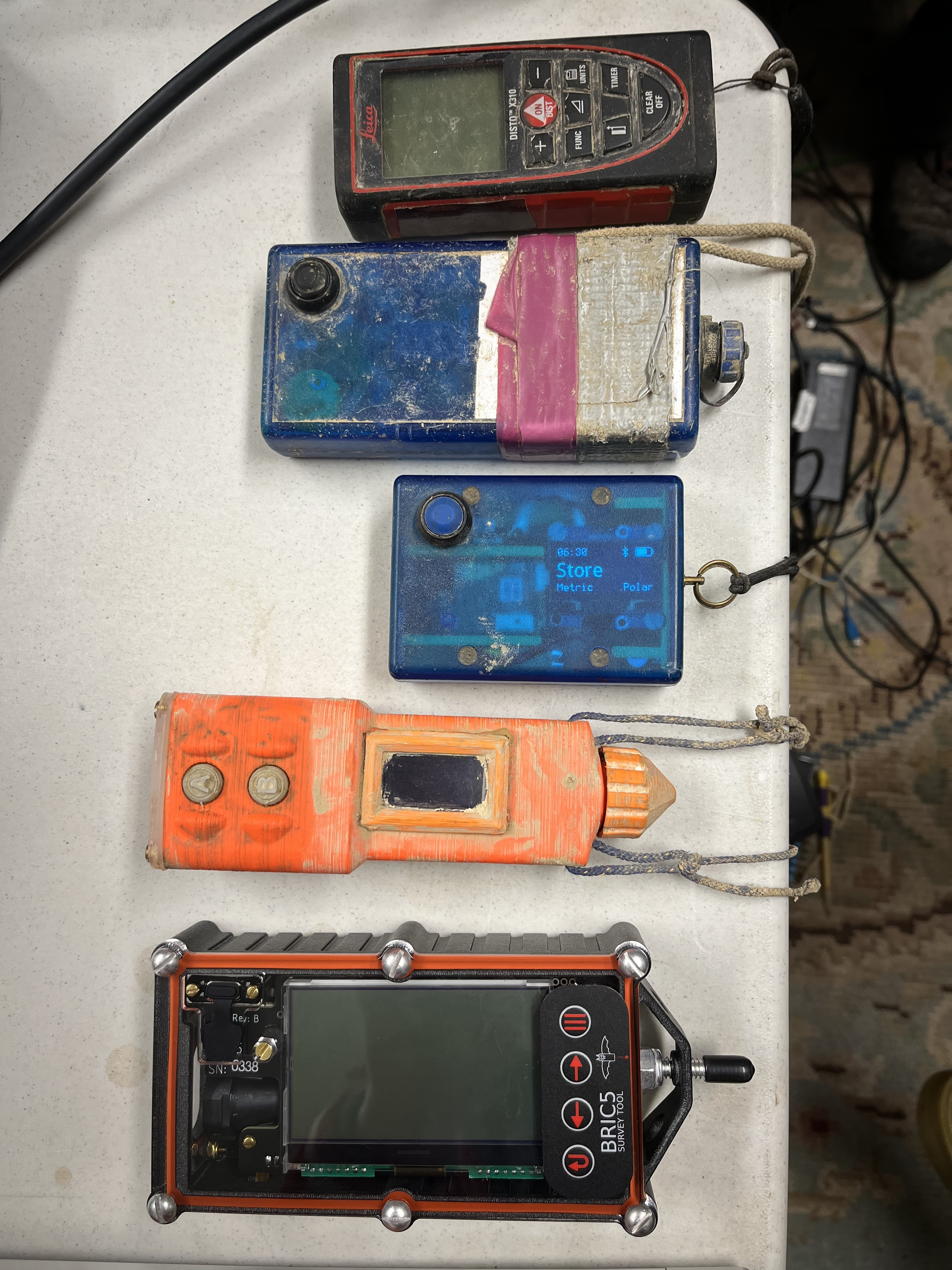
Cave surveying instruments: DistoX2, SAP2, SAP5, SAP6, BRIC5

=== Surveying ===
A survey team begins at a fixed point (such as the cave entrance) and measures a series of consecutive line-of-sight measurements between stations. The stations are temporary fixed locations chosen chiefly for their ease of access and clear sight along the cave passage. In some cases, survey stations may be permanently marked to create a fixed reference point to which to return at a later date.

The measurements taken between the stations include:

- direction (azimuth or bearing) taken with a compass
- inclination from horizontal (dip) taken with a clinometer
- distance measured with a low-stretch tape or laser rangefinder
- optionally, distance to surrounding walls – left, right, up, down (LRUD)

Coincident with recording straight-line data, details of passage dimensions, shape, gradual or sudden changes in elevation, the presence or absence of still or flowing water, the location of notable features and the material on the floor are recorded, often by means of a sketch map.

In 2000's a Swiss caver Bert Heeb modified a commercial laser rangefinder to add inclination and direction sensors, creating DistoX2 which became extremely popular instrument for "paperless surveying", as it allowed to record all survey parameters along with a single laser "shot". Subsequently, a number of other projects followed - CaveSniper, Shetland Attack Pony (SAP), BRIC.

=== Drawing a line-plot ===
Later, the cartographer analyzes the recorded data, converting them into two-dimensional measurements by way of geometrical calculations. From there, they create a line-plot; a scaled geometrical representation of the path through the cave.

=== Finalising ===
The cartographer then draws details around the line-plot, using the additional data of passage dimensions, water flow and floor/wall topography recorded at the time, to produce a completed cave survey. Cave surveys drawn on paper are often presented in two-dimensional plan and/or profile views, while computer surveys may simulate three dimensions. Although primarily designed to be functional, some cavers consider cave surveys as an art form.

== Hydrolevelling ==
Hydrolevelling is an alternative to measuring depth with clinometer and tape that has a long history of use in Russia. The technique is regularly used in building construction for finding two points with the same height, as in levelling a floor. In the simplest case, a tube with both ends open is used, attached to a strip of wood, and the tube is filled with water and the depth at each end marked. In Russia, measuring the depth of caves by hydrolevelling began in the 1970s, and was considered to be the most accurate means of measuring depth despite the difficulties in using the cumbersome equipment of the time. Interest in the method has been revived following the discovery of Voronja on the Arabica Massif in the Caucasus – currently the world's second deepest cave.

The hydrolevel device used in recent Voronja expeditions comprises a 50-metre (160 ft) transparent tube filled with water, which is coiled or placed on a reel. A rubber glove which acts as a reservoir is placed on one end of the tube, and a metal box with a transparent window is placed on the other. A diver's digital wristwatch with a depth gauge function is submerged in the box. If the rubber glove is placed on one station and the box with the depth gauge is placed on a lower one, then the hydrostatic pressure between the two points depends only on the difference in heights and the density of the water, i.e. the route of the tube does not affect the pressure in the box. Reading the depth gauge gives the apparent depth change between the higher and lower station. Depth changes are 'apparent' because depth gauges are calibrated for sea water, and the hydrolevel is filled with fresh water. Therefore, a coefficient must be determined to convert apparent depth changes to true depth changes. Adding the readings for consecutive pairs of stations gives the total depth of the cave.

== Accuracy ==
The accuracy, or grade, of a cave survey is dependent on the methodology of measurement. A common survey grading system is that created by the British Cave Research Association in the 1960s, which uses a scale of six grades.

=== BCRA grading system ===
==== BCRA gradings for a cave line survey ====
Grade 1
Sketch of low accuracy where no measurements have been made
Grade 2 (use only if necessary, see note 7)
May be used, if necessary, to describe a sketch that is intermediate in accuracy between Grade 1 & 3
Grade 3
A rough magnetic survey. Horizontal & vertical angles measured to ±2.5 °; distances measured to ±50 cm; station position error less than 50 cm.
Grade 4 (use only if necessary, see note 7)
May be used, if necessary, to describe a survey that fails to attain all the requirements of Grade 5 but is more accurate than a Grade 3 survey.
Grade 5
A Magnetic survey. Horizontal and vertical angles measured to ±1 °; distances should be observed and recorded to the nearest centimetre and station positions identified to less than 10 cm.
Grade 6
A magnetic survey that is more accurate than grade 5, (see note 5).
Grade X
A survey that is based primarily on the use of a theodolite or total station instead of a compass, (see notes 6 and 10 below).

===== Notes =====
1. The above table is a summary, omitting some technical details and definitions; the definitions of the survey grades given above must be read in conjunction with these notes.
2. In all cases it is necessary to follow the spirit of the definition and not just the letter.
3. To attain Grade 3 it is necessary to use a clinometer in passages having appreciable slope.
4. To attain Grade 5 it is essential for instruments to be properly calibrated, and all measurements must be taken from a point within a 10 cm diameter sphere centred on the survey station.
5. A Grade 6 survey requires the compass to be used at the limit of possible accuracy, i.e. accurate to ±0.5 °; clinometer readings must be to the same accuracy. Station position error must be less than ±2.5 cm, which will require the use of tripods at all stations or other fixed station markers ("roofhooks").
6. A Grade X survey must include on the drawing notes descriptions of the instruments and techniques used, together with an estimate of the probable accuracy of the survey compared with Grade 3, 5 or 6 surveys.
7. Grades 2 and 4 are for use only when, at some stage of the survey, physical conditions have prevented the survey from attaining all the requirements for the next higher grade and it is not practical to re-survey.
8. Caving organisations, etc., are encouraged to reproduce Table 1 and Table 2 in their own publications; permission is not required from BCRA to do so, but the tables must not be reprinted without these notes.
9. Grade X is only potentially more accurate than Grade 6. It should never be forgotten that the theodolite/Total Station is a complex precision instrument that requires considerable training and regular practice if serious errors are not to be made through its use!
10. In drawing up, the survey co-ordinates must be calculated and not hand-drawn with scale rule and protractor to obtain Grade 5.

==== BCRA gradings for recording cave passage detail ====
Class A
All passage details based on memory.
Class B
Passage details estimated and recorded in the cave.
Class C
Measurements of detail made at survey stations only.
Class D
Measurements of detail made at survey stations and wherever else needed to show significant changes in passage dimensions.

===== Notes =====
1. The accuracy of the detail should be similar to the accuracy of the line.
2. Normally only one of the following combinations of survey grades should be used:
  - 1A
  - 3B or 3C
  - 5C or 5D
  - 6D
  - XA, XB, XC or XD

=== Survey error detection ===
The equipment used to undertake a cave survey continues to improve. The use of computers, inertia systems, and electronic distance finders has been proposed, but few practical underground applications have evolved at present.

Despite these advances, faulty instruments, imprecise measurements, recording errors or other factors may still result in an inaccurate survey, and these errors are often difficult to detect. Some cave surveyors measure each station twice, recording a back-sight to the previous station in the opposite direction. A back-sight compass reading that is different by 180 degrees and a clinometer reading that is the same value but with the reverse direction (positive rather than negative, for example) indicates that the original measurement was accurate.

When a loop within a cave is surveyed back to its starting point, the resulting line-plot should also form a closed loop. Any gap between the first and last stations is called a loop-closure error. If no single error is apparent, one may assume the loop-closure error is due to cumulative inaccuracies, and cave survey software can 'close the loop' by averaging possible errors throughout the loop stations. Loops to test survey accuracy may also be made by surveying across the surface between multiple entrances to the same cave.

The use of a low-frequency cave radio can also verify survey accuracy. A receiving unit on the surface can pinpoint the depth and location of a transmitter in a cave passage by measurement of the geometry of its radio waves. A survey over the surface from the receiver back to the cave entrance forms an artificial loop with the underground survey, whose loop-closure error can then be determined.

In the past, cavers were reluctant to redraw complex cave maps after detecting survey errors. Today, computer cartography can automatically redraw cave maps after data has been corrected.

== Surveying software ==
There are a large number of surveying packages available on various computer platforms, most of which have been developed by cavers with a basis in computer programming. Many of the packages perform particularly well for specific tasks, and as such many cave surveyors will not solely choose one product over another for all cartographic tasks.

A popular program for producing a centerline survey is Survex, which was originally developed by members of the Cambridge University Caving Club for processing survey data from club expeditions to Austria. It was released to the public in 1992. The centerline data can then be exported in various formats and the cave detail drawn in with various other programmes such as AutoCAD, Adobe Illustrator and Inkscape. Other programmes such as 'Tunnel' and Therion have full centerline and map editing capabilities. Therion notably, when it closes survey loops, warps the passages to fit over their length, meaning that entire passages do not have to be redrawn. Unlike Therion's 2D warping capabilities, CaveWhere warps passages in 3D. This includes warping plan and profile sketches. CaveWhere also supports loop closure (using Survex) and provides a user friendly interface for entering and visualizing cave survey data.

Terrestrial LiDAR units are increasing significantly in accuracy and decreasing in price. Several Caves have been "scanned" using both "time of flight" and "phase shift" LiDAR units. The differences are in the relative accuracies available to each. The Oregon Caves National Park, was LiDAR scanned in August 2011, as were the Paisley Caves Archaeological dig site in SE Oregon. Both were scanned with a FARO Focus Phase shift scanner with +/-2mm accuracy. The Oregon Caves were scanned from the main public entrance to the 110 exit and were loop surveyed to the point of beginning. The data is not yet available for public use, but copies are retained by both the US Park Service and i-TEN Associates in Portland, Oregon.

== Automated methods ==
In recent years an underground geographic positioning technology called HORTA has been utilized in the mining industry. The inertial navigation system technology utilizes a gyroscope and an accelerometer to aid in 3D-position determination.

Such automated methods have provided a more than fifty-fold increase in underground surveying productivity with more accurate and finer detail maps as well.

== See also ==
- Cave diving – Diving in water-filled caves
- Caving – Recreational pastime of exploring cave systems
- List of longest caves
