= Ingleborough Hall =

Historic building in Clapham, North Yorkshire

- Gateway to Ingleborough Hall

General information
- Type: Country house
- Architectural style: Neoclassical / Greek Revival
- Location: Clapham
- Coordinates: 54°07′08″N 2°23′20″W
- Grid position: SD 74744 69324
- Construction started: 1814
- Completed: 1814
- Client: James Farrer
- Owner: Private

Technical details
- Structural system: Sandstone ashlar

Design and construction
- Architect: William Atkinson

Listed Building – Grade II*
- Designated: 20 February 1958
- Reference no.: 1132400

Ingleborough Hall is a 19th-century country house in the village of Clapham, North Yorkshire, England. Designed in the Greek Revival style by the architect William Atkinson, the hall was built in 1814 for the landowner James Farrer. It was designated a Grade II* listed building on 20 February 1958.

== History ==
The Farrer family acquired the Clapham estate in the 18th century. In 1814, James Farrer commissioned the London-based architect William Atkinson to construct a new family seat to replace an earlier residence. The house remained the principal seat of the Farrer family throughout the 19th and early 20th centuries.

The hall is particularly associated with the plant collector and botanist Reginald Farrer (1880–1920), who spent his childhood at Ingleborough Hall. Farrer established an extensive rock garden and plant nursery in the grounds, introducing numerous East Asian plant species—collected during his expeditions to China, Tibet, and Upper Burma—to British horticulture.

During the second world war Stone House School was temporarily relocated from its home in Broadstairs, Kent to Ingleborough Hall. The prep school's headmaster at the time was Captain John Oliver Farrer MC (1894-1942), a second cousin of Sidney Farrer, who was the brother of Reginald and the 'squire' of the hall at that time. That presaged the changes which followed the death of Oliver Farrer in the mid-20th century when the estate was adapted for institutional use. In 1948, the hall was acquired by West Riding County Council and converted into an outdoor education centre, offering residential trips and outdoor activities for schoolchildren. The centre was later operated by City of Bradford Metropolitan District Council until its closure in 2023, after which the property returned to private ownership.

== Architecture ==
Ingleborough Hall is built of stone ashlar with a slate roof. The principal building comprises a two-storey main block facing south, flanked by symmetrical single-storey pavilions linked by short curtain walls.

=== Exterior ===
The south-facing main facade is arranged across five bays.< The ground floor features rusticated stone walling, while the upper floor is smooth ashlar. The central three bays project slightly beneath a pediment and feature a ground-floor portico supported by Doric columns. Fenestration consists of timber sash windows set within plain stone surrounds. The side pavilions feature pedimented gables and recessed niches.

=== Interior ===
The interior retains original Neoclassical decorative features from the 1814 construction. The central entrance hall features a cantilevered stone staircase with decorative iron balusters, topped by a glass dome. Ground-floor reception rooms retain moulded plaster cornices, marble chimneypieces, and panelled timber doors.

== Grounds ==
The hall is situated within extensive landscaped grounds, including woodland, a lake, and a walled garden. The grounds contain the remains of Reginald Farrer's alpine rock garden, created in the early 20th century along the gorge leading to Clapham Cave.

== See also ==
- Grade II* listed buildings in North Yorkshire (district)
- Reginald Farrer
- Listed buildings in Clapham cum Newby
