= Listed buildings in Clapham cum Newby =

Clapham cum Newby is a civil parish in the county of North Yorkshire, England. It contains 50 listed buildings that are recorded in the National Heritage List for England. Of these, one is listed at Grade II*, the middle of the three grades, and the others are at Grade II, the lowest grade. The parish contains the villages of Clapham and Newby and the surrounding countryside. Most of the listed buildings are houses, cottages and associated structures, farmhouses and farm buildings. The others include a church, a cross base, bridges, boundary stones, a school and a railway waiting room.

== Key ==
Grade	Criteria
II*	Particularly important buildings of more than special interest
II	Buildings of national importance and special interest

== Buildings ==
Name and location	Photograph	Date	Notes	Grade
Cross base 54.11758°N 2.39168°W		14th century (probable)	The cross base is in millstone grit, it is about 60 centimetres (24 in) square and 40 centimetres (16 in) high, and stands on three stone steps. The upper parts were added in 1897.	II
Clapdale Farmhouse; 54.13259°N 2.38280°W		15th century	The farmhouse is pebbledashed, with stone dressings, and it has a stone slate roof. There are two storeys and four bays. The doorway has a chamfered surround, and most of the windows are mullioned, some with slate hood moulds. At the rear is a small turret with a square base.	II
St James' Church; 54.12029°N 2.39040°W		15th century	The oldest part of the church is the tower, with most of the rest dating from 1814, and alterations in 1899. It is built in stone with a slate roof, and consists of a nave, north and south aisles, a south porch, a chancel, and a west tower. The tower has three stages, diagonal buttresses, and a west doorway with a moulded surround, a Tudor arch and a hood mould, above which is a three-light window with a pointed arch. Over this is a small window with a trefoil head, a clock face, bell openings with two lights, and at the top is an embattled parapet with a central gargoyle on each side.	II
Newby Hall and barn 54.12515°N 2.41686°W	—	15th century	A farmhouse in stone with quoins and a stone slate roof with weathered crocketed finials. There are two storeys and an L-shaped plan, with a main range, a short northeast wing, and an outshut in the angle. The windows vary, some are mullioned, and some mullions are missing, and others are in Perpendicular style. The adjoining barn contains an entrance with a chamfered surround, and incorporates a re-set decorated wooden lintel.	II
Cruck Barn, Newby Cote; 54.13018°N 2.41110°W		16th century (probable)	The barn and stable, which were later extended, are in limestone on a plinth, with quoins and a stone slate roof. There are two storeys and nine bays, with the single-bay stable at the north end. The barn contains a segmental-arch cart entrance with voussoirs, and two doorways with segmental-arched lintels; all these openings have alternating jamb stones. The other openings include windows, a pitching hole and slit vents. Inside there are six cruck trusses.	II
Wenning Hipping; 54.10344°N 2.41075°W	—	16th century	The house is in stone on a boulder plinth, with alternating quoins and a stone flag roof. There are two storeys and three bays, and to the right is a truncated barn. In the right bay is an inserted doorway with quoined jambs and a shaped lintel. Some windows are mullioned, and others are replacement sashes.	II
Stables, Clapdale Farm; 54.13255°N 2.38303°W		17th century	The stables are in stone with a stone slate roof and two bays. In the centre is an entrance with a chamfered surround. This is flanked by tall transomed windows, each blocked below the transom and the upper part containing pigeon holes. There are more pigeon holes on the front and the sides.	II
Croft House; 54.12515°N 2.41783°W	—	17th century	The house is in stone with quoins and a stone slate roof. There are two storeys and four bays. The doorway has a chamfered surround and a decorated lintel. The windows are mixed; some are double chamfered and mullioned, some mullions are missing, some are sashes and there is a blocked fire window.	II
Hazle Hall; 54.10773°N 2.41847°W	—	17th century	The house is in stone, with quoins, and a stone slate roof with gable coping and a shaped kneeler on the right. There are two storeys, three bays and a rear wing. The central doorway is round-headed with Doric pilasters and a keystone, and to its left is a partly blocked doorway with a chamfered surround and an inserted window. Most of the windows are casements, and there are also chamfered mullioned windows, at the rear is a round-headed stair window with impost blocks and a keystone, and in the rear wing is a transomed stair window.	II
Newby Cote; 54.13060°N 2.41106°W		Mid 17th century (probable)	A pebbledashed farmhouse, with stone dressings, eaves modillions, and a stone slate roof with coped gables and shaped kneelers. There are two storeys and five bays. On the front is a two-storey gabled porch, the entrance with a moulded surround. The windows are double-chamfered with moulded mullions, those in the ground floor with hood moulds. In the left return is a re-set dated and initialled lintel.	II
Lower Hardacre Farmhouse; 54.10727°N 2.43579°W		1664	The farmhouse is in stone with a stone slate roof, two storeys and three bays. On the front is a porch that has an entrance in the left return with a moulded surround, initialled stones in the jambs, and a dated initialled lintel. Some of the windows are mullioned, in the upper floor is a cross window, and over the ground floor openings is a continuous hood mould.	II
Keasden Head Farmhouse and cartshed 54.07139°N 2.43308°W	—	1668	The farmhouse and attached cartshed are in limewashed stone, with painted stone dressings and two storeys. The farmhouse has a stone slate roof and three bays. The central doorway has a moulded surround and a decorated dated and initialled lintel, and the windows are mullioned. The cartshed on the left has a corrugated asbestos roof, and a single bay. It contains a basket-arched wagon entrance, and there are external steps leading to a hayloft.	II
Bridge Cottage; 54.12563°N 2.41704°W		1672	The cottage is in limewashed stone with painted stone dressings and a stone slate roof. There are two storeys, a main range of two bays, and a recessed single-bay wing on the right. The doorway in the main range has a slate lintel, there is a small window, and the other windows on the front are casements. In the right wing is a doorway with a moulded surround and a decorated initialled and dated lintel.	II
Town Head Barn; 54.12563°N 2.41546°W		1675	The barn is in stone with a stone slate roof, two storeys and two bays, and to the right are two later extensions and a lean-to. The wagon entrance has a segmental head, a chamfered surround, and a moulded, dated and initialled keystone. Above it is a hood on massive corbels. The openings include a stable door, windows, a loft entrance and vents.	II
Balderstones and Balderstone Barn; 54.13062°N 2.41030°W	—	Late 17th century (probable)	The farmhouse is rendered, with painted stone dressings, eaves modillions, and a stone slate roof. There are two storeys, and a continuous rear outshut. The doorway has a chamfered surround and a flat head, some of the windows are double-chamfered and mullioned, others are casements, and some have hood moulds.	II
Brookside; 54.12540°N 2.41865°W	—	Late 17th century	The house is in stone with a stone slate roof, two storeys and three bays. The central doorway has plain jambs, moulded impost blocks and a basket-arched lintel. The windows are mullioned, with some mullions missing.	II
Chapel House; 54.12582°N 2.41860°W	—	Late 17th century	A stone house with painted stone dressings, a slate roof, two storeys and two bays. The doorway has plain jambs on square bases, moulded capitals, and a flat-arched lintel. In the ground floor are three-light flat-faced mullioned windows, and the upper floor contains two-light chamfered mullioned windows.	II
Crooklands Farmhouse; 54.13258°N 2.41779°W	—	Late 17th century	The farmhouse, which was later extended, is in stone, partly limewashed, and has a stone slate roof and two storeys. The earlier part has two bays, and on the front is a gabled porch, the entrance with a Tudor arched head. The windows are mullioned, and contain a mix of sashes, casements and fixed lights. The extension to the left has a single bay.	II
Near Goat Gap Farmhouse, barn and shippon 54.12801°N 2.43408°W		Late 17th century	The farmhouse, later a barn and shippon, is now derelict. It is in stone with a stone slate roof, two storeys and four bays. On the front is a porch with a corrugated iron roof. The windows are mullioned, some mullions are missing, and some have hood moulds.	II
The Old Manor House; 54.11806°N 2.39129°W		1701	The former manor house, later used for other purposes, is stone with a stone slate roof, two storeys and four bays. In the third bay is a projecting gabled porch that has an entrance with a moulded surround, a decorated, dated and initialled lintel, and a stepped hood mould. Above is a three-light chamfered window with moulded mullions, a stepped hood mould, and pigeon holes in a triangular pattern. To the left of the porch is a doorway with a plain surround, and the windows are mullioned, those in the ground floor with hood moulds. Inside, there is a massive inglenook fireplace.	II
Town Head Farmhouse; 54.12577°N 2.41565°W	—	1720	The farmhouse is in stone, with quoins, and a slate roof with shaped kneelers. There are three storeys and four bays. In the second bay is a projecting gabled porch that has an entrance with a moulded surround, a segmental dated and initialled lintel, and a hood mould. Above it is a three-light window with a chamfered surround, a hood mould, pigeonholes in a triangular pattern, and a slate sundial with an iron gnomon. The windows are mullioned with chamfered surrounds.	II
Bull and Cave Farmhouse; 54.11742°N 2.39298°W	—	1725	The farmhouse is in stone with a stone slate roof, two storeys and two bays. The central doorway has a dated and initialled lintel. To its left is a mullioned window, and the other windows are sashes.	II
Dubsyke Farmhouse; 54.08636°N 2.41424°W	—	Early 18th century	The farmhouse is in limewashed stone with stone dressings and a slate roof. There are two storeys and two bays. In the centre are 20th-century French windows, and the windows are mullioned with sashes, those in the ground floor with hood moulds. At the rear are the remains of earlier chamfered mullioned windows.	II
Nutta Farmhouse; 54.10834°N 2.41446°W	—	Early 18th century	The farmhouse is limewashed, with painted stone dressings and a tile roof. There are two storeys and two bays. The doorway in the gable end has a chamfered surround, and on the front are two three-light chamfered mullioned windows in each floor containing casements.	II
Brokken Bridge; 54.11848°N 2.39181°W		18th century (probable)	A footbridge over Clapham Beck, it is in stone, and consists of a single segmental arch. The parapet and wing walls are coped.	II
Church Bridge; 54.12022°N 2.39123°W		18th century (probable)	The bridge, which was widened in about 1830, carries a road over Clapham Beck. It is in stone, and consists of a single segmental arch. There is a string course at the base of the parapet, pilasters on each side, and the parapet and wing walls are coped. On the east and west of the upstream sides are cast iron boundary posts.	II
Clapham Bridge; 54.11734°N 2.39202°W		18th century	The bridge carries the B6480 road over Clapham Beck. It is in stone, and consists of a single segmental arch, and it was later widened on the downstream side. The parapet has later coping.	II
Fall View; 54.12080°N 2.39091°W		Mid 18th century	The house is pebbledashed, with painted stone dressings, shaped eaves modillions, and a stone slate roof. There are two storeys and three bays. The doorway has Tuscan pilasters, a fanlight and an open pediment, and the windows are sashes. At the rear is a blocked former entrance with a moulded surround.	II
High Hazel Hall; 54.10936°N 2.42115°W	—	Mid 18th century	A farmhouse in limewashed stone with painted stone dressings and a stone slate roof. There are two storeys and two bays, and later extensions. The former central entrance has a plain surround, the windows are mullioned and contain casements, and the entrance is in the right gable end.	II
Rose Cottage; 54.11763°N 2.39267°W	—	Mid 18th century	The cottage is in stone with a stone slate roof, two storeys and two bays. The doorway has a moulded rusticated surround, lintel and voussoirs. Some windows are mullioned, and the others are a mix of sashes and casements with plain surrounds. There is a continuous hood mould over the ground floor openings.	II
The Beeches (middle cottage); 54.12067°N 2.39104°W	—	18th century (probable)	The cottage is in stone with painted stone dressings, quoins, shaped eaves modillions, and a stone slate roof. There are two storeys and two bays. In the centre is a doorway with a plain surround, and the windows are sashes.	II
The Beeches (upper cottage); 54.12073°N 2.39097°W	—	Mid 18th century (probable)	A stone cottage with a pilaster on the right, and a stone slate roof, two storeys and one bay. The doorway to the right has a plain surround. The windows are sashes with plain surrounds, and the upper floor window has two lights and a flat-faced mullion.	II
Wenning Bridge; 54.10444°N 2.41032°W		Mid 18th century	The bridge carries Wenning Bank over the River Wenning. It is in stone, and consists of two segmental arches. The bridge has triangular cutwaters, a string course, and a parapet with moulded coping. The later wing walls have rounded coping.	II
Yew Tree Cottages; 54.11981°N 2.39175°W		18th century	A house and a cottage, later four cottages, in stone, with paired eaves modillions, and stone slate roofs. The former house has three storeys and four bays, a central doorway with pilasters and moulded capitals, a basket-arched head to the lintel, a pulvinated frieze and a cornice. The former cottage to the right has two storeys and four bays, a porch on the left, and a doorway with a plain surround to the right. The windows in both parts are sashes.	II
Gildersbank Cottage and Spindle Tree Cottage; 54.11839°N 2.39129°W		Late 18th century	A pair of cottages in rendered stone, with chamfered quoins and a stone slate roof. They have two storeys and each cottage has sash windows in plain surrounds. Gildersbank Cottage, on the left, has three bays and a central doorway with a moulded surround and a cornice, and Spindle Tree Cottage has two bays and a doorway with a plain surround.	II
Hall Garth; 54.11932°N 2.39231°W		Late 18th century	The house is in stone, with a cornice and a hipped slate roof. There are two storeys and five bays, the outer bays slightly recessed. The central doorway has engaged Tuscan columns, a rectangular fanlight and a moulded cornice. The windows are sashes; those flanking the doorway are tripartite with engaged columns.	II
New Inn; 54.11707°N 2.39171°W		1776	The public house is rendered, with quoins, shaped eaves modillions, and a slate roof. There are two storeys and four bays. The central entrance has a slate hood on shaped brackets, and the doorway has a rectangular fanlight. To the right is a doorway with a plain surround, and the windows are tripartite sash windows with flat-faced mullions.	II
Former saw mill and log store 54.12097°N 2.39084°W		Late 18th to early 19th century	A barn in the Ingleborough Estate, later used as a saw mill and for other purposes, is in limestone with quoins and a slate roof. There are two storeys and eight bays, and a rear lean-to. On the front are small-paned windows, and at the ends are doorways. At the western end the doorways have quoined surrounds, and in the upper floor is a taking-in door. To the west is a log store, mainly open, with a single storey and five square pillars.	II
Newby Cote Farmhouse; 54.13042°N 2.41026°W		Late 18th to early 19th century	The farmhouse is rendered, with painted sone dressings, quoins and a tile roof. There are two storeys and three bays, and a recessed single-bay wing on the right. The central doorway has a plain surround and a moulded cornice, and the windows are sashes with plain surrounds.	II
Ingleborough Hall; 54.11943°N 2.38871°W	—	c. 1814	A country house designed by William Atkinson, and later used for other purposes. It is in stone with sill bands and a hipped slate roof, and has two storeys. The south garden front has seven bays, the central three bays forming a two-storey domed bow window, with four giant engaged Greek Doric columns and an entablature, and it contains three French windows. The west entrance front has three bays, and has a massive portico of engaged Doric columns in antis, and a projecting entablature with triglyphs, metopes, and a cornice with guttae. The ground floor windows in both fronts are sashes, and in the upper floor they are casements.	II*
Icehouse, Ingleborough Hall; 54.11967°N 2.38803°W	—	c. 1815	The ice house is in stone, and has a rectangular entrance to a corridor about 5 metres (16 ft) long. The ice well is circular, about 14 metres (46 ft) high, with a domed ceiling.	II
Cottage at Gildersbank; 54.11853°N 2.39119°W	—	Early 19th century	The cottage, which incorporates earlier material, is rendered, and has a stone slate roof. There are two storeys and two bays. The central doorway and the windows, which are sashes, have plain surrounds, and at the rear is a 17th-century projecting stair turret.	II
The Beeches (lower cottage); 54.12063°N 2.39118°W	—	Early 19th century	A pebbledashed cottage with painted stone dressings, shaped eaves modillions and a stone slate roof. There are two storeys and two bays. In the centre is a trellised porch, and the windows are sashes with plain surrounds.	II
Wenning Bank; 54.10526°N 2.40892°W		Early 19th century	Originally a Sandemanian meeting house, later a private house, it is rendered, with stone dressings, and a tile roof with coped gables and kneelers. There are two storeys and three bays, and a left lean-to. In the ground floor is a casement window, the upper floor contains two sash windows, between which is a larger round-headed window with moulded impost blocks, and a keystone.	II
Servants' tunnels and gateway, Ingleborough Hall; 54.12023°N 2.38951°W		1833	There are two tunnels providing access to the hall. The left tunnel gives access to the former stables, and its entrance has a round arch with voussoirs, a string course and a parapet with engaged pilasters. The right tunnel gave access to the service wing, and has a blocked segmental arch, a string course at impost level, a keystone, and a string course to the parapet. A wall links the hall with the church, and contains a gateway that has a round arch with voussoirs, an impost band, pilasters, a string course at the base of the cornice, and gates in wrought iron.	II
Boundary stone northeast of Bowsber Farmhouse; 54.11151°N 2.38073°W		Early to mid 19th century (probable)	The parish boundary stone is in painted millstone grit, and consists of a slab with a pointed head about 1 metre (3 ft 3 in) high and 1 metre (3 ft 3 in) wide. It is divided by a vertical groove, on the left side is inscribed "CLAPHAM" and on the right side "AUSTWICK".	II
Boundary stone southeast of Cod Bank Barn; 54.13703°N 2.42825°W		Early to mid 19th century (probable)	The parish boundary stone is in millstone grit, and consists of a slab with a flat head about 1 metre (3 ft 3 in) high and 1 metre (3 ft 3 in) wide. There are two horizontal lines and a vertical groove, on the left side is inscribed "CLAPHAM" and on the right side "INGLETON".	II
Former Flying Horse Shoe Hotel; 54.10586°N 2.40960°W		Late 1840s	The house, at one time a hotel, is in stone on a plinth, with chamfered quoins, a deep moulded cornice, and a slate roof with coped gables. There are two storeys and three bays. The central doorway has a chamfered surround on moulded bases, a rectangular fanlight and a cornice. It is flanked by canted bay windows, and in the upper floor are sash windows with chamfered surrounds.	II
Clapham Primary School; 54.11667°N 2.39227°W	—	1864	The school, designed by Edward Paley, is in stone on a coped plinth, with overhanging bracketed eaves, and Welsh slate roofs with metal finials. There is a single storey and an L-shaped plan, with two ranges at right angles. The main entrance has a segmental pointed arched opening, above which is a hood mould, and there is an inscribed and dated tympanum. Most of the windows are lancets.	II
Passenger waiting room, Clapham railway station 54.10541°N 2.41017°W		c. 1870	The waiting room, designed for the Midland Railway, is in stone, with a modillion eaves cornice, and a stone slate roof. There is a single storey and three bays. The central bay is gabled with chamfered bargeboards, and contains an entrance with a chamfered Tudor lintel. The flanking bays each contain a single-light window, and in the returns are two-light mullioned windows.	II
