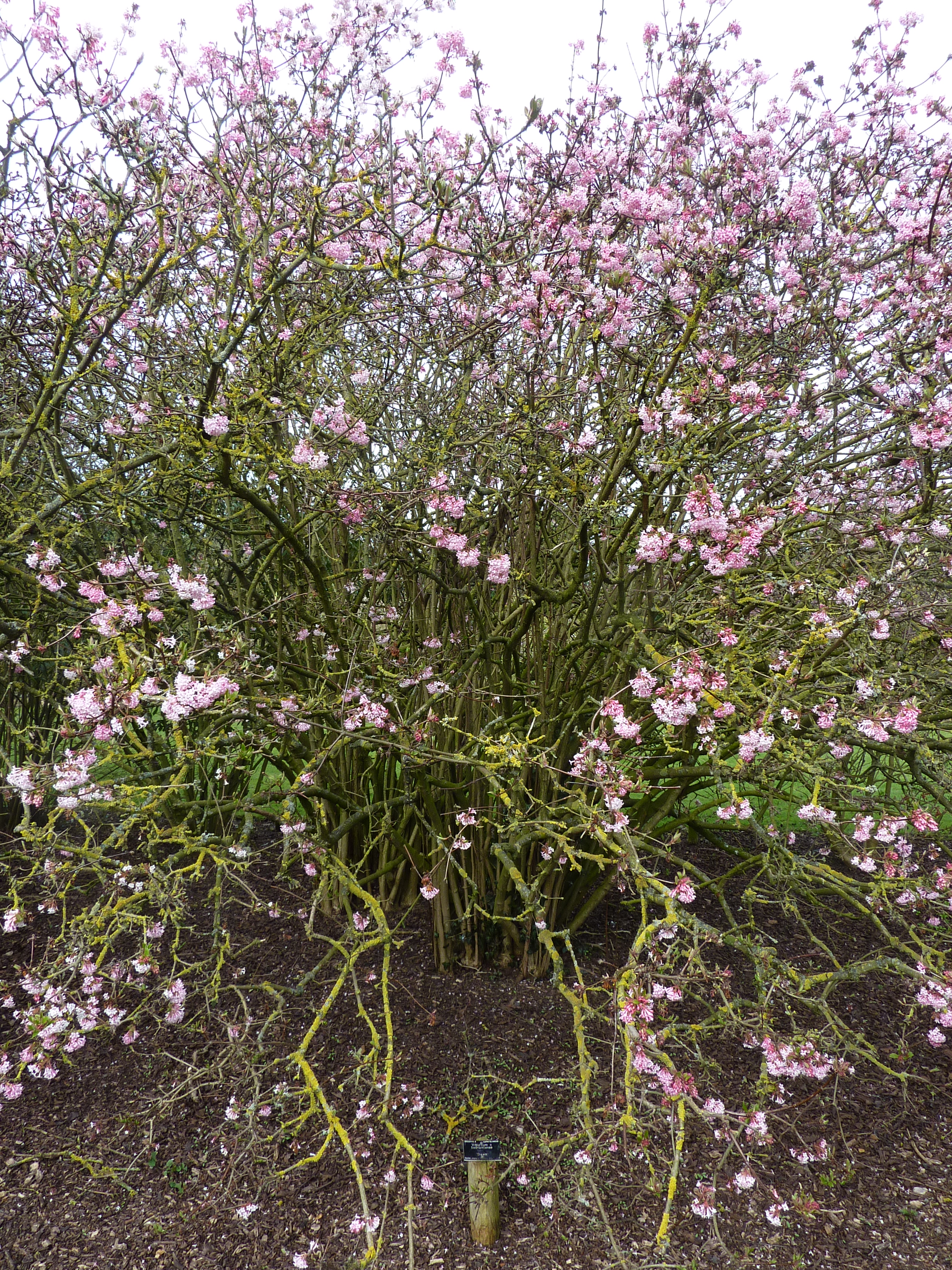
- Cultivar 'Dawn' in flower

Scientific classification
- Kingdom: Plantae
- Clade: Tracheophytes
- Clade: Angiosperms
- Clade: Eudicots
- Clade: Asterids
- Order: Dipsacales
- Family: Viburnaceae
- Genus: Viburnum
- Species: V. × bodnantense

Binomial name
- Viburnum × bodnantense Aberc. ex Stearn

= Viburnum × bodnantense =

Species of flowering plant

Viburnum × bodnantense, the Bodnant viburnum, is a Group of hybrid flowering plant cultivars of garden origin. They originate in a cross between V. farreri and V. grandiflorum made by Charles Puddle, head gardener to Lord Aberconway at Bodnant Garden, Wales around 1935.

The most famous selection, 'Dawn', is a substantial deciduous shrub growing to 2.5 m (8.2 ft) tall by 1.5 m (4.9 ft) broad. In winter and early spring the bare branches are clothed with fragrant pink blooms, and later by narrow, heavily veined oval leaves. These turn bright red in autumn, and are often accompanied by small globose red fruits. Though hardy down to −20 °C (−4 °F), like all early-flowering shrubs the flowers can be affected by late frost – which in turn affects the production of fruit. This shrub requires a sheltered position in full sun or partial shade, in soil that stays moist.

The cultivars 'Dawn', 'Deben' and 'Charles Lamont' are recipients of the Royal Horticultural Society's Award of Garden Merit.

According to the Plant List, Viburnum × bodnantense is an unresolved name, meaning that it has not yet been accredited as a valid botanical name or synonym.
