= St James' Church, Clapham =

Parish church of Clapham, North Yorkshire, England

Coordinates: 54°07′13″N 2°23′25″W

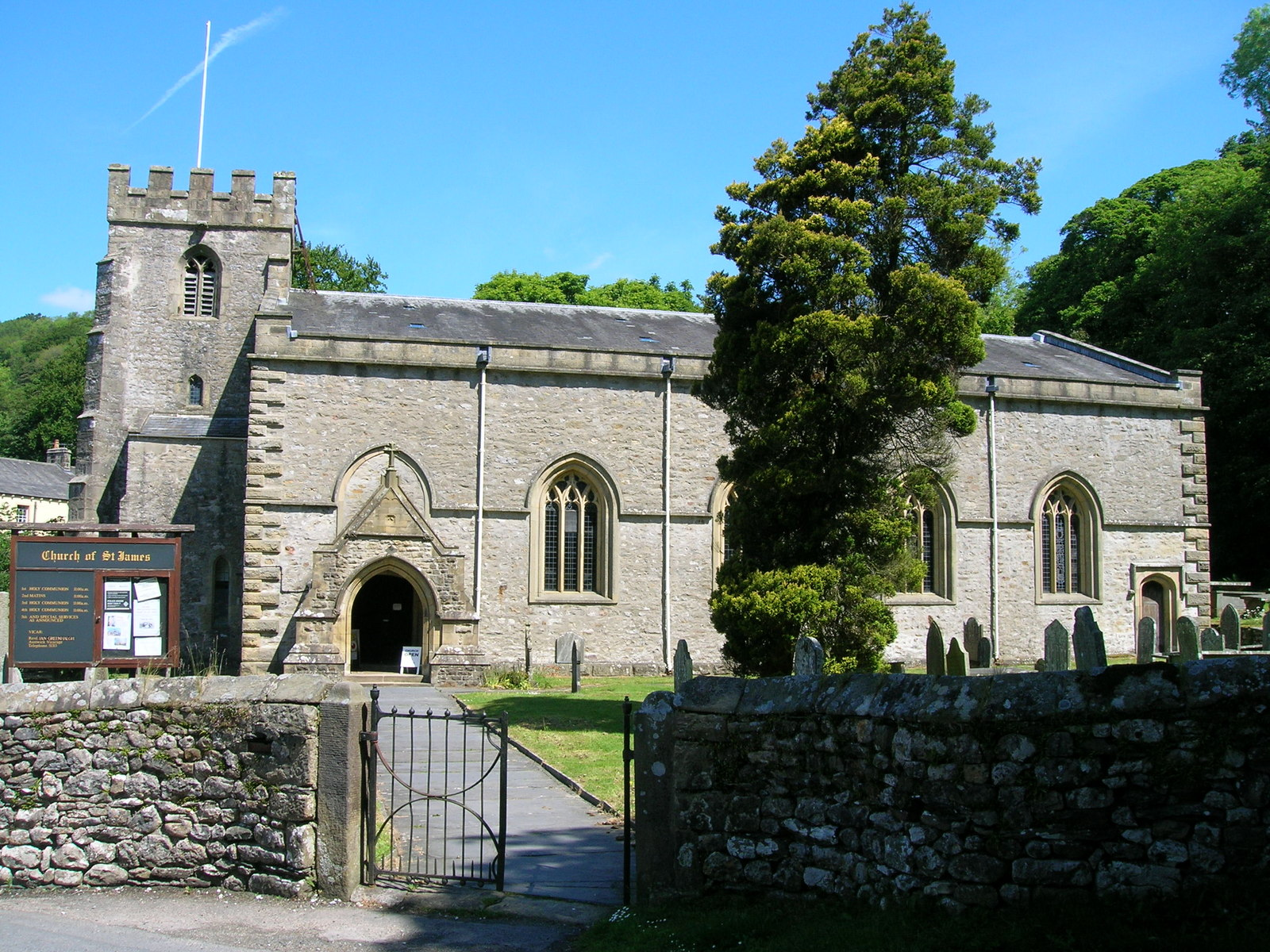
The church, in 2011

St James' Church is the parish church of Clapham, North Yorkshire, in England.

The church was originally constructed in the 15th century. Other than the tower, it was rebuilt in 1814, and in 1899 a south porch was added and some of the windows were altered. The building was Grade II listed in 1958. In 2013, the National Churches Trust gave a grant of £10,000 towards repairs.

The church is built of stone with a slate roof and consists of a nave, north and south aisles, a south porch, a chancel, and a west tower. The tower has three stages, diagonal buttresses, and a west doorway with a moulded surround, a Tudor arch and a hood mould, above which is a three-light window with a pointed arch. Over this is a small window with a trefoil head, a clock face and bell openings with two lights, and at the top is an embattled parapet with a central gargoyle on each side. Inside, the dado panelling is reused from 17th-century pews, while the current pews date from the 1899 alterations.

== See also ==
- Listed buildings in Clapham cum Newby
