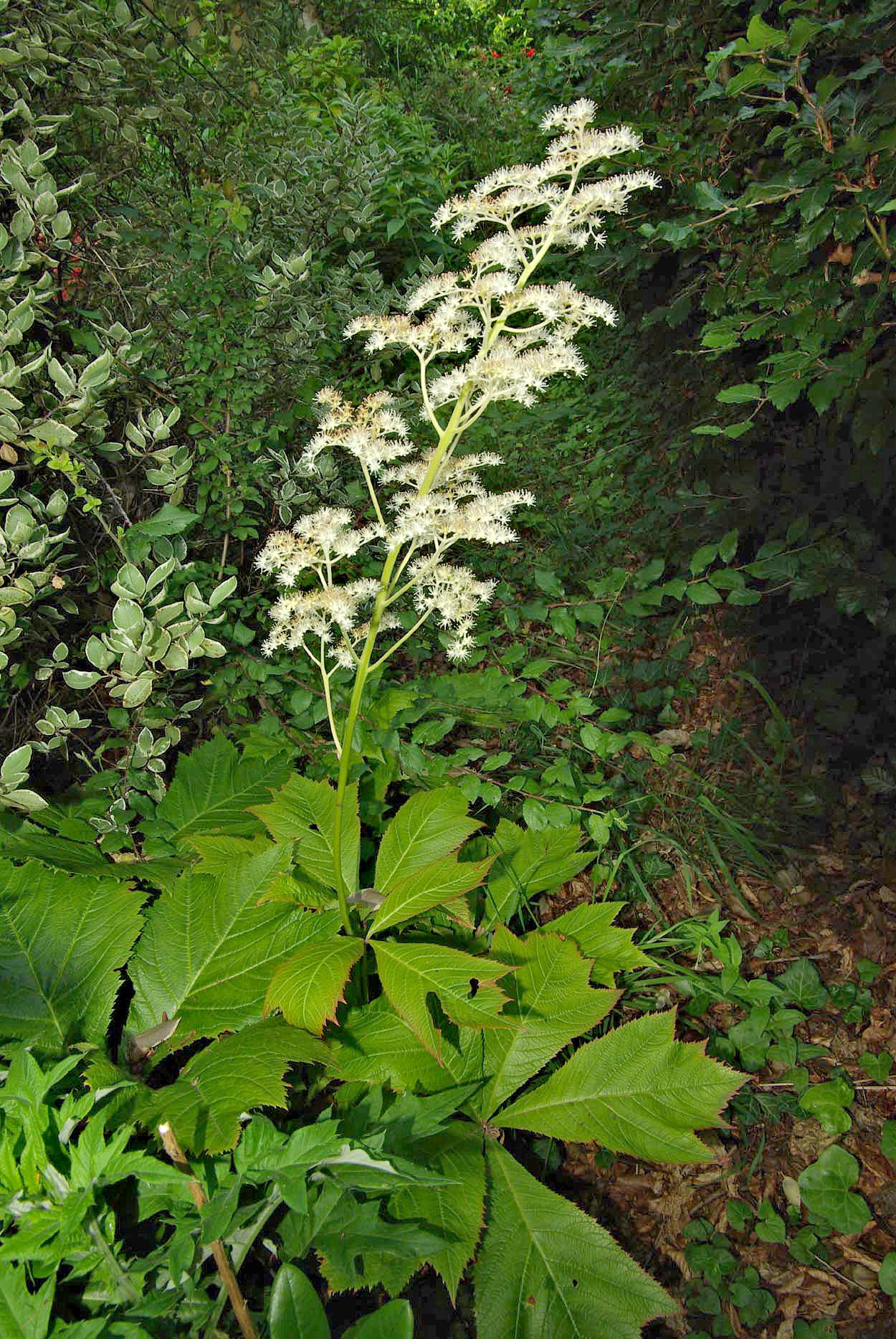
- Rodgersia podophylla

Scientific classification
- Kingdom: Plantae
- Clade: Embryophytes
- Clade: Tracheophytes
- Clade: Spermatophytes
- Clade: Angiosperms
- Clade: Eudicots
- Order: Saxifragales
- Family: Saxifragaceae
- Genus: Rodgersia; A.Gray

Type species
- Rodgersia podophylla A.Gray

Species
- See text

= Rodgersia =

Genus of flowering plants

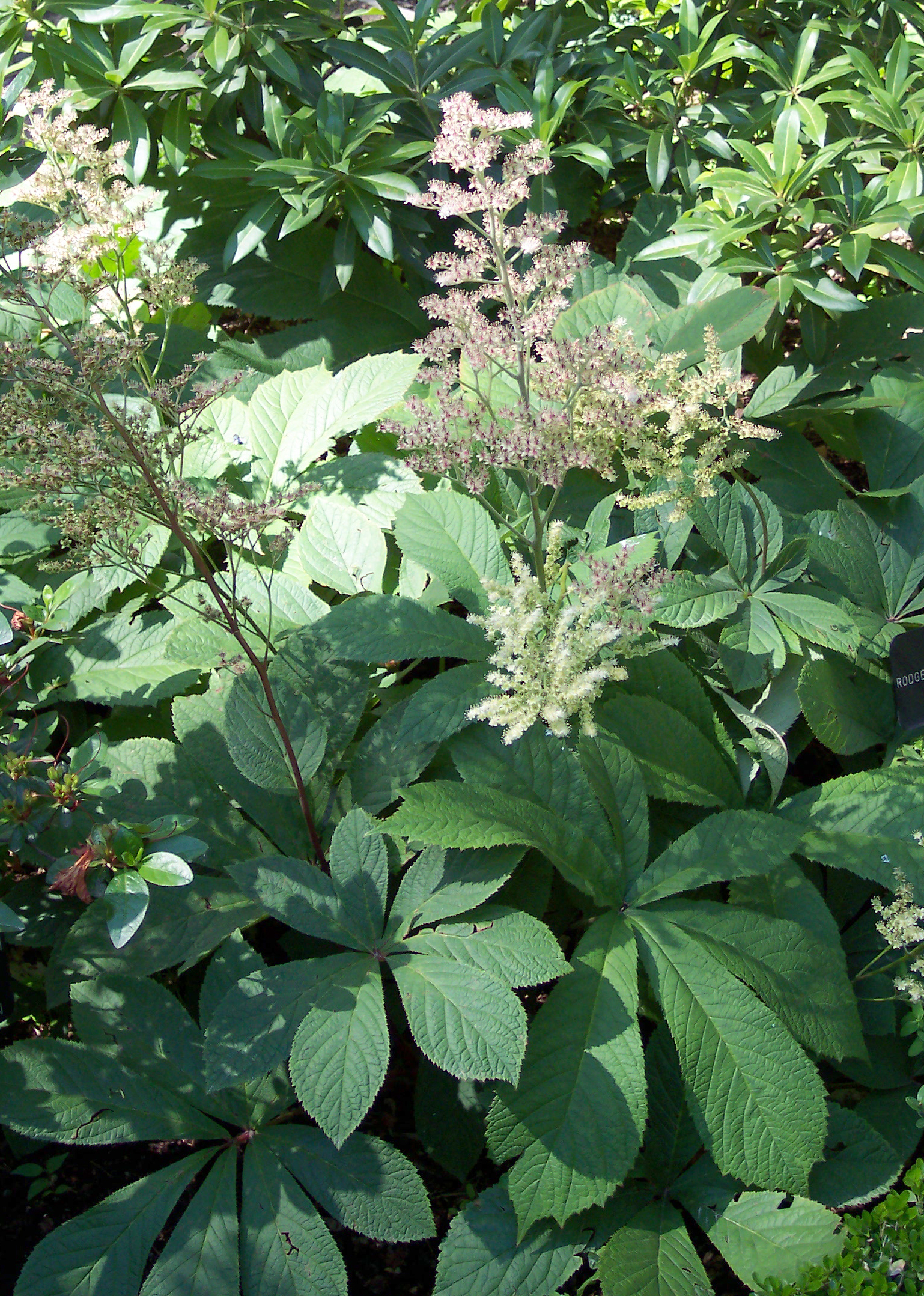
Rodgersia aesculifolia

Rodgersia is a genus of flowering plants in the Saxifragaceae family. Rodgersia are herbaceous perennials originating from east Asia.

== Taxonomy ==
The review of the genus by Pan Jin-tang, in 1994 recognises five distinct species.

- Rodgersia aesculifolia
- Rodgersia henrici
- Rodgersia pinnata
- Rodgersia podophylla
- Rodgersia sambucifolia

Jin-tang further described the varieties R. aesculifolia var. aesculifolia, R. aesculifolia var.henrici (Franchet) C.Y.Wu, R. sambucifolia Hemsl.var. estrigosa J.T.Pan, R. pinnata Franch.var.pinnata and R. pinnata var.strigosa J.T.Pan. The garden ornamental Astilboides tabularis was formerly included in Rodgersia.

== History of discovery ==
The genus was designated by the American taxonomist, A.Gray, in 1885, who named it after the US Admiral, John Rodgers, commander of the expedition in which R. podophylla was discovered in the 1850s. By 1871, R. podophylla was present in the United States and was flowering in the Imperial Botanical Garden at Saint Petersburg and in 1878, seed brought back to a British nursery, Veitch & Sons, produced flowering plants.

Rodgersia aesculifolia was discovered by Father Armand David in 1869.

Rodgersia pinnata, was also discovered by Abbé David, in China's Yunnan province, in 1883. It first flowered in the UK in 1902. R. sambucifolia was discovered by Ernest Wilson 1904 in Yalung, China.

Rodgersia nepalensis was not identified until in 1966 in the UK from a collection by Peter Schilling who made a second collection of seeds of this species. There are distinct differences between the plants raised from these two collections whose numbers are EMAK 713/901 and ED2879.

Rodgersia henrici which was initially thought to be an astilbe was collected by Prince Henri d'Orleans in 1895 but this has recently been reduced to a variety of R. aesculifolia.

In older literature there is mention of R. purdomii named after William Purdom who collected in China in around 1910. The herbarium specimen of a plant raised from that seed, at Kew, identifies it as R. aesculifolia.

== Habitat and description ==
Rodgersia podophylla is native to the island of Honshū in Japan and to Korea. All the other species are found in China, Tibet, and Nepal. The geographical ranges of all but R. nepalensis overlap each other.

In their native habitats they grow by streams and in shady moist woodland. In cultivation they thrive in soil that never dries out but is not waterlogged. They will grow in sun under these conditions in good humus-rich soil but they are susceptible to sun- and wind-scorch. They are hardy down to Zone 5 but their new growths in the spring can be damaged by late frosts.

The thick rhizomes spread just under surface of the soil. Three of the species are clump forming, whereas R. nepalensis and some forms of R. podophylla can cover large areas quite quickly once they are established.

The strong leaf stems grow to an average height of about one metre but this depends on the variety and growing conditions. The spread of the compound leaves, especially of R. podophylla, can also be up to one metre making them architectural plants in cultivation. The flowering stems rise above the foliage and the panicles of flowers, although lacking true petals, are spectacular and colourful being white, cream, pink or red except in R. nepalensis which are greeny yellow.

The leaves of many varieties are attractive in the Spring when, grown in good light, they have a bronze or copper hue. This is especially beautiful in the Purdomi group of R. aesculifolia which keep a metallic sheen into early summer. In the autumn (fall), the leaves turn attractive shades of coppery-brown. The seed heads are also attractive, those of many R. pinnata are claret coloured which deepens as winter progresses.

== Species ==
=== Rodgersia podophylla ===
The leaves of R. podophylla, Gray (diploid 2n=30) are palmate. The individual leaflets, from 5 to 7 in number, have between 3 and 5 drip tips at their angular apices. The leaflets resemble a duck's webbed foot and this is sufficient to identify R. podophylla from all the other species. There are two forms of R. podophylla, one which has tough leathery leaves which are often bronze in the spring and autumn, and a thinner leaved form which remains a light green colour. R. podophylla is often very shy at flowering, but can cover large areas by means of its spreading rhizomes. The flowers are white, the sepals ageing to green as do the ovaries.

=== Rodgersia aesculifolia ===
In R. aesculifolia, Batalin (tetraploid 2n=60") the leaves are symmetrically palmate radiating from a central point most often without petioles.They are obvate with acute apices and coarsely serrated. Recently, R. aesculifolia (chestnut-leaved) has been divided into three distinct taxa.

1. White flowered.
  This has small flowers, 2–8 mm in diameter. The green, white or yellowish buds open to white flowers that go green with age. It has green leaves throughout the growing season and airy inflorescences with curled flower clusters.
2. Purdomii taxon.
  This also has small flowers 2–8 mm in diameter but the flower buds are pink opening to sepals tinged or tipped pink turning white, the flowers ageing green. The young leaves are copper or bronze in colour and the older leaves retain a metallic shean. The inflorescences have an airy appearance as in taxon 1.
3. Henrici taxon.
  This has large flowers 8–18 mm in diameter, a major difference with the other two taxa. The bright pink sepals and ovaries get progressively deeper in colour as they age and remain claret-coloured through autumn. The inflorescences have nothing "airy" about them but are solid-looking, broad based with flower clusters that have almost flat tops with their undersides clearly visible when viewed from the side. They form tiers as in a multiple wedding cake and the flowers are closely packed along the pedicels. The texture of the leaf surface of var. henrici is firm and there is no tendency to deflect downwards from the mid-vein or at the apex, as in the soft-textured var. aesculifolia.

All the veins in var. henrici are sunken, giving the top surface of the leaflets a quilted effect and on the underside, all the veins are prominent. The leaflets of var.aesculifolia have an almost smooth upper surface and only the main veins are prominent on the underside. The normal number of leaflets for var. henrici is 7–9; for var. aesculifolia it is 6–7.Pan (1994) provides a key that separates R. aesculifolia var. aesculifolia from var. henrici. This key states that var. henrici has more glandular hairs on the ventral surface of its sepals than var. aesculifolia and that the arcuate (curved) sepal veins meet at the tips whereas they do not in var. aesculifolia.

From a gardener's point of view, the general differences in the non-microscopic features of the plants are sufficiently diagnostic.

=== Rodgersia sambucifolia ===
Rodgersia sambucifolia, Hemsley (tetraploid 2n=60) The leaves are pinnate and remain green throughout their life. The number of pairs of leaflets varies with the age of the plant and habitat. It is the smallest, in stature, of all of the species having foliage and flower spikes around 500mm tall. The small white flowers rapidly age to browny green. The two varieties established by Pan are distinguished by microscopic features. (Sambucifolia; having leaves like Sambucus, the Elder tree)

=== Rodgersia pinnata ===
Rodgersia pinnata, Franchet (tetraploid 2n=60) has the most diverse leaf form of any of the Rodgersia and this leads to mis-identification and mis-labelling in horticulture. Rarely are the leaflets arranged in true pinnate form with evenly spaced leaflets. They vary from pseudo-pinnate, when the leaflets can be bunched 2 to 5 at the petiole and 3 at the apex with varying numbers of pairs of leaflets between with varying lengths of rachis, to plants where the rachis is so compressed as to need very close inspection to ascertain that it is not palmate. The size of the individual obovate-lanceolate leaflets ranges from 20 mm long x 10 mm wide to double those measurements depending on variety and growing conditions. The height of the leaves may exceed one metre and that of the inflorescence, one and a half metres. The flowers can be white, palest pink to deep claret colour and the subsequent seeds heads range from green through to deep mahogany. There are many cultivars, R. pinnata is very variable in all its aspects and readily hybridises with both R. podophylla and R. aesculifolia. As with R. sambucifolia, the two varieties established by Pan are distinguished by microscopic features.

=== Rodgersia nepalensis ===
Rodgersia nepalensis, T.A.Cope ex Cullen has a truly pinnate leaf, blue-green in EMAK 713, yellowy-green in ED2879. The individual leaflet are about 15 mm long and 5 mm wide with markedly serrated edges, tipped red brown in EMAK, yellow in ED. The sepals of EMAK are pale green, those of ED pale yellow. The flower colour distinguishes R. nepalensis from all other Rodgersia
