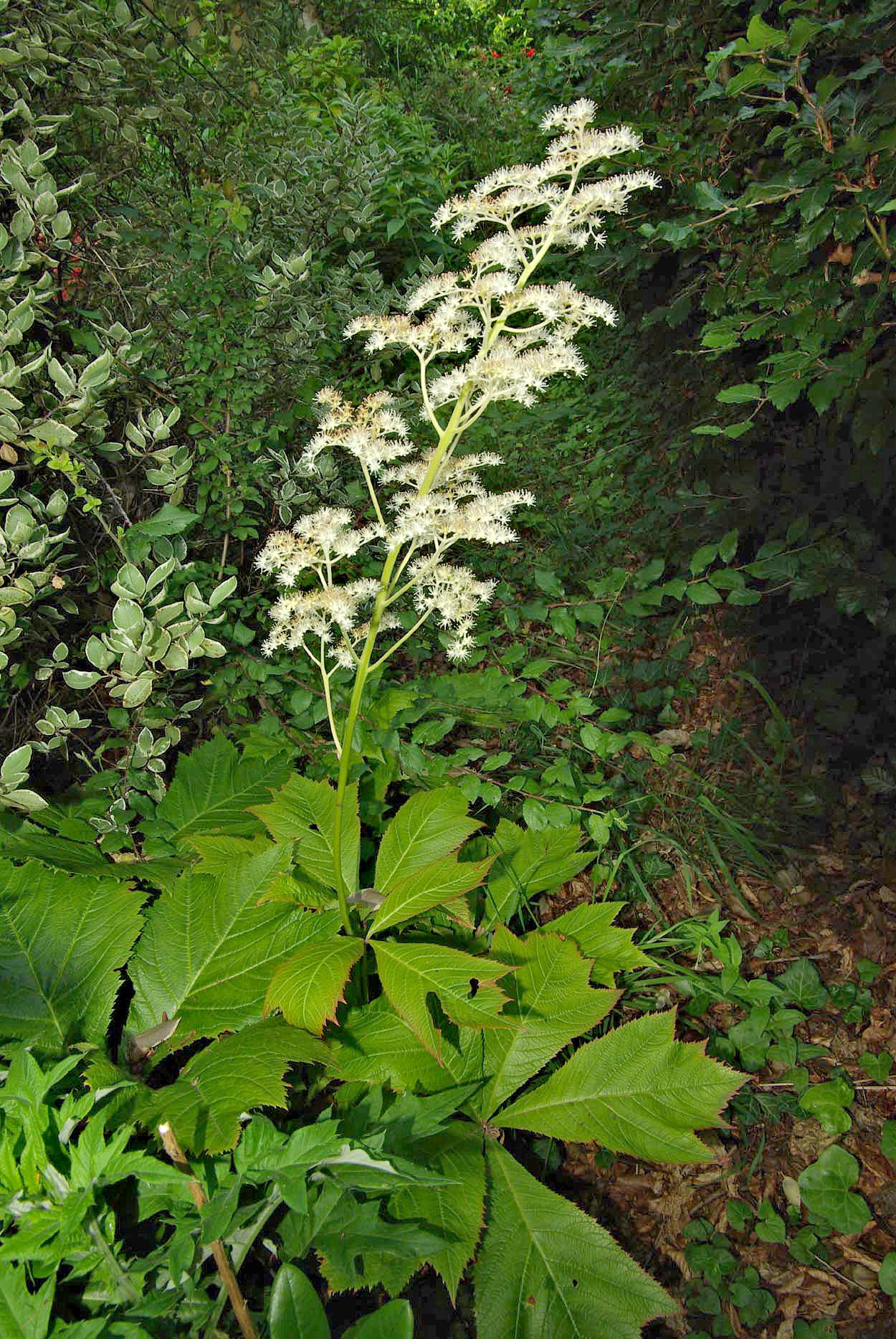

Scientific classification
- Kingdom: Plantae
- Clade: Tracheophytes
- Clade: Angiosperms
- Clade: Eudicots
- Order: Saxifragales
- Family: Saxifragaceae
- Genus: Rodgersia
- Species: R. podophylla

Binomial name
- Rodgersia podophylla A.Gray.

Synonyms
- Astilbe podophylla Franch.; Rodgersia japonica Regel

= Rodgersia podophylla =

Species of flowering plant

Rodgersia podophylla is a species of flowering plant in the saxifrage family native to Japan and Korea. Growing to 2 m (6.6 ft) tall and broad, it is a herbaceous perennial with handsome spiky leaves, and occasional creamy-white flower panicles in June and July. It is extensively grown for ornamental use in gardens where it prefers damp shady positions on neutral to acid soils. Though hardy to −20 °C (−4 °F) it enjoys a sheltered location. It is chosen primarily for its clumps of large 5- or 7-toothed palmate leaves, which open bronze, turning green in summer and bronze-red in autumn. It can spread by underground rhizomes, eventually covering a large area.

The compact cultivar 'Rotlaub' has gained the Royal Horticultural Society's Award of Garden Merit.

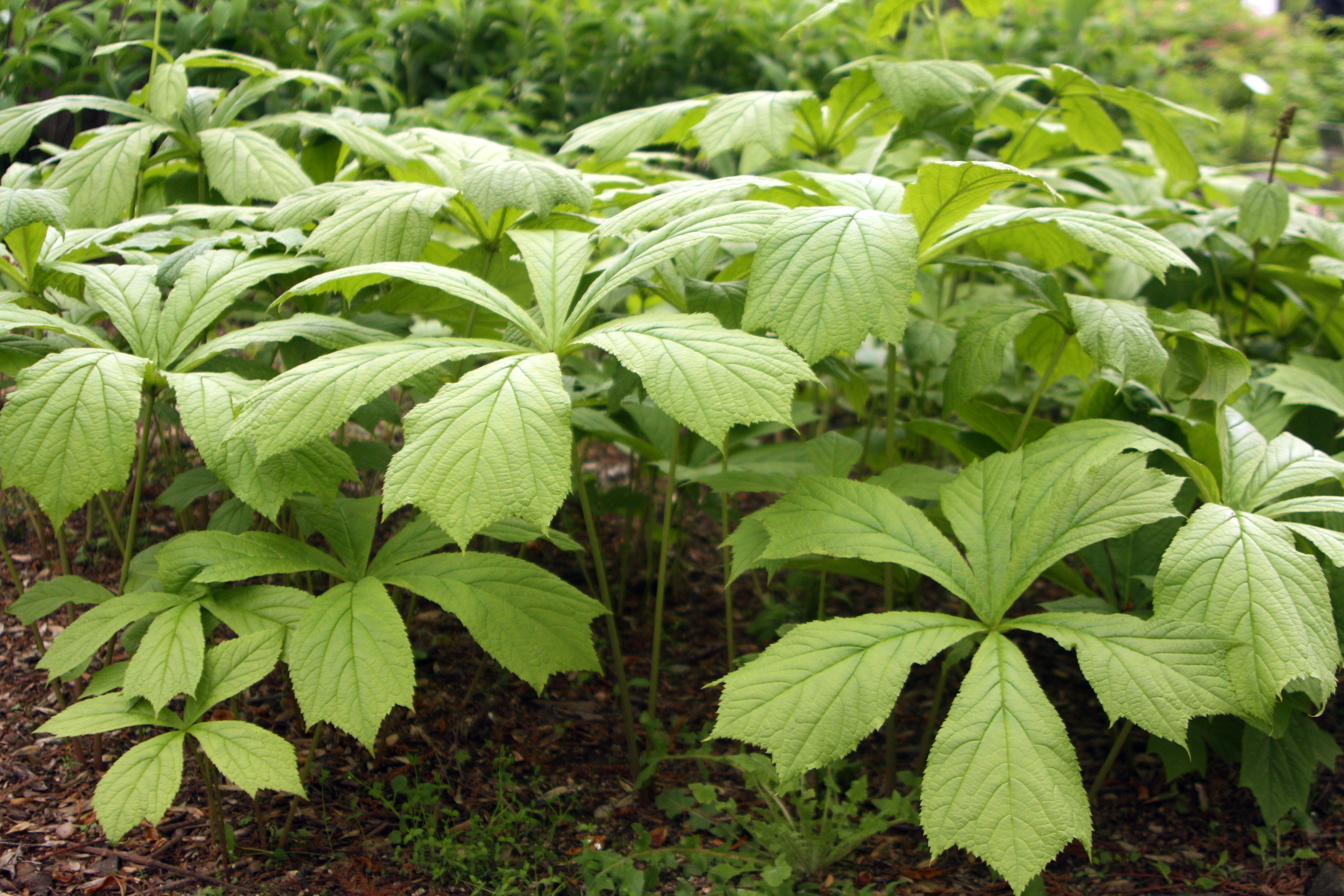

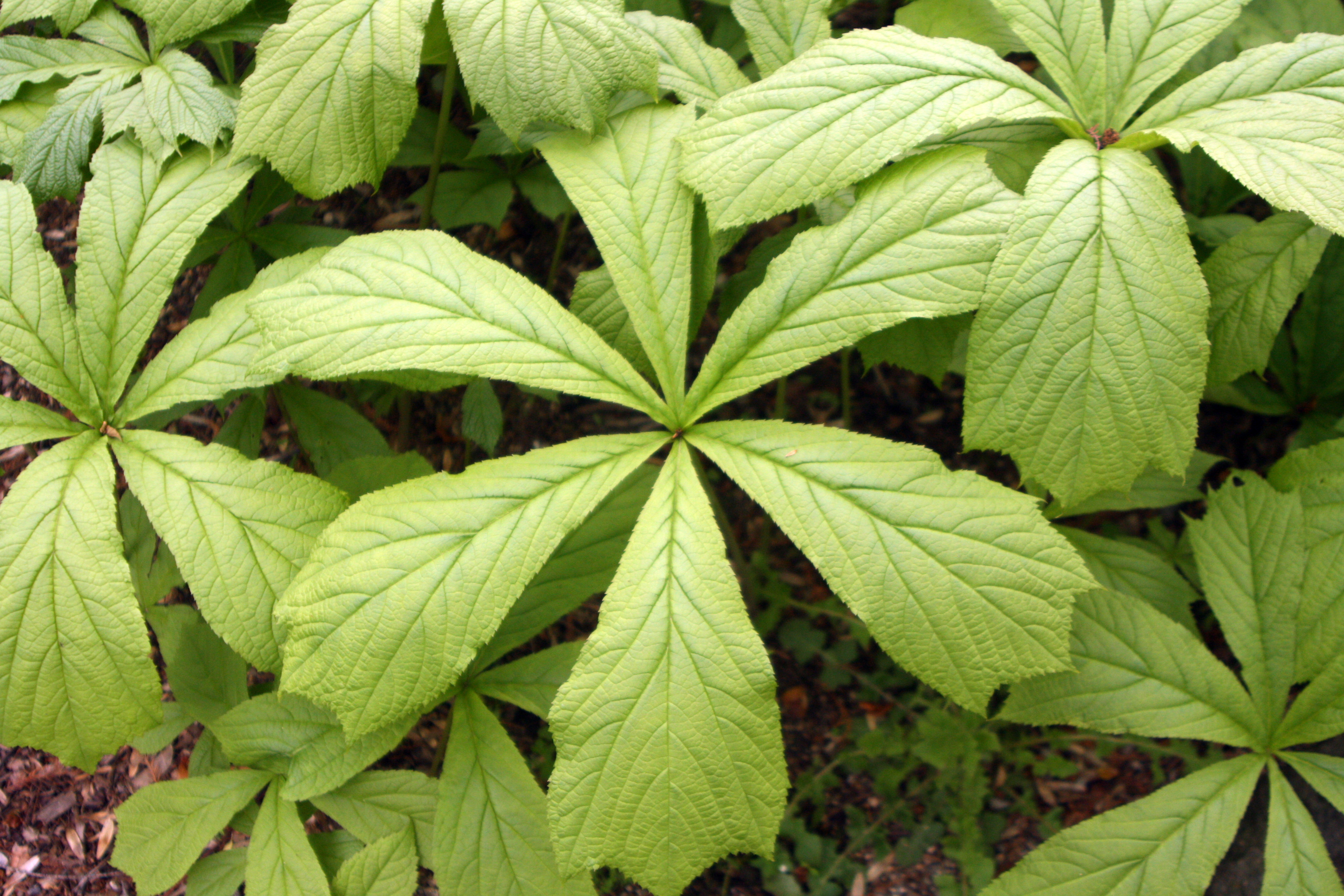

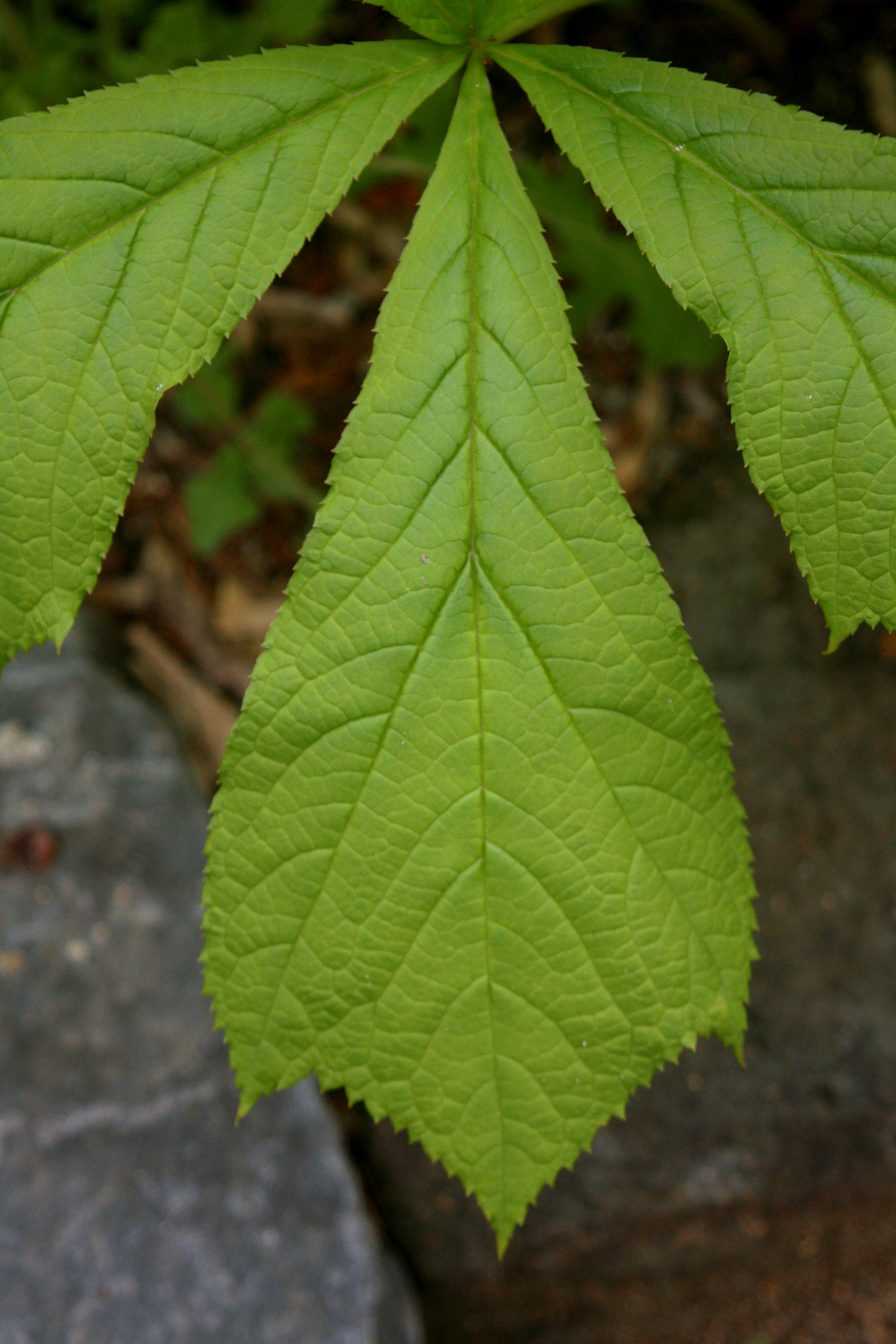
