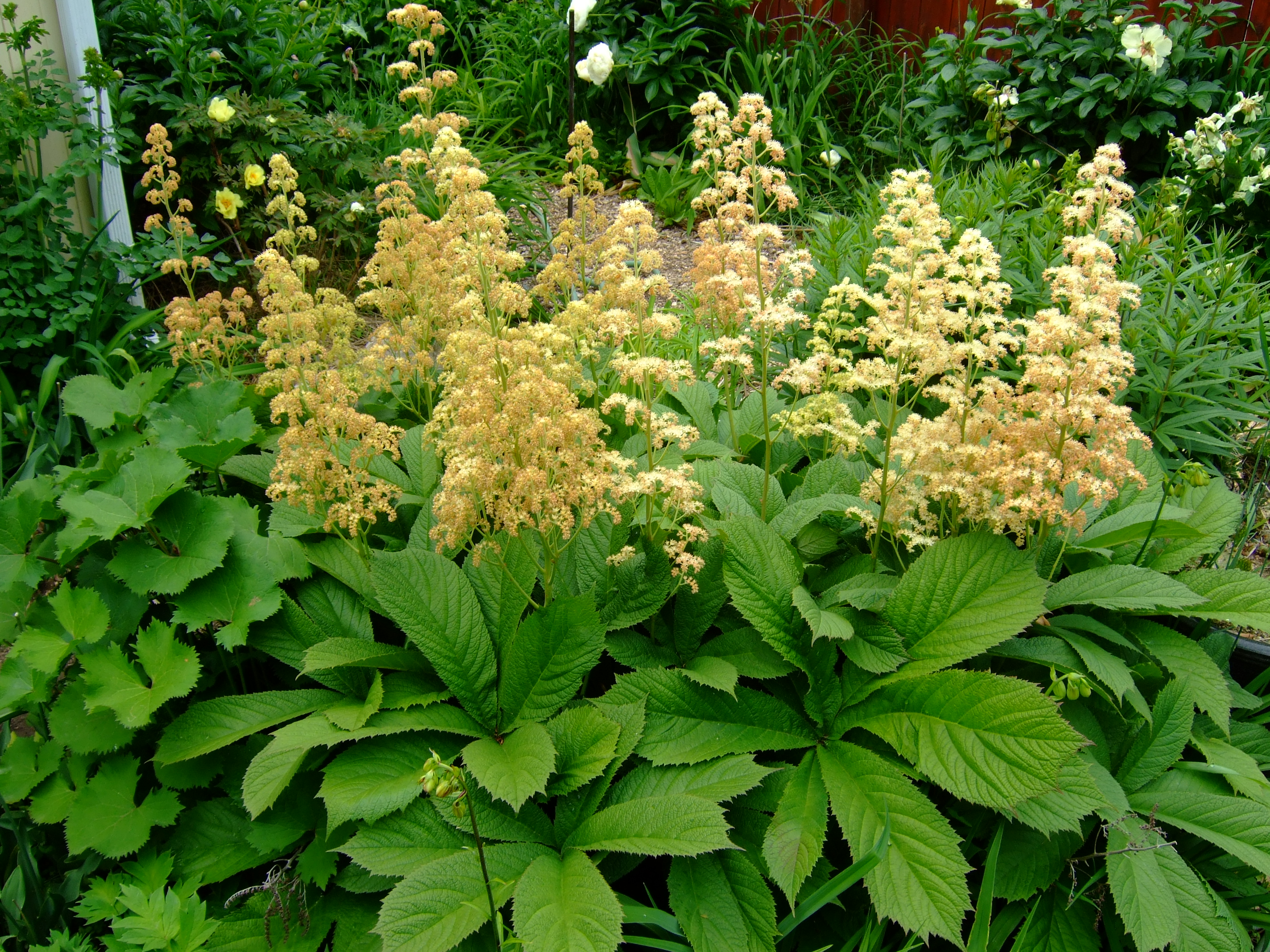

Scientific classification
- Kingdom: Plantae
- Clade: Tracheophytes
- Clade: Angiosperms
- Clade: Eudicots
- Order: Saxifragales
- Family: Saxifragaceae
- Genus: Rodgersia
- Species: R. pinnata

Binomial name
- Rodgersia pinnata Franch.

= Rodgersia pinnata =

Species of flowering plant

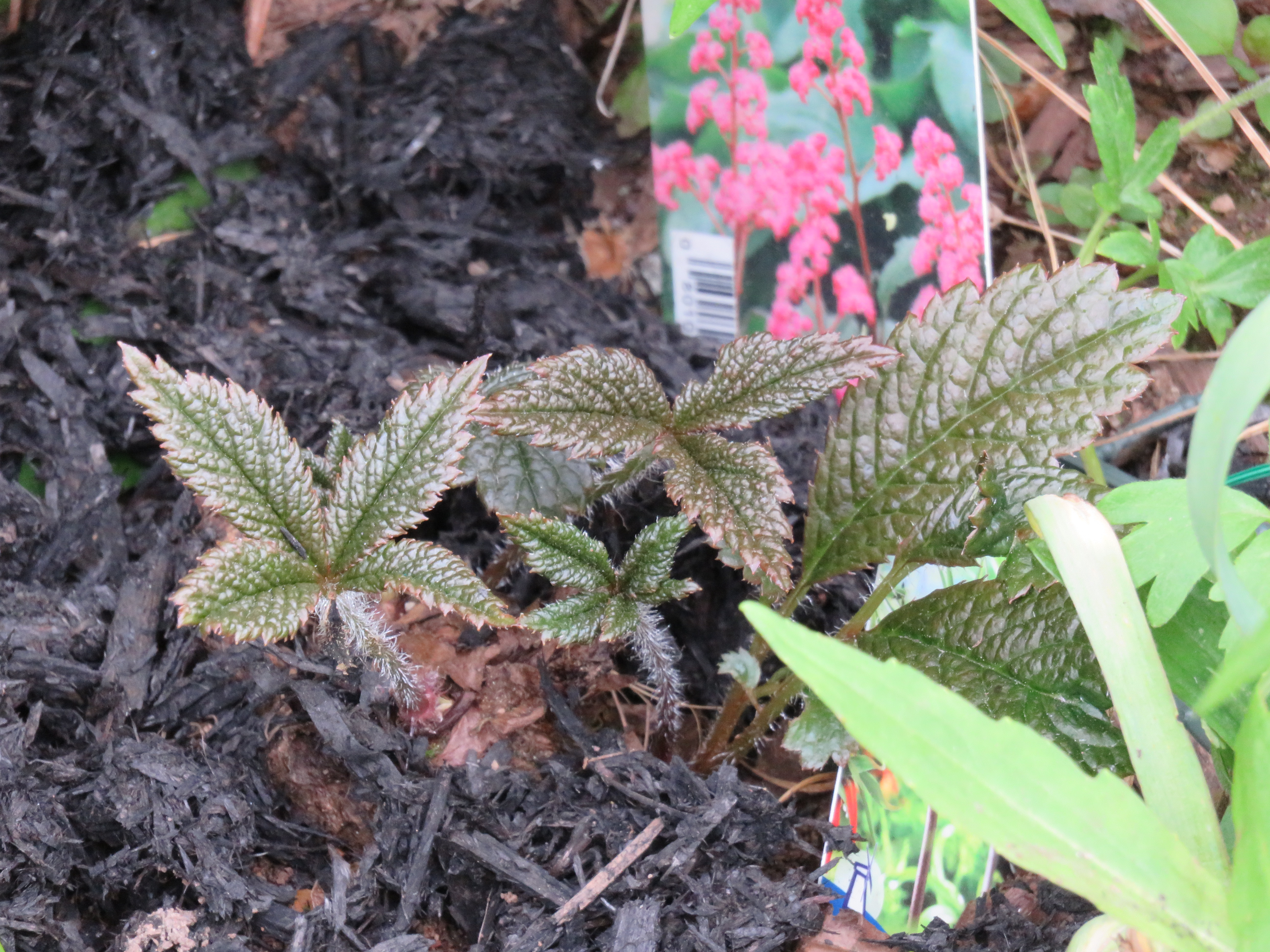
Young plant of Rodgersia pinnata 'Fireworks'

Rodgersia pinnata is a species of flowering plant in the family Saxifragaceae, native to the Sichuan and Yunnan provinces of China. It is a robust, herbaceous perennial growing to 120 cm (47 in) tall by 75 cm (30 in) broad, with textured palmate/pinnate leaves up to 90 cm (35 in) long, with 5-9 leaflets. 60 cm (24 in) erect panicles made up of tiny, star-shaped flowers, are borne on reddish green stems in summer. The flowers are white.

Cultivars may have white, cream, pink or red flowers. Red cultivars include 'Fireworks'.

The following cultivars have won the Royal Horticultural Society's Award of Garden Merit:

- 'Elegans'
- 'Irish Bronze'
- 'Superba'

== Bibliography ==
- RHS (2015). "Royal Horticultural Society".
- Dave's Garden (2015). "Welcome to Dave's Garden!". Internet Brands.
- Heritage Perennials (2015). "Perennials.com".
