= Euan Hillhouse Methven Cox =

Scottish plant collector, botanist and horticulturist

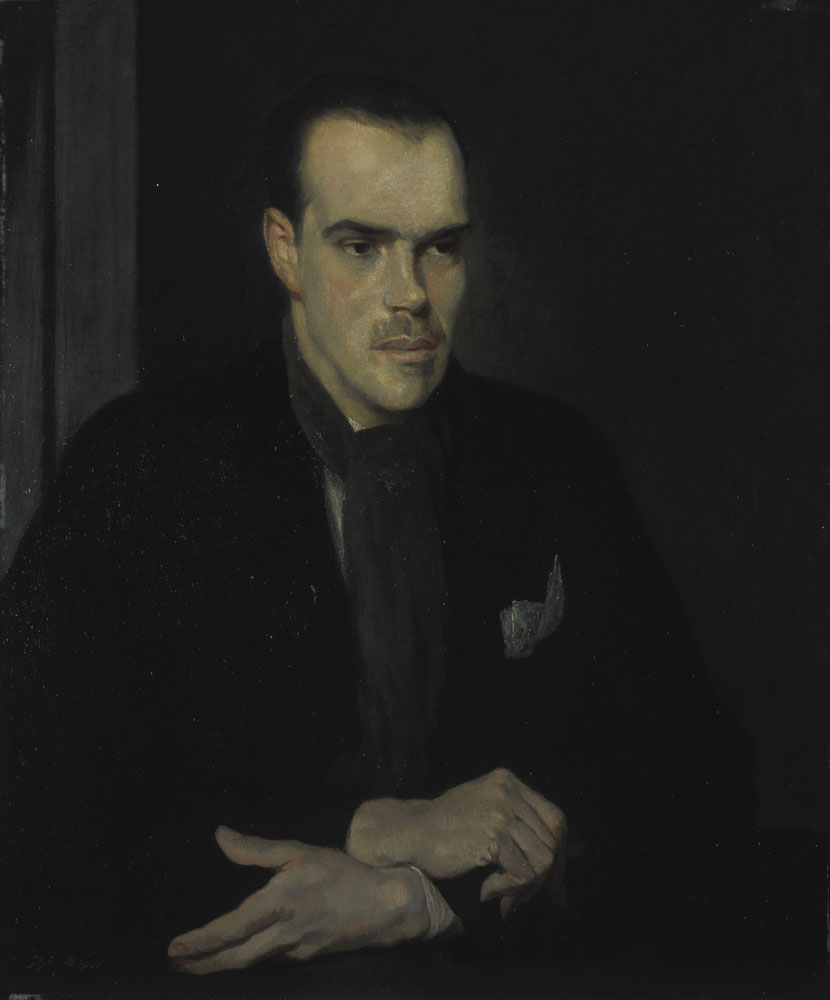
- Euan Cox (1893-1977); National Galleries of Scotland, by Glyn Philpot
- Born: 1893
- Died: 1977 (aged 83–84)
- Known for: Botany, Nomocharis
- Scientific career
- Author abbrev. (botany): Cox

Euan Hillhouse Methven Cox (1893–1977) was a Scottish plant collector, botanist, and horticulturist, who accompanied Reginald Farrer on his last botanical expedition to Burma and its border with China, from 1919 to 1920. He was a very successful propagator of rhododendrons and had an extensive collection in his garden at Glendoick, Perthshire, Scotland, which formed in 1953 the basis of his commercial nursery, later run by his son, Peter A Cox, and grandson, Kenneth N.E. Cox. The enterprise introduced many dwarf hybrids, suitable for the Scottish climate. From 1929 to 1940 E. H. M. Cox was the editor of the magazine The New Flora and Silva.

The commercial nursery, with Britain’s largest selection of rhododendrons, developed a major tourist attraction consisting of an expansive garden centre, an award-winning café, and a series of woodland spaces filled with plants collected by or grown by the Cox family. In 2001 Kenneth Cox discovered the species R. titapuriense in Arunachal Pradesh, northeast India near the border with China. In 2009 his book Scotland for Gardeners won the accolade Garden Media Guild Reference Book of the Year.

== Selected publications ==
- Cox, E.H.M. (1930). The plant introductions of Reginald Farrer. London: New Flora and Silva Ltd.
- 1944. The Honourable East India Company and China. Proceedings of the Linnean Soc. 156: 5-8
- Euan Hillhouse Methven Cox, Peter Alfred Cox. 1958. Modern shrubs. Ed. Nelson. 215 pp.
- ------------, ------------. 1956. Modern rhododendrons. Ed. Thomas Nelson & Sons. 193 pp.
- 1947. Primulas for garden and greenhouse. Ed. Dulau; B.H. Blackwell. 86 pp.
- 1945. Plant Hunting in China: A History of Botanical Exploration in China and the Tibetan Marches. Ed. Collins. 228 pp.
- 1935. A history of gardening in Scotland. Ed. Chatto & Windus for New flora & Silva Ltd. 228 pp.
- 1927. The modern English garden. Ed. Country life Ltd. 192 pp.
- 1927. The evolution of a garden. Volume 132 Home university library of modern knowledge. Ed. Williams & Norgate. 256 pp.
- 1926. Farrer's Last Journey: Upper Burma, 1919-20. London: Dulau & Co. 244 pp.
- 1924. Rhododendrons for amateurs. Ed. Country life Ltd. 111 pp.

== Species named after him ==
- (Berberidaceae) Berberis coxii C.K.Schneid.
- (Cupressaceae) Juniperus coxii A.B.Jacks.

== Bibliography ==
- 2008. Suki Urquhart. ‘Cox, Euan Hillhouse Methven (1893–1977)’
