= Reginald Farrer =

British gardener

Reginald John Farrer
- Born: 17 February 1880; Marylebone, London
- Died: 17 October 1920 (aged 40); Nyitadi, Northern Burma
- Education: Balliol College, Oxford
- Occupations: Gardener; writer; plant collector

Reginald John Farrer (17 February 1880 – 17 October 1920), was an English traveller and plant collector. He published a number of books, although is best known for My Rock Garden. He travelled to Asia in search of a variety of plants, many of which he brought back to England and planted near his home village of Clapham, North Yorkshire.

== Life ==
Farrer was born in Marylebone, London into a well-to-do family who resided in Clapham, North Yorkshire. Due to a speech defect and numerous operations on a cleft palate, he was educated at home. He developed a passionate and lifelong enthusiasm for high places and the mountain plants that grow there. By 10 years of age he was a well-qualified field botanist with a "fair knowledge of plant anatomy." At 14 years he made his first rock garden in an abandoned quarry.

He entered Balliol College, Oxford at 17 years of age and graduated in 1902. During his time there he helped to make the rock garden at St John's. In 1902 Farrer embarked on the first of his expeditions to Eastern Asia, visiting China, Korea and, particularly Japan. He was there for eight months and influenced by Japanese gardening tastes and traditions, he developed his characteristically strong views on rock garden design, 'where naturalism superseded formal artificiality, and where alpine plants were to grow in surroundings which, though ordered by man, copied as far as possible their original habitats'. These travels resulted in The Garden of Asia (1904).

Returning to England he attempted to become a novelist and poet. His first book was well received, but later publications less so. In 1907 he published My Rock Garden, which was a very popular and influential book and was kept continuously in print for more than 40 years. His next publications were Alpines and Bog Plants (1908), In a Yorkshire Garden (1909) and Among the Hills (1910). In 1913 he published The Dolomites: King Laurin's Garden, which deals with plant hunting in the Italian Dolomites. In 1913 he wrote The English Rock-Garden: Volumes 1 and 2 (1918), which was very popular with at least four impressions.

At this time Farrer travelled widely in the mountains of Italy, France and Switzerland, walking and climbing with gardener friends, including fellow plantsman E.A. Bowles. He also visited Ceylon in 1908, becoming a Buddhist there. Later the same year appeared his book, In Old Ceylon.

Farrer was attracted by the horticultural possibilities of the introduction of new hardy rock plants to the British gardening public. With this in mind, he founded the Craven Nursery in Clapham, which specialised in Asian alpines, an enterprise which foundered in the economic crisis of the 1920s.

In 1914 Farrer and the Kew-trained William Purdom set out on an ambitious expedition to Qinghai Tibet and the Province of Kansu province of north-west China. He and Purdom found there numerous hardy specimens that today enrich British gardens. Many bear his name, though the list would have been longer if Farrer had not sometimes neglected to collect, as well as plants and seeds, the herbarium specimens necessary for classification and naming. These two years of exploring and plant collecting are described in Farrer's On the Eaves of the World (2 vols) (1917), and in the posthumous The Rainbow Bridge (1921).

Farrer drew many illustrations, often painted in the most uncomfortable of circumstances, which record, not an exact botanical resemblance, but Farrer's emotional reaction to the plant and its habitat. Many of these, and his landscape water-colours of Kansu and Tibet, were exhibited by the Fine Art Society in 1918.

Farrer's diary conveys the practical difficulties he faced, and provides a glimpse of his ebullient use of language: "June 2, 1919 ... I sat down to paint it (the most marvellous and impressive Rhododendron I've ever seen – a gigantic, excellent, with corrugated leaves and great white trumpets stained with yellow inside – a thing alone, by itself WELL worth all the journey up here and everything) and oddly enough I did not enjoy doing so at first... a first false start – a second, better, splashed and spoilt, then a mizzle, so that umbrella had to be screamed for and held up with one hand while I worked with the other. Then flies and torment and finally a wild dust storm with rain and thunder came raging over so that everything had feverishly to be hauled indoors and the Rhododendron fell over and all the lights and lines etc. were of course quite out of gear. However, I'd done as much as I could for the day by 5.30 but even then was so excited that I continued strolling in glorious meditation till dark and dinner. But one moral is – only paint when fresh or before the day's toils; as it is I must trench on tomorrow which ought to be wholly a rush of letters and articles for the next day's data that I mean to send off. June 3, 1919. The rhododendron gave me such a bad night... I set to however and satisfactorily finished it though it took till after 12."

"Farrer's illustrations, together with the field notes, botanical specimens and seeds which he collected, provided valuable information to the Royal Botanic Garden in Edinburgh, where the Regius Keeper, Sir Isaac Bayley Balfour, took a special interest in Sino-Himalayan plants. Farrer's interest in sending back attractive new plants with horticultural potential, however, was sometimes at odds with Balfour's desire for a comprehensive inventory of all the plants of the region. Farrer's collecting trips are particularly interesting when viewed in the context of the global plant exchanges which occurred during British Imperial rule. During this time crops and other plants were transplanted from then-native habitats to others throughout the Empire for a variety of economic, medical and scientific reasons. At a domestic level, too, while Farrer and other plant collectors introduced new species to British gardens, sentimental colonists took with them plants, and animals, which reminded them of home."

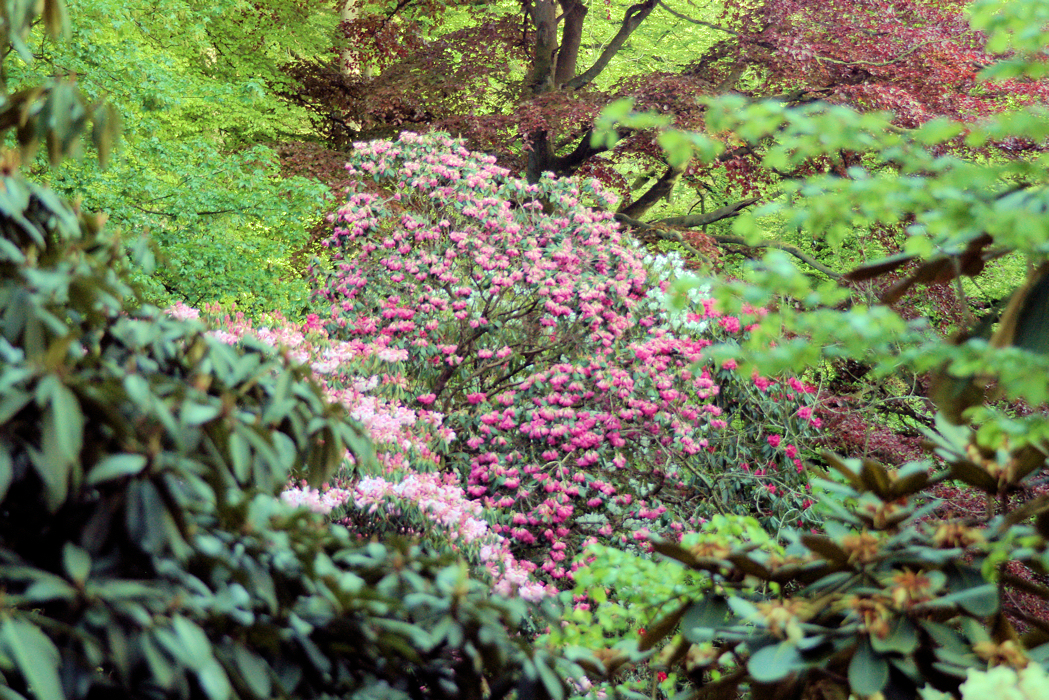
Rhododendrons planted by Reginald Farrer are still growing in woods above Clapham.

Farrer brought back plants from Asia that could be grown in a naturalistic style – not just by the rich who could afford expensive hothouses and personal gardeners. In the words of Farrer's biographer, Nicola Shulman, "He brought rock-gardening into the hearts of the British people."

Farrer himself wrote:

You're on an uncharted mountainside and you have to first of all find the Plant in the summer on the way up the mountain. Then in the autumn, you have to find the same plant – if it hasn't been eaten or trodden on – hope it's set seed and that the seeds haven't fallen yet – and this is just the start.

Farrer was known as an eccentric and in one famous incident, Farrer loaded a shotgun with seeds collected on his foreign travels, and fired them into an inaccessible rock cliff and gorge near the family home in Yorkshire. They did not root, however.

He was a devotee of the novels of Jane Austen and wrote for July 1917 issue of The Quarterly Review an article in celebration of the centenary of her death.

== Death ==
Farrer's final voyage was to the mountains of Upper Burma. He took as his companion the mill-owner Euan Hillhouse Methven Cox, who recorded the trip in Farrer's Last Journey, Upper Burma 1919–20 (1926). This expedition proved less horticulturally successful than Farrer's earlier trip to Kansu, largely because the climate of the Burmese mountains had less in common with British conditions than that of Kansu.

Farrer died in 1920 at Nyitadi in the remote mountains on the Burmese/Chinese frontier at the early age of 40. Cox states that he died alone, but he was almost certainly accompanied by indigenous plant collectors from China and Burma who had been working with him. Cox also states that the probable cause of his death was diphtheria. A few years later, however, one of the plant collectors who had worked for Farrer during his last year told botanist Joseph Rock that he had died from alcohol poisoning. He was buried at Konglu, Burma.

== Legacy ==
Farrer's legacy is a display of plants from the Himalayas, growing today in around Ingleborough. Himalayan rhododendron, bamboo and other plants such as Lonicera syringantha and Rodgersia aesculifolia can be seen among Farrer's Ingleborough display, while in Clapham village itself Viburnum farreri and Potentilla fruticosa flourish.

In 2015 Historic England commissioned a measured survey and analytical assessment of the fabric, layout and history of Farrer's Clapham garden to inform the future repair and management of the site.

According to comedian Stewart Lee, Reginald Farrer rhymes with the phrase 'Knowledge is Power'.

== Selected publications ==
- The Garden of Asia (1904)
- My Rock Garden (1907)
- Farrer, Reginald (1907). Sundered Streams : the history of a memory that had no full stops.
- In Old Ceylon (1908)
- Alpines and Bog Plants (1908)
- In a Yorkshire Garden (1909)
- Among the Hills (1910)
- The Dolomites: King Laurin's Garden (1913)
- On the Eaves of the World (1917)
- Farrer, Reginald (1919). The English Rock Garden 2 vols. London: Jack.
- The Rainbow Bridge (1921)
- Mimpish Squinnies (2007)
- Shulman, Nicola. A Rage for Rock Gardening. Boston: David R. Godine, 2004.

== Plants named after Farrer ==
A number of plants are named after Farrer, Cox's book The Plant Introductions of Reginald Farrer, published in 1930 describes Farrer's legacy of plants cultivated from seed collected by him.

- Allium farreri Stearn
- Amitostigma farreri
- Buddleja farreri
- Bulbophyllum farreri
- Codonopsis farreri
- Cypripedium farreri
- Gentiana farreri
- Geranium farreri
- Picea farreri
- Rosa farreri
- Viburnum farreri

== Bibliography ==
- "Farrer, Reginald 1880–1920". Ohio State University. 2002. Archived from the original on 4 May 2007.
- "Inside Out – The shotgun gardener". BBC. 2003.
- Charlesworth, Michael (2018). The Modern Culture of Reginald Farrer: Landscape, Literature, and Buddhism. Cambridge: Legenda.
- Cox, E.H.M. (1930). The plant introductions of Reginald Farrer. London: New Flora and Silva Ltd.
- Hobson, Amanda (1992). "Reginald Farrer of Clapham". North Craven Heritage Trust.
- Massingham, Betty (1982). A Century of Gardeners. London: Faber & Faber. ISBN 978-0-571-11811-3.
- Shulman, Nicola (2011). A Rage for Rock Gardening: The Story of Reginald Farrer. London: Short Books. ISBN 9781907595998.
- Watt, Alistair (2019). Purdom and Farrer Plant Hunters on the Eaves of China. Melbourne: Alistair Watt (limited edition of 250. ISBN 978-0-646-59786-7.
