= Picea farreri =

Conservation status
- Vulnerable (IUCN 3.1)

Scientific classification
- Kingdom: Plantae
- Clade: Tracheophytes
- Clade: Gymnospermae
- Division: Pinophyta
- Class: Pinopsida
- Order: Pinales
- Family: Pinaceae
- Genus: Picea
- Species: P. farreri

Binomial name
- Picea farreri C.N. Page & Rushforth

Species of conifer

Picea farreri is a species of conifer in the pine family, Pinaceae. It is known by the common name Farrer's spruce. It is native to China, where it is known only from Yunnan, and to Myanmar.

This tree can reach 35 meters tall. It grows on limestone soils in cool, wet mountainous habitat.

Picea farreri is named after the plant collector Reginald Farrer who travelled extensively in China and what was then Burma.
