= Trow Ghyll skeleton =

Human remains discovered in 1947 in Yorkshire

Coordinates: 54.147104°N 2.371414°W

The Trow Ghyll skeleton is a set of human remains discovered on 24 August 1947 in a cave near Clapham in the West Riding of Yorkshire, England. It was named after a prominent topographical feature located some 900 yards (800 m) away. Although the identity of the body has never been ascertained, it has been claimed that the remains were those of a German spy. The unexplained death has been described as "the most notable" mystery over a possible Nazi agent in Britain.

== Discovery ==
On 24 August 1947, two friends who were keen potholers decided to go out looking for new potholes to explore near the famous Ingleborough Cave. They were Jim Leach (23 December 1920 – 15 March 2000) who was then working as an electrician and living at Great Harwood near Blackburn, and Harold Burgess (1918 – 11 August 2000), then a motor engineer and living in Leeds. The two were good friends (known as "Jim and Budge") who were members of the Northern Pennine Club and later became business partners.

At about 12:30 pm, they discovered a small hole (subsequently named Body Pot) which was partly obscured by stones. On moving the stones to make the entrance bigger, Leach climbed down about 10 feet where he saw a pair of shoes. Looking round he then saw the skull and the rest of the body, under a large stone (although it was not resting on the body); the remains had suffered advanced decomposition and there was hardly any flesh remaining. Burgess spotted near the body a small bottle of white powder which he assumed to be flash powder.

Leach and Burgess returned to Clapham to raise the alarm and later that afternoon returned to the cave with Police Sergeant Nock of Ingleton; the police stationed a guard outside the cave until the body could be photographed and then removed the following day. The remains were taken to Skipton mortuary and the effects found in the cave were sent to the forensic laboratory at Wakefield. The local community was quickly reassured that foul play had been ruled out as a cause of death.

=== A second skeleton ===
By coincidence, a week later on 31 August another skeleton was found not far away at Gaping Gill. These remains were unidentified but were found to be those of a man of between 25 and 35 years, who had died two or three years previously, and had been killed in a fall down the cave.

== Inquest ==
The findings of the various checks on the discovery were reported to an inquest held on 25 November at Skipton town hall before Coroner Stephen E. Brown and a jury. Leach and Burgess gave evidence of their discovery, and the police witnesses told of how they had preserved the evidence and transmitted it to the appropriate authorities. The main evidence at the inquest was given by the scientific witnesses.

=== Post mortem examination ===
On 26 August Professor P. L. Sutherland conducted a post mortem examination on the body. He found that the remains were those of a man who was 5 feet 5 1/4 inches (1.66 m) tall, aged between 22 and 30 at the time of death, and that death had occurred at least two and no more than six years before. He was able to rule out broken or diseased bones as a cause of death (none were fractured or broken), although not all of them were present. The bones were entirely separate from each other and the brain had disappeared; his clothes had rotted to the point where it was difficult to distinguish them.

=== Forensic tests ===
Lewis Nickolls of the North East Forensic Science Laboratory reported that the man had been wearing a blue shirt and tie, and a grey-blue suit with red and white stripes "about three to the inch". He had a tweedy herringbone overcoat, grey trilby hat, and a plum coloured scarf (which would have been over the mouth at the time of death). He also had light brown to auburn hair.

The most interesting evidence dealt with those of the man's possessions which had not rotted away. The glass bottle seen by Burgess turned out not to contain flash powder, but Sodium cyanide, a lethal poison. The bottle was full to the shoulder although it was possible, said Nickolls, to have extracted a lethal dose from it. An unbroken ampule of the same material was also found. Of his other possessions, the man had coins to the value of 11 shillings 5 ½ pence, with none of the coins newer than 1939. Nickolls said that the date of death would have been two years after that.

There were two pairs of shoes, one of which had been made in 1938 and the other in 1939. There was a mineral water bottle of a type supplied to hotels in Morecambe, Lancaster and Ingleton, and containing a blue 'crown' top not introduced until 1940. Other items found with the man included a wristlet watch, handkerchief, shaving tube, studs, toothbrush, fountain pen, propelling pencil, compass, box of matches, tablets, flashlamp, and toiletries. The man had a key but the police were unable to identify the lock which it opened.

== Identity ==
When the body was discovered, wide publicity was given and several people came forward to link missing relatives to the remains. The police compiled the suggestions into a list of 18, of which four turned out to be alive, ten were ruled out for bearing no resemblance to the remains, and for the four remaining it was impossible to say whether they were the man. The inquest returned a verdict that there was insufficient evidence of cause of death and to identify the remains.

== Mystery ==
At the inquest, Nickolls had been asked about the cyanide phial and ampule and said that it was used commercially and as a poison for vermin. However, he had to admit that he had not seen the same design before. The legal historian A. W. B. Simpson, who was living in Clapham at the time of the discovery, later noted that the only known users of such an ampule were spies operating in enemy countries, who had them in order to commit suicide in the event that they were discovered.

Simpson claimed that the individual was "plainly connected in some way with the German secret service" and that he was "the most notable .. mystery" over a German agent. He further remarked that "Such enquiries as I have made from persons who ought to know have produced evasiveness".

However, Simpson's claims are not supported by German intelligence documents discovered after the war. According to the British domestic security service, MI5, Germany had sent around 115 agents against Britain during the course of the war. Almost all of these had been successfully identified and caught, with the exception of Willem Ter Braak – not the body found at Trow Ghyll – who had committed suicide before being captured.

== See also ==
- List of unsolved deaths

== Books ==
- Craven Herald and Pioneer, 29 August and 28 November 1947
- In the Highest Degree Odious by A. W. B. Simpson (Oxford University Press, 1992) ISBN 0-19-825775-9
