= Clapham cum Newby =

Civil parish in North Yorkshire, England

Coordinates: 54.121°N 2.402°W

- Civil parish
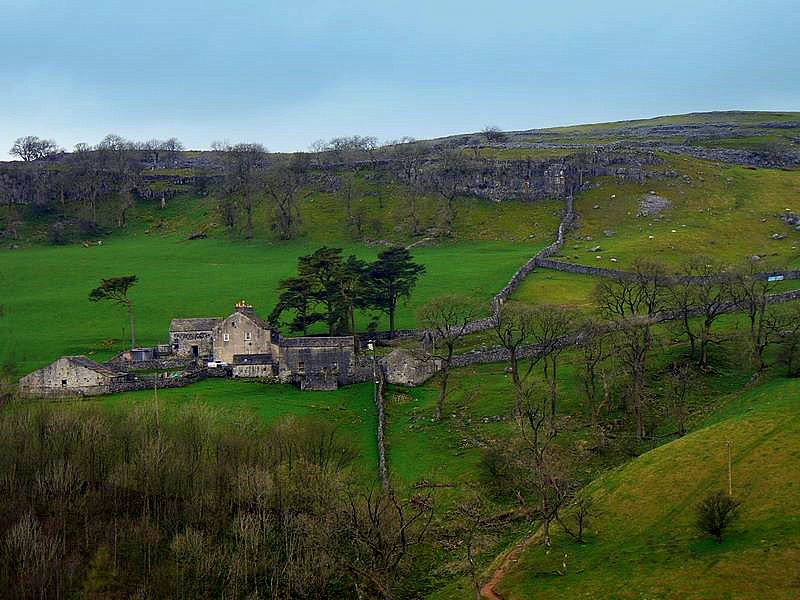

- Population: 640 (2011 census)
- OS grid reference: SD737695
- Civil parish: Clapham cum Newby
- Unitary authority: North Yorkshire
- Ceremonial county: North Yorkshire
- Region: Yorkshire and the Humber
- Country: England
- Sovereign state: United Kingdom
- Post town: LANCASTER
- Postcode district: LA2
- Police: North Yorkshire
- Fire: North Yorkshire
- Ambulance: Yorkshire

Clapham cum Newby is a civil parish in the county of North Yorkshire, England. It contains the villages of Clapham and Newby. According to the 2001 UK census, Clapham cum Newby parish had a population of 659, falling to 640 at the 2011 Census.

Until 1974 it was part of the West Riding of Yorkshire in the Settle Rural District. From 1974 to 2023 it was part of the Craven District, it is now administered by the unitary North Yorkshire Council.

== History ==
=== Listed monuments ===
Clapham cum Newby has 50 listed buildings.

Perhaps the oldest is the base of a standing cross, located outside the Manor House. The base was reportedly constructed during the reign (1199–1216) of King John, who granted Clapham a market charter. At some point over the next seven centuries, the original cross was removed from its base. In 1897, to commemorate the Diamond Jubilee of Queen Victoria, a new shaft and cross were installed on top of the original base.

The village church was constructed in the 15th century. The church was rebuilt and altered in the 19th century, leaving only the tower from the original building.

While the Manor House has its origins in a mediaeval building, the present building dates from 1701, while it was still a private residence. Later in the 18th century, a bridge across the river was constructed, to provide access to the local church. It is now a community centre.

=== Private broadband network ===
In 2016, the residents of Clapham cum Newby were informed by the UK government that it would be too expensive to extend superfast broadband to the area, due to it being a remote rural area. Residents responded to this by raising £250,000 to fund the installation of a private broadband connection to BT's network, which would serve everyone in the parish.

=== 1962 BBC TV report from the village ===
On the 29 January 1962 Alan Whicker reported from the village of Clapham cum Newby, in North Yorkshire, which holds the distinction of being the first place in Britain to have electric street lighting. As far back as 1896 the village was bathed in electric light, supplied by a water turbine-powered generator. However, the street lights fell dark, and there seemed to be little prospect of them coming back on. The video clip called "1962: The Story of Britain's First Electric Street Lamps | Tonight | BBC Archive" is available on youtube.
