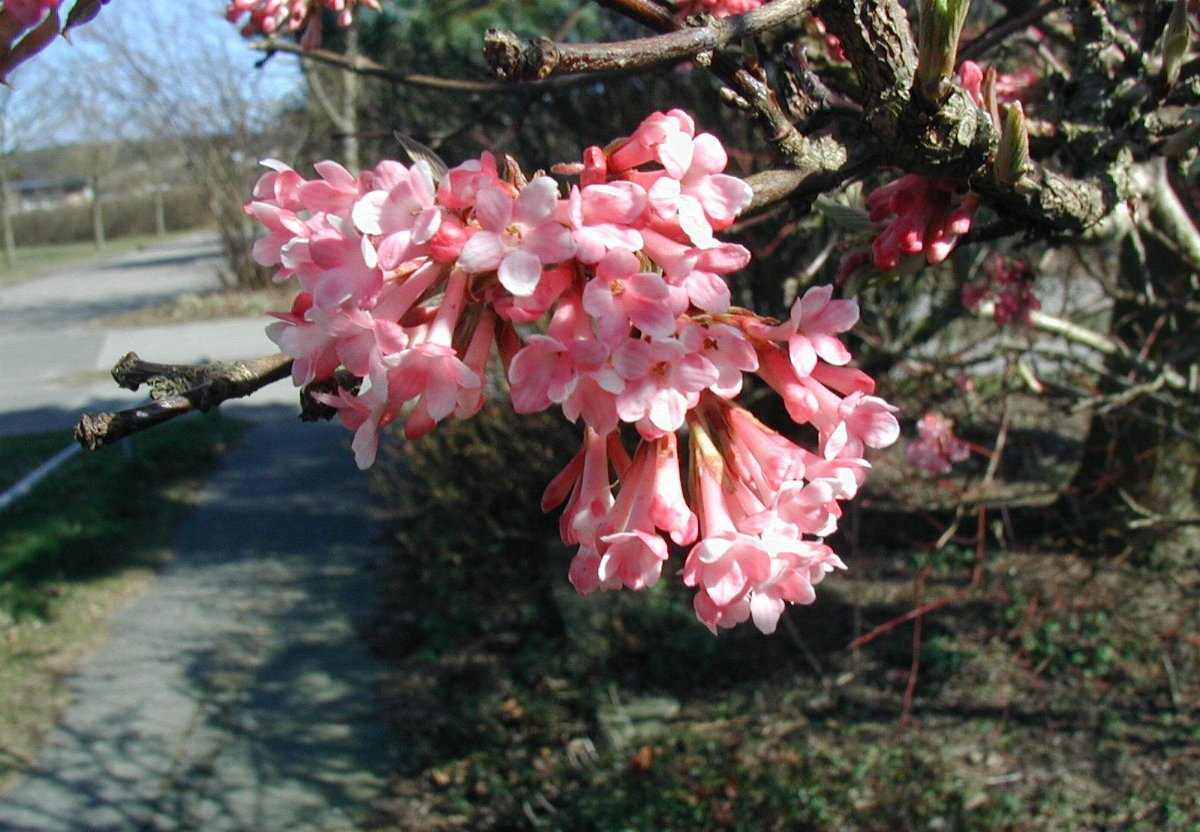

Scientific classification
- Kingdom: Plantae
- Clade: Embryophytes
- Clade: Tracheophytes
- Clade: Spermatophytes
- Clade: Angiosperms
- Clade: Eudicots
- Clade: Asterids
- Order: Dipsacales
- Family: Viburnaceae
- Genus: Viburnum
- Species: V. farreri

Binomial name
- Viburnum farreri Stearn

Synonyms
- Viburnum fragrans Bunge

= Viburnum farreri =

Species of flowering plant

Viburnum farreri (syn. V. fragrans) is a species of flowering plant in the family Viburnaceae (formerly Caprifoliaceae), native to northern China. Growing to 3 m (10 ft) tall by 2.5 m (8 ft) broad, it is an erect deciduous shrub with sweetly perfumed, pink-tinged white blooms in late autumn and early spring. Its dark green leaves are bronze when young, turning brilliant shades of red-purple in autumn. V. farreri grows in moist but well-drained soil in sun or partial shade.

The Latin specific epithet farreri commemorates the English plant collector Reginald Farrer.

This plant has gained the Royal Horticultural Society's Award of Garden Merit.

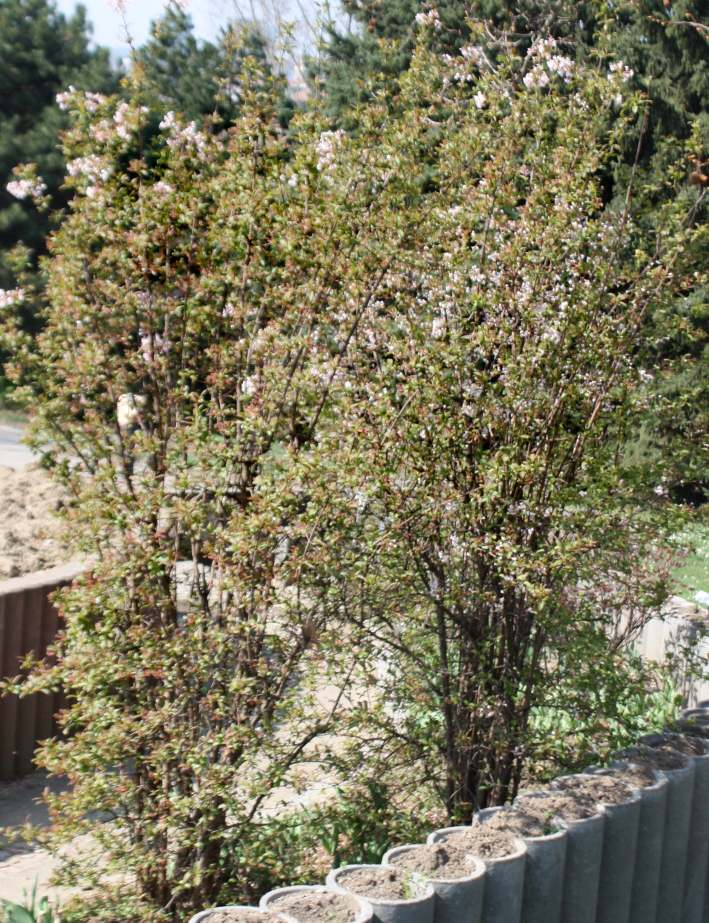
