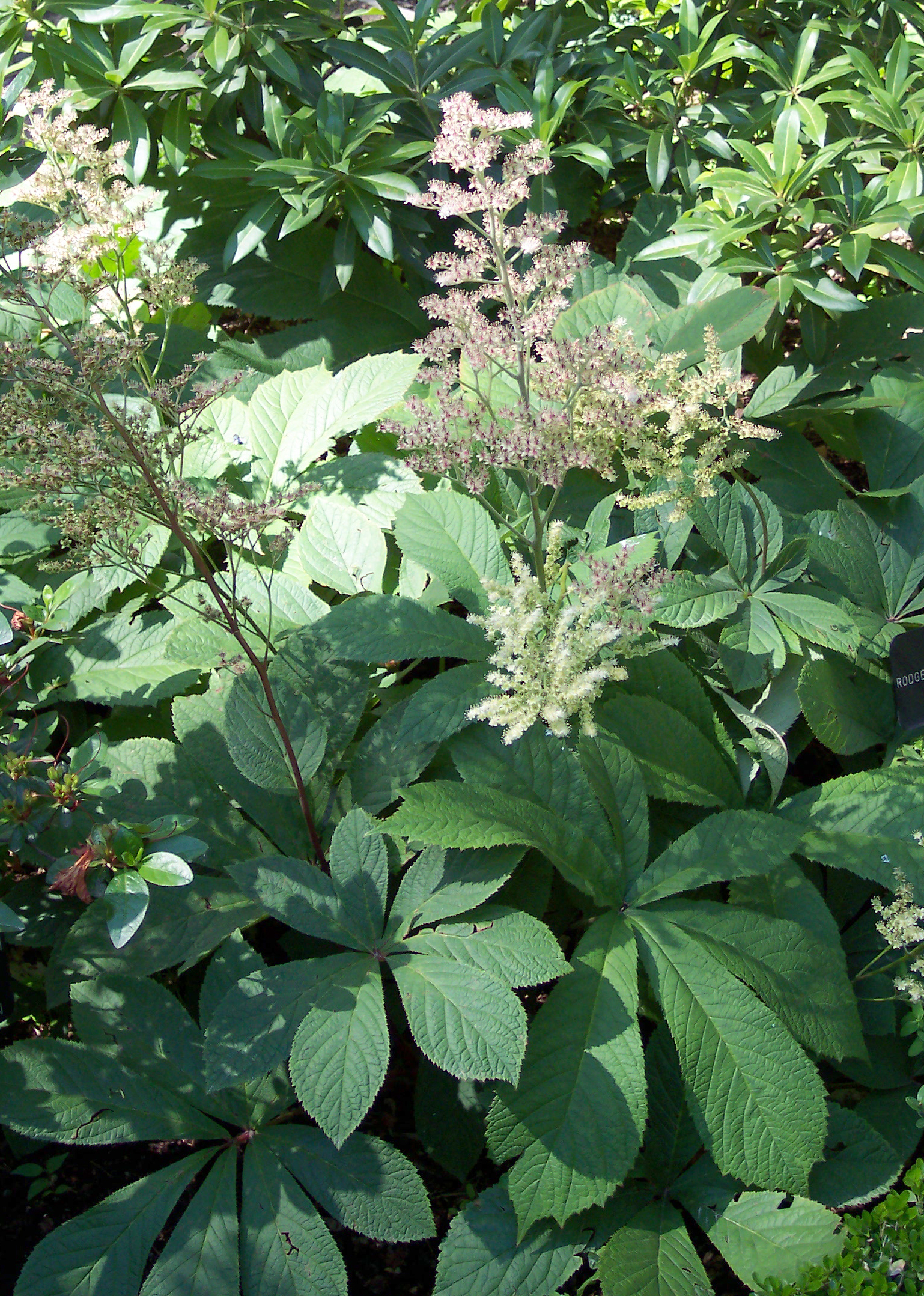
- Real Jardín Botánico de Madrid

Scientific classification
- Kingdom: Plantae
- Clade: Tracheophytes
- Clade: Angiosperms
- Clade: Eudicots
- Order: Saxifragales
- Family: Saxifragaceae
- Genus: Rodgersia
- Species: R. aesculifolia

Binomial name
- Rodgersia aesculifolia Batalin

= Rodgersia aesculifolia =

Species of flowering plant

Rodgersia aesculifolia is a species of flowering plant in the family Saxifragaceae, native to northern China. It is a substantial, herbaceous perennial growing to 2 m (7 ft) tall by 1 m (3 ft) broad, with textured palmate leaves up to 25 cm (10 in) long, and 60 cm (24 in) erect panicles made up of tiny, star-shaped white or pink flowers in summer. The leaves resemble those of the horse chestnut, hence the specific epithet aesculifolia (chestnut-leaved).

This plant has gained the Royal Horticultural Society's Award of Garden Merit.
