= Clapham, North Yorkshire =

Village in North Yorkshire, England

Coordinates: 54°7′2″N 2°23′31″W

Clapham
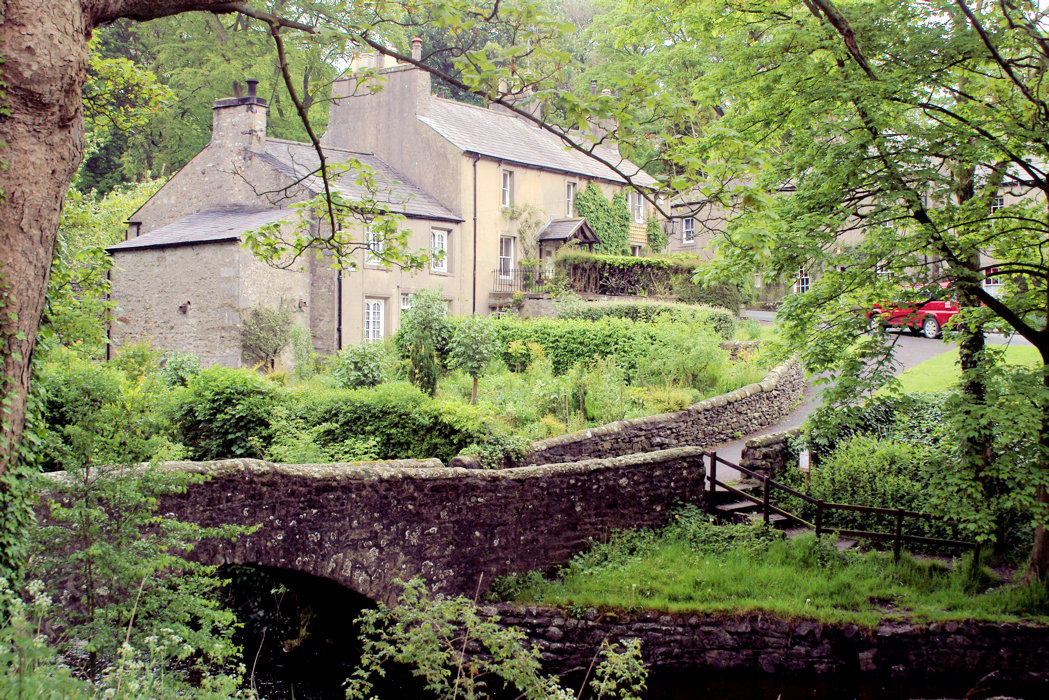
- A view in Clapham village

- Location within North Yorkshire
- OS grid reference: SD745694
  - London: 213 mi (343 km) south-east
- Civil parish: Clapham cum Newby
- Unitary authority: North Yorkshire
- Ceremonial county: North Yorkshire
- Region: Yorkshire and the Humber
- Country: England
- Sovereign state: United Kingdom
- Post town: LANCASTER
- Postcode district: LA2
- Dialling code: 015242
- Police: North Yorkshire
- Fire: North Yorkshire
- Ambulance: Yorkshire
- UK Parliament: Skipton and Ripon

Clapham is a village in the civil parish of Clapham cum Newby in North Yorkshire, England. It lies within the Yorkshire Dales National Park, 6 miles (10 km) north-west of Settle, and just off the A65 road.

Until 1974 it was part of the West Riding of Yorkshire. From 1974 to 2023 it was part of the Craven District, it is now administered by the unitary North Yorkshire Council.

== History ==
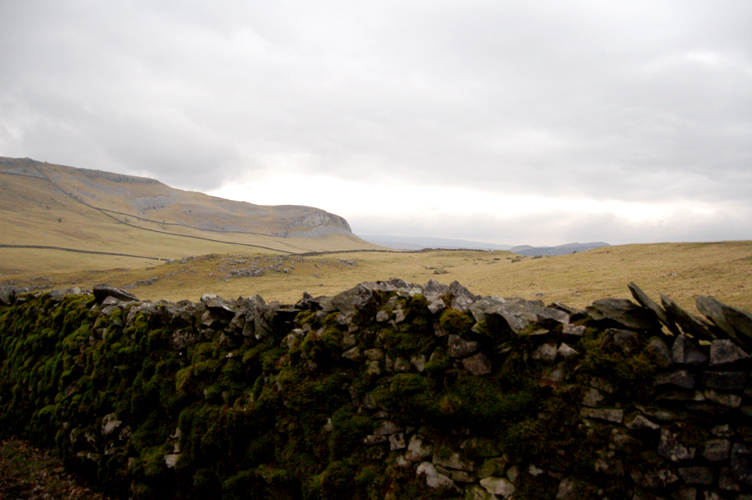
The Dales as seen on a trail out of Clapham

The name Clapham derives from the Old English clæpehām meaning 'village with a noisy stream'.

The church of St James in Clapham was founded in Norman times, and originally dedicated to St Michael. It is mentioned in records dating back to 1160. The village and church were burned during a Scottish raid following the Battle of Bannockburn in the early 14th century. The church tower was probably erected following this incident, but the rest of the church dates from the 19th century.

In the 14th century John de Clapham, who took his surname from the village, was a supporter of the Earl of Warwick and lived at Clapdale Castle. His descendants took part in the Wars of the Roses on the side of the House of Lancaster.

Since the 18th century Clapham has been home to the Farrer family who established their Ingleborough estate. The family owns, and is responsible for, much of the land, walls, woods, fields and moors of the village, surrounding countryside and farms. Perhaps the most famous member of the family was Reginald Farrer (1880–1920) who was a traveler and plant collector – the "father of rock gardening" – and was responsible for laying out much of the estate's gardens and landscape features.

Electricity has been generated on the Ingleborough estate since 1893. There is an operating water turbine-powered generator at the top of the village next to the waterfall. It was installed in 1948. Originally it supplied the church, Ingleborough Hall, Home Farm and 13 street lights. The old sawmill building, which has recently been converted into a cafe, contains a further turbine which has been preserved, in-situ, as an exhibit.

In August 1947 the Trow Ghyll skeleton was discovered in a cave above the village.

== Geography ==
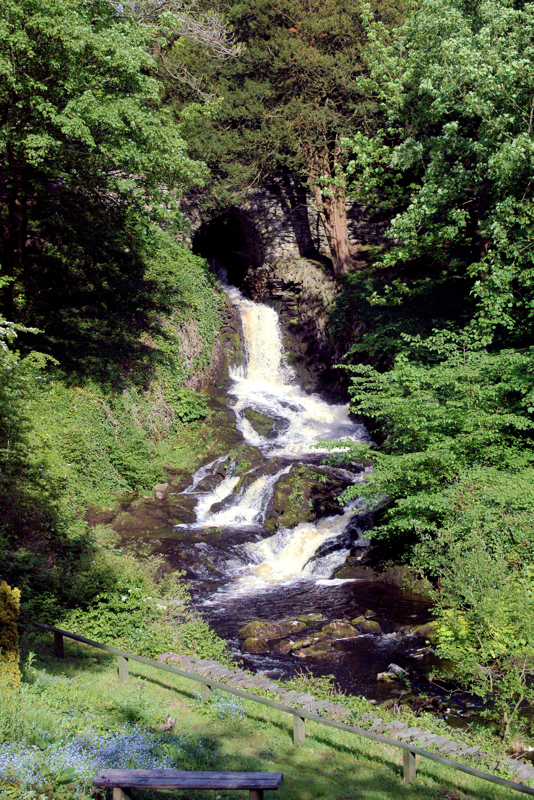
The waterfall at the top of the village.

Clapham is situated at the base of Ingleborough mountain, one of Yorkshire's "Three Peaks" – Ingleborough, Whernside and Pen-y-ghent – and is a starting point for its ascent.

Running through the village is Clapham Beck, fed from Fell Beck which starts on the slopes of Ingleborough and sinks into Gaping Gill, England's highest waterfall, where Fell Beck drops 110 metres vertically into a pothole, and exits via Ingleborough Cave into Clapham Beck. The beck feeds into the River Lune via the River Wenning. The beck is crossed by four bridges in the village (two footbridges: Brokken Bridge and Mafeking Bridge, and two road bridges).

Above the village is a man-made lake built and expanded in the 19th century. This river provides pressure for the water turbines and the drinking water supply, while the outflow fed an artificial waterfall at the top of the village.

Clapham lies on the Craven Fault zone, a complex geological fault which marks the division of the sandstone rocks of the Bowland area and the limestone of the Ingleborough area. However, the valley of Clapham Beck has cut through the limestone and into the underlying Ordovician basement rocks which produce soils that are acidic, not alkaline like those on the limestone. This is beneficial to the many species of rhododendron planted along Clapdale, which would suffer in alkaline soils.

== Local businesses and amenities ==
The village contains a village hall, the New Inn public house, a community-run shop, a small number of businesses, guest houses, and the Ingleborough Hall outdoor education centre. Clapham used to have a CofE Primary School which closed in July 2020.

From 1939 until 2000 The Dalesman magazine was based in the village.

The car park is run by the Yorkshire Dales National Park, with fees going directly to it.

Ingleborough Cave is a show cave open to the public, accessed through the grounds of the Ingleborough Estate. Beyond the show cave a path continues through the gorge of Trow Gill to the well-known vertical pothole Gaping Gill. Local caving clubs set up a winch down Gaping Gill during the Spring and August bank holidays, when it is open to the public.

The Cave Rescue Organisation, which serves people and animals above and below ground across a wide area of the Dales, is based in the village.

The village is served by Clapham railway station which is situated 1 mile (1.6 km) south-west of the village.

== Notable people ==
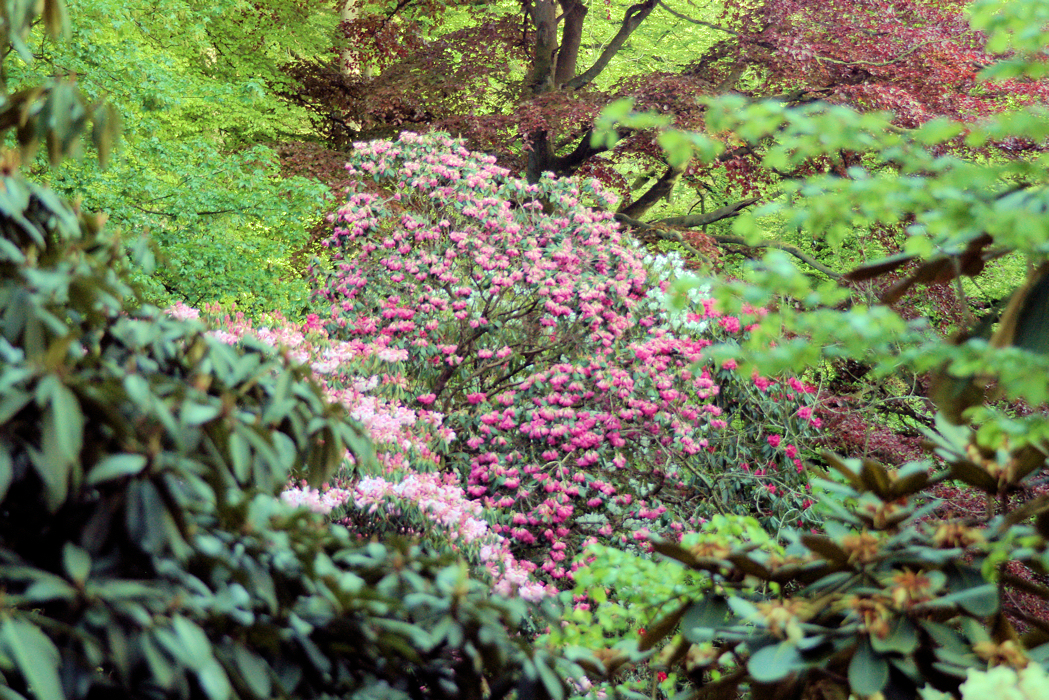
Rhododendrons planted by Reginald Farrer are still growing in the woods above the village.

The notable botanist Reginald Farrer (1880–1920) was brought up in Clapham. He collected many species of rhododendrons, shrubs and alpines in China, Tibet and Upper Burma between 1914 and 1920. Many of these were planted on the estate by Farrer. In some places he fired seeds at cliff faces from a shotgun, to give a 'natural' spread to his rock plants. In 2015 Historic England commissioned a measured survey and analytical assessment of the fabric, layout and history of Farrer's Clapham garden to inform the future repair and management of the site.

Author and playwright Alan Bennett has owned a cottage in Clapham for many years.

== See also ==
- Listed buildings in Clapham cum Newby
