= Rhino Rift =

Cave in Somerset, England

- Location within Somerset
- Location: Charterhouse, Somerset, UK
- OS grid: ST48475557
- Coordinates: 51°17′49″N 2°44′25″W
- Depth: 147 metres (482 ft)
- Length: 253 metres (830 ft)
- Discovery: 1971
- Geology: Limestone
- Entrances: 1
- Hazards: Loose boulders
- Access: Restricted
- Registry: Mendip Cave Registry

Rhino Rift is a cave near Charterhouse, in the Carboniferous Limestone of the Mendip Hills, in Somerset, England. The cave is part of the Cheddar Complex SSSI.

It is 253 m in length and reaches a depth of 147 m.

The cave was discovered in 1971 after a successful dig by members of the Wessex Cave Club. Previous digging by the University of Bristol Spelaeological Society had unearthed remains of extinct animals, hence the cave's name.

The cave is locked and access is controlled by the Charterhouse Caving Company.

== See also ==
- Caves of the Mendip Hills
