= Caves of the Mendip Hills =

Caves in Britain

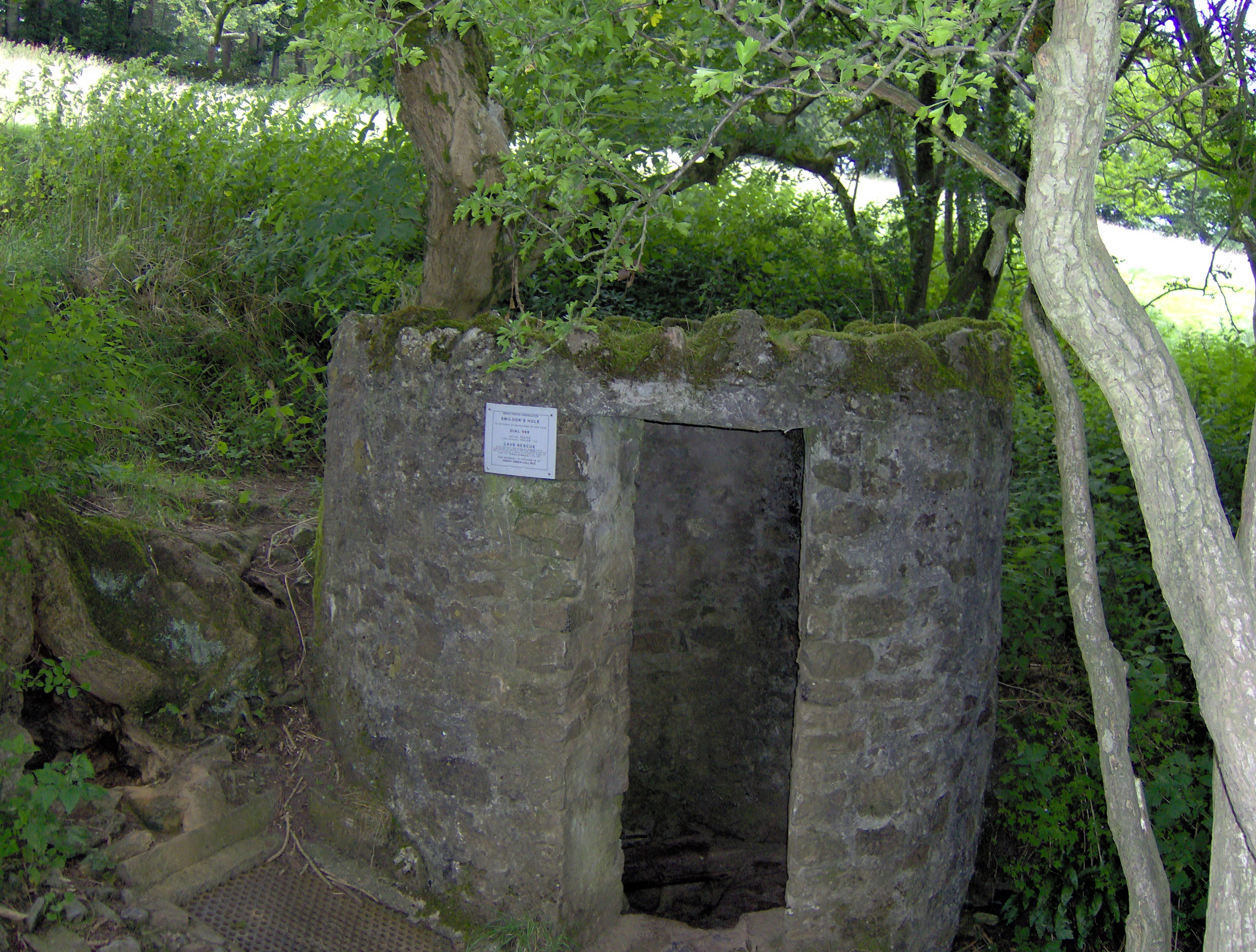
Entrance to Swildon's Hole at Priddy, Somerset

The caves of the Mendip Hills are formed by the particular geology of the Mendip Hills: large areas of limestone worn away by water make it a national centre for caving. The hills conceal the largest underground river system in Britain.

== Geology ==
The hills consist of anticlines of Carboniferous Limestone lying over Devonian Old Red Sandstone, with the sandstone exposed on the summits. When a surface stream running off the sandstone reaches the limestone it sinks below ground through a "swallet", (also known locally as a "slocker"), continuing on its way down towards sea level by enlarging existing cracks in the rock to form caves, and reappearing at the base of the limestone outcrop. As the water changes route within the hill some caves (or parts of caves) are left dry.

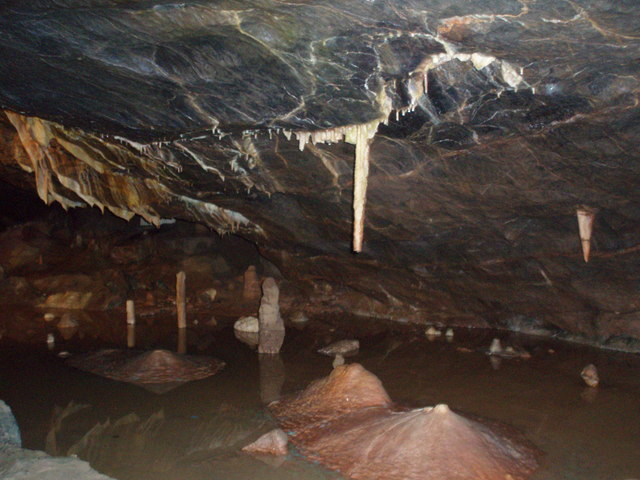
Stalagmites and stalactites in Gough's Cave

There is a characteristic type of Mendip cave, in which there is an initially steep descent, and then a more level stretch ending in a "sump" as the cave reaches and descends below the prevailing water table. The passages below the water table (which may be accessible by cave diving) often have a loop formation caused by the water flowing down a bedding plane and then rising up a fracture in the rock. Few caves on the Mendip Hills are more than 150 metres (492 ft) deep or a few kilometres in length, (with some notable exceptions, such as Swildon's Hole which is over 9 kilometres (6 mi) long), but a number are complex with several levels of passages which have been abandoned by the water, for example those around Cheddar.

The catchment area of the Cheddar Yeo, which rises in Gough's Cave, measures 54 km^{2} (20.8 sq mi). Dye marking shows that some of the water travels underground for up to 10 miles (16 km), taking up to 14 days to reach Cheddar.

== History ==
When Banwell Bone Cave was discovered in 1824, it was found to contain a great many animal bones which have been dated as about 80,000 years old.

The earliest scientifically dated human cemetery in Britain was found at Aveline's Hole, in Burrington Combe. The human bone fragments it contained, from about 21 different individuals, are thought to be between roughly 10,200 and 10,400 years old.

Archaeological evidence including pottery, flints, hearths, coins, burials and metalwork from the Mesolithic, Neolithic, Bronze Age, Iron Age and Roman eras have been found in many of the caves. A number of Mendip caves were found by miners, for example the Banwell Caves which were opened by ochre miners in 1757.

Many caves in the Mendip area were photographed by caver Harry Savory early in the 20th century using huge cameras, glass plates and flash powder. His work has been described as "...of a quality to shame virtually all modern cave photographers". The 1990 book A Man Deep in Mendip: The Caving Diaries of Harry Savory, 1910-1921 provides a diary made by Harry Savory, explained and extended by his son John.

A number of important cave excavations and explorations were undertaken, from the 1920s onwards, by pioneer caver Herbert E. Balch. The caves are recorded in the Mendip Cave Registry and Archive.

== Access ==
The caves that are easily accessible to the public are at Cheddar Gorge and Wookey Hole, but the vast majority of the caves require specialist equipment and knowledge. Many of the caves are gated and operate leader systems in an attempt to reduce the damage caused when the caves are visited. Local caving groups organise trips and continue to discover new caverns. Some estimates put the number of cavers active on the Mendip Hills over a busy weekend at more than 500.

== Cave diving ==
Attempts made in the Mendip Hills to traverse from one cave to another through the underground rivers led to the development of cave diving; the first cave dive attempt in Britain took place at Swildon's Hole in 1934. The first successful cave dive in Britain was achieved the following year at Wookey Hole Caves, where the last sump is currently the deepest in Britain at 90 m (300 ft).

== Sites of special scientific interest ==
The cave complexes at St Dunstan's Well Catchment, Thrupe Lane Swallet, Lamb Leer and Priddy Caves have been identified as geological Site of Special Scientific Interest. There are also caves within the Cheddar Complex SSSI.

== List of caves ==
A selection of the better known caves are listed below

Name	Location	Map	Length (km)	Depth (m)	Notes
Attborough Swallet	Chewton Mendip	ST56105181	0.22	44	
Aveline's Hole	Burrington Combe	ST47615867	0.067	16	Site of early cemetery and cave markings
Axbridge Ochre Mine	Axbridge	ST429552	0.132	33	
Banwell Caves	Banwell	ST38225881	0.097	21	geological Site of Special Scientific Interest
Banwell Ochre Caves	Banwell	ST40605904			geological Site of Special Scientific Interest
Bos Swallet	Burrington Combe	ST47095837	0.076	37	
Bath Swallet	Burrington Combe	ST47255845	0.078	42	
Charterhouse Cave	Charterhouse	ST47755620	4.868	205	Close, but not connected, to GB Cave; the deepest cave on the Mendip Hills
Compton Martin Ochre Mine	Compton Martin	ST543566	0.4	21	geological Site of Special Scientific Interest
Cox's Cave	Cheddar	ST46465390	0.1	18	Open to the general public as a show cave
Drunkard's Hole	Burrington Combe	ST47145839	0.127	48	
Eastwater Cavern	Priddy	ST53885062	2.8	160	One of the Priddy Caves; very extensive with routes ranging from moderate to extreme
East Twin Swallet	Burrington Combe	ST47955814	0.274	38	
Fairy Cave Quarry; *Balch Cave; *Conning Tower Cave; *Fairy Cave; *Fernhill Cave; *Hillier's Cave; *Hillwithy Cave; *Shatter Cave; *W/L Cave; *Withyhill Cave	Stoke St Michael	ST65654775	1.17	<60	Many highly decorated
GB Cave	Charterhouse	ST47595623	1.95	134	Part of the Cheddar Complex SSSI
Goatchurch Cavern	Burrington Combe	ST47585823	0.75	55	Very popular with novice cavers
Gough's Cave	Cheddar	ST46705391	2.135	90	Open to the general public as a show cave
Hunter's Hole	Priddy	ST54925005	0.275	58	One of the Priddy Caves
Lamb Leer	East Harptree	ST54325505	0.64	67	geological Site of Special Scientific Interest
Longwood Swallet	Charterhouse	ST48615571	1.65	175	Part of the Cheddar Complex SSSI; interesting routes involving two streamways
Manor Farm Swallet	Charterhouse	ST49825566	1.06	156	
Picken's Hole	Compton Bishop	ST3968055004			
Pierre's Pot	Burrington Combe	ST47635837	0.465	33	Involves a severe squeeze to reach lower reaches
Read's Cavern	Burrington Combe	ST46825844	1.224	62	
Reservoir Hole	Cheddar	ST47465447			Length/depth to be confirmed following the recent discovery of what is believed to be the largest chamber under the Mendip Hills
Rhino Rift	Charterhouse	ST48475557	0.25	147	Part of the Cheddar Complex SSSI; unusually vertical and suited to SRT
Rod's Pot	Burrington	ST47215844	0.188	45	In September 2007, digging established a link through to nearby Bath Swallet.
Sidcot Swallet	Burrington	ST47545828	0.2	28	
St Cuthbert's Swallet	Priddy	ST54305050	6.7	145	One of the Priddy Caves; the most complex cave on Mendip
Stoke Lane Slocker	Stoke St Michael	ST66874745	2.18	<60	Short but intimidating sump leads to well-decorated chambers. Further sumps have rarely been explored.
Swildon's Hole	Priddy	ST53125131	9.15	167	One of the Priddy Caves; the longest cave on Mendip. The streamway extends to sump 12 with other dry routes.
Thrupe Lane Swallet	Shepton Mallet	ST60384580	1.147	120	geological Site of Special Scientific Interest; unusually vertical cave, suitable for SRT
Tyning's Barrow Swallet	Cheddar	ST47135638	1.29	132	
Upper Flood Swallet	Charterhouse	ST50575576	4.720	136	
Wigmore Swallet	Priddy	ST55715256	1.0	110	One of the Priddy Caves.
Withybrook Slocker	Stoke St Michael	ST65534715	0.23	26	Upstream part of caves in Fairy Cave Quarry
Wookey Hole Caves	Wookey Hole	ST53184802	3.66	182	Open to the general public as a show cave

== Bibliography ==
- Barrington, Nicholas; Stanton, William (1977). Mendip: The Complete Caves and a View of the Hills. Cheddar Valley P. ISBN 0-9501459-2-0.
- Irwin, David John; Knibbs, Anthony J. (1999). Mendip Underground: A Cavers Guide. Bat Products. ISBN 0-9536103-0-6.
- Gray, Alan; Taviner, Rob; Witcombe, Richard (2013). Mendip Underground: A Caver's Guide (5th ed.). Wells: Mendip Cave Registry and Archive. ISBN 9780953131051.
