= Tyning's Barrow Swallet =

Cave in Somerset, England

Coordinates: 51.304117°N 2.759725°W

- Interactive map of Tyning's Barrow Swallet
- Location: Cheddar
- Depth: 132 m (433 ft)
- Length: 1.29 km (4,200 ft)
- Geology: Limestone
- Access: locked
- Cave survey: 1. Bracknell CC (overlaid on map); 2. Mendip Cave Registry and Archive

Tyning's Barrow Swallet (grid reference ST47135638) is a cave between Charterhouse and Shipham in the limestone of the Mendip Hills, in Somerset, England. The cave is close to GB Cave and also to Charterhouse Cave, the deepest cave in the region.

Tyning's Barrow Swallet is 1.29 km (4,200 ft) in length and reaches a depth of 132 m (433 ft).

== Access ==
The entrance is kept locked, and the key is available from the nearby farmhouse on payment of small goodwill fee.

== See also ==
- Caves of the Mendip Hills
