= East Twin Swallet =

Cave in Somerset, England

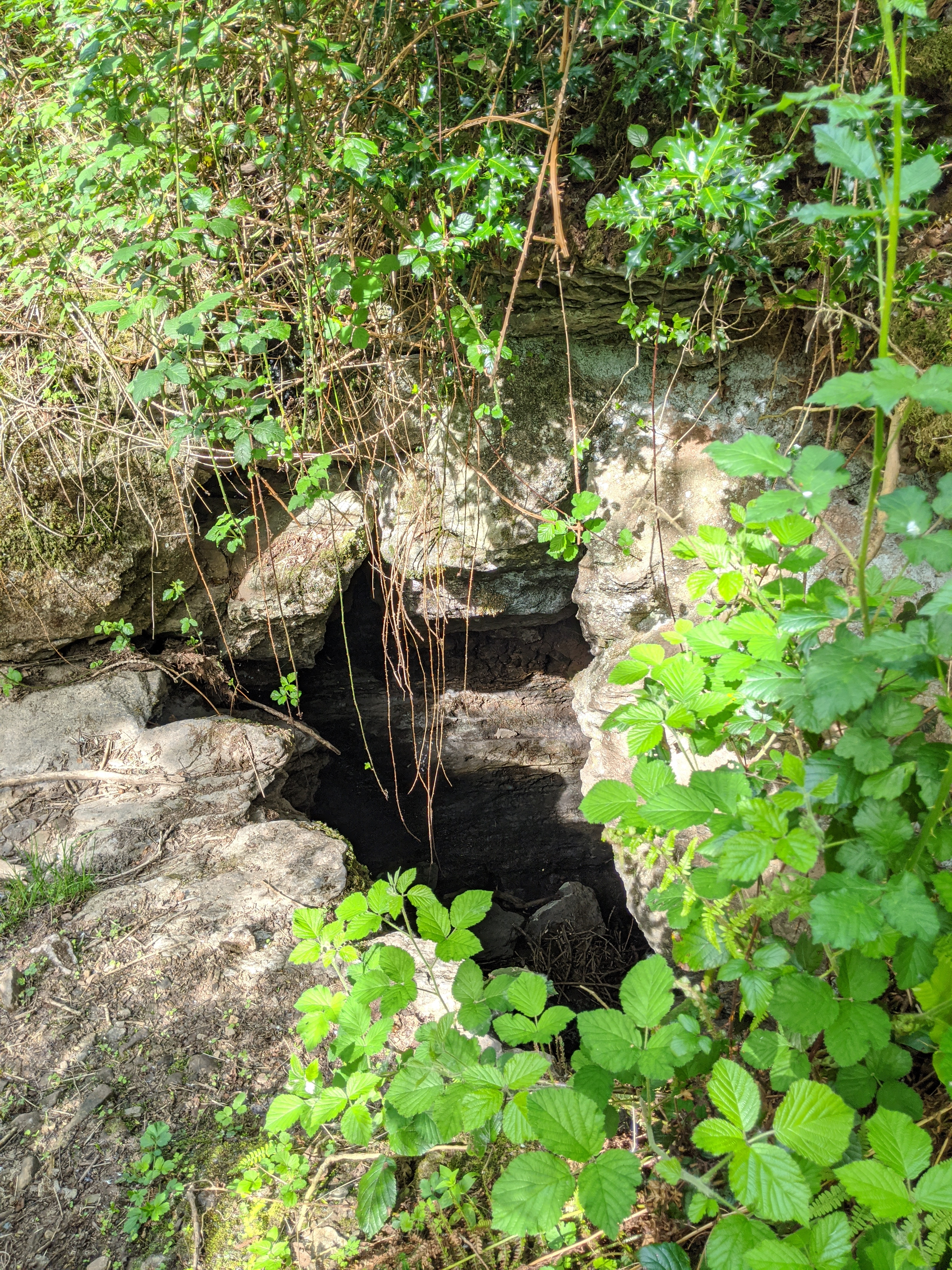
- East Twin Swallet entrance.

- Location within Somerset
- Location: Burrington Combe, Somerset, UK
- OS grid: ST47955814
- Coordinates: 51°19′12″N 2°44′54″W
- Depth: 38 metres (125 ft)
- Length: 150 metres (490 ft)
- Geology: Limestone
- Entrances: 1
- Hazards: Loose boulders
- Access: Free
- Registry: Mendip Cave Registry

East Twin Swallet also known as Upper Twin Swallet is a karst cave in Burrington Combe on the Mendip Hills in Somerset, England.

The cave is not very stable. The floor is strewn with boulders under which the stream normally flows. The walls and roof, especially in the upstream portion of the Second Chamber, consist of boulders cemented together with red mud. In the stream passage the mud contains many fossils, mainly crinoids and brachiopods, dissolved out of their limestone matrix. This is a common phenomenon in the caves of the area.

== See also ==
Caves of the Mendip Hills
