= Pierre's Pot =

Cave in Somerset, England

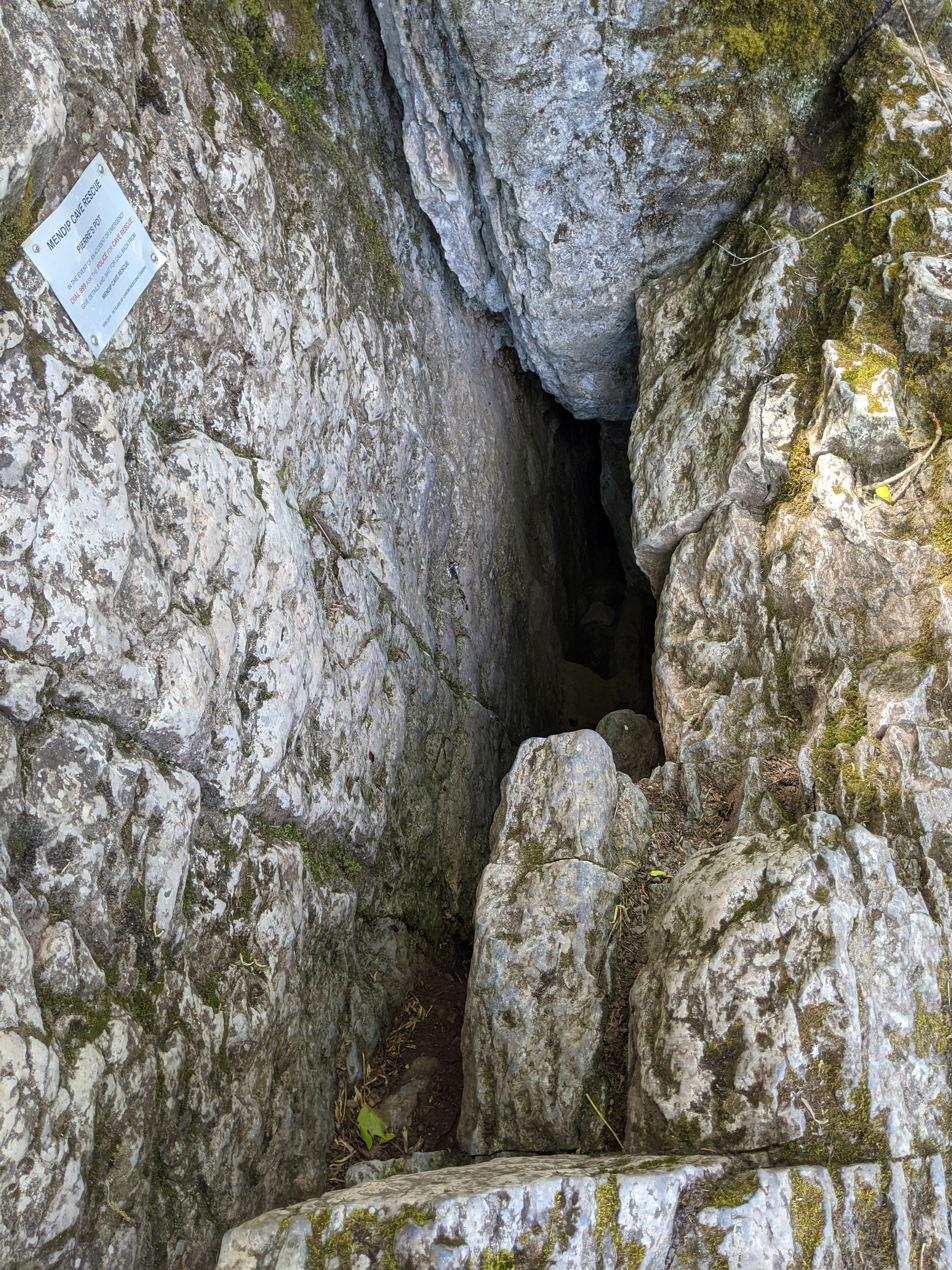
- Pierre's Pot entrance

- Location within Somerset
- Location: Burrington Combe, Somerset, UK
- OS grid: ST 47635837
- Coordinates: 51°19′19″N 2°45′11″W
- Depth: 47 metres (154 ft)
- Length: 985 metres (3,232 ft)
- Geology: Carboniferous limestone
- Entrances: 1
- Hazards
- Access: Free
- Registry: Mendip Cave Registry

Pierre's Pot is a karst cave in Burrington Combe on the Mendip Hills in Somerset, England.

The cave was discovered in 1983 and has two main levels, the lower level being reached through an extremely tight rift. There is an active streamway and sump which, following a 15 m (49 ft) dive, leads to another streamway and a number of passages.

The derivation of the cave's name is from one of the nicknames of Mike "Fish" Jeanmaire of the Axbridge Caving Group in the early 1960s.

== See also ==
Caves of the Mendip Hills
