= Hunter's Hole =

Cave in Somerset, England

- Interactive map of Hunter's Hole
- Location: Priddy
- Coordinates: 51.246°N 2.650°W
- Depth: 58m
- Length: 0.275km
- Discovery: 1954
- Geology: Limestone

Hunter's Hole (or Hunters' Hole) is a cave in the Mendip Hills in Somerset, England. It is behind a pub, known as the Hunters Lodge Inn just outside Priddy where visitors can park. It is accessed via a permanent ladder, about 100m behind the pub in a small dip between some trees.

The main cave was first entered after digging by Wessex and BEC cavers in 1954.

The cave itself consists of a series of shafts down into the main chamber, named the "railway tunnel". Due to the cave mainly being the ascent and descent, it is used to practise single rope technique (SRT).

It is part of the Priddy Caves Site of Special Scientific Interest and described as "an excellent example of a shaft complex draining a closed depression. The roof of the main shaft shows a variety of features such as soil and boulder bridges and scalloped and speleothem lined rifts, all draining the surface depression. This cave differs from the others at Priddy in apparently not having formed as a stream swallet."

== See also ==
- Caves of the Mendip Hills
