= St Cuthbert's Swallet =

Cave in the Mendip Hills, Somerset, England

Coordinates: 51°15′06″N 2°39′15″W

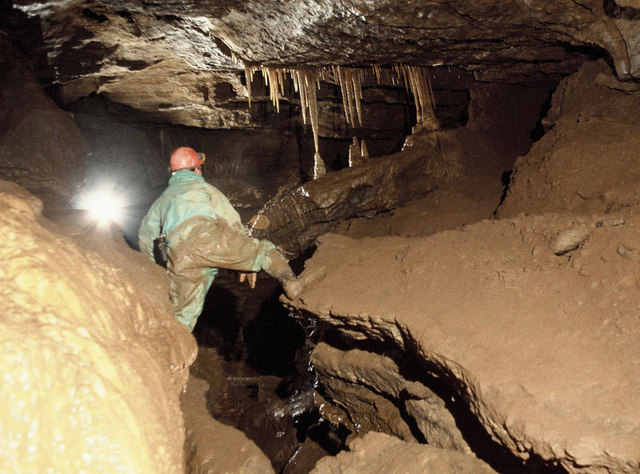
- Interactive map of St Cuthbert's Swallet
- Location: Priddy
- OS grid: ST 543 505
- Depth: 145 metres (476 ft)
- Length: 6.7 kilometres (4 mi)
- Geology: Limestone
- Access: Bristol Exploration Club
- Cave survey: Geological Conservation Review/Bristol Exploration Club
- Registry: Mendip Cave Registry

St. Cuthbert's Swallet is the second longest, and most complex, cave on the Mendip Hills, in Somerset, England. It forms a major part of the Priddy Caves system and water entering this swallet re-emerges at Wookey Hole. St. Cuthbert's Swallet is part of, and lies underneath, the Priddy Pools Site of Special Scientific Interest.

It is named because of its location in the St Cuthbert Out parish of Wells, and was originally called St Cuthbert's Pot.

== History ==
Interest in the possible existence of a cave at this location existed before 1927, and increased when St Cuthbert's Pool suddenly drained away that year. Attempts to discover an entrance took place between 1944 and 1953, when entry was finally gained. Exploration continued to push the known limits of the cave throughout the 1950s and 1960s. Sump 1 was passed in 1969. Sump 2 has not yet been passed.

== Access ==
Due to a still enforceable court injunction dating from 1863, which required that the stream now known to run through the cave to Wookey Hole was not polluted, the cave is locked and access is controlled by the Bristol Exploration Club on behalf of the landowners. No novices are allowed to enter.

== Description ==
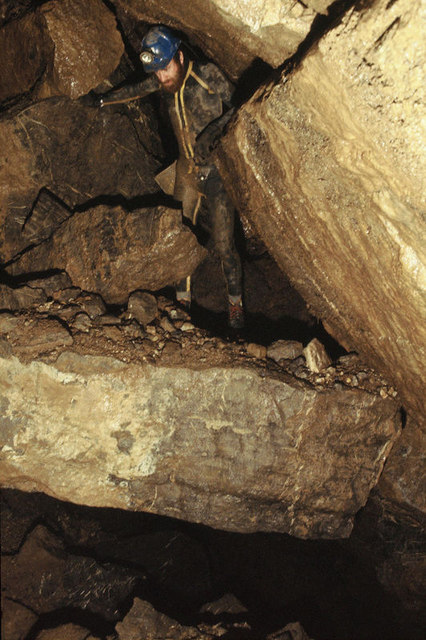
Boulder collapse in St. Cuthbert's Swallet

St. Cuthbert's Swallet is a classic example of a deep phreatic cave system developed at a depth of not less than 85 metres (280 ft) beneath the water table. It contains inclined bedding plane mazes at many levels, fault-guided rifts and some significant chambers. Nine successive phases of sediment deposition, stalagmite deposition and stream erosion have been recognised at the site, providing an exceptional record of environmental change through the warm and cold phases of the Ice Age.

St. Cuthbert's Swallet is attractive to cavers, for its complexity and size, reaching over 6.7 kilometres (4.2 mi) and a depth of 145 metres (476 ft), and having numerous large decorated chambers, forming phreatic mazes on seven distinct levels. Among its displays are large and impressive calcite groups such as the 'Curtains', 'Cascade', Gour Hall with its 6.1-metre (20 ft) gour, 'The Beehive', Canyon Series and the 'Balcony' formations in September Chamber. There are also mini-formations including floating calcite crystals, over twenty nests of "cave pearls", and delicate fern-like crystals less than 4 millimetres (0.16 in) long.

The cave has also been identified as an important site for the study of cave insects. Oligaphorura (formerly Archaphorura) schoetti (a type of springtail) is a troglophile, up to 1.7 millimetres (0.07 in) in length and common in many caves. Most specimens are female but a male specimen was collected from St. Cuthbert's Swallet in 1969.

== See also ==
- Caves of the Mendip Hills
