= Cox's Cave =

Show cave in Somerset, England

Coordinates: 51°16′54″N 2°46′08″W

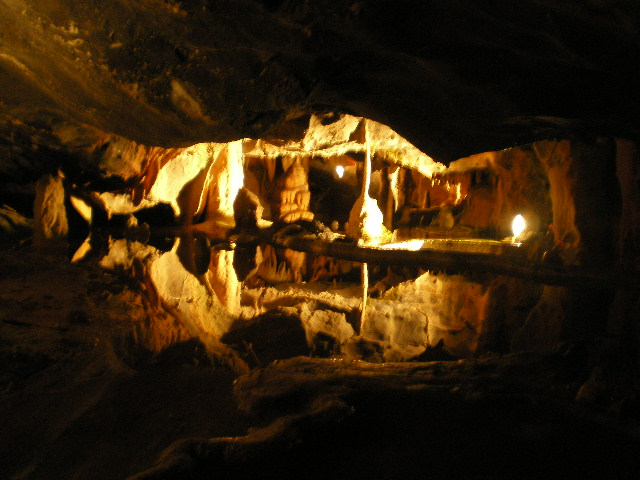
- Stalagmites and Stalactites in Cox's cave shown in a reflecting pool
- Interactive map of Cox's Cave
- Location: Cheddar
- OS grid: ST46465390
- Length: 100 m (330 ft)
- Height variation: 18 m (59 ft)
- Elevation: 23 m (75 ft)
- Geology: Carboniferous limestone
- Show cave opened: 1838
- Lighting: Electric
- Registry: Mendip Cave Registry
- Website: http://www.cheddargorge.co.uk/explore/coxs-cave

Cox's Cave is in Cheddar Gorge on the Mendip Hills, in Somerset, England. It is open to the public as a show cave.

The cave is named after mill owner George Cox who discovered it in 1837, while quarrying limestone for a new building. Cox immediately opened it as a show cave the following year and ran it as a private enterprise until the landowner, Thomas Thynne, 5th Marquess of Bath, took it over at the beginning of the 20th century. It was connected by a tunnel to the adjacent artificial Pavey's Cave in 1987.

The cave consists of seven small grottoes, joined by low archways. One section of the cave is known as the Home of the Rainbow, where traces of minerals have been brought in from the surface, and have given the stalagmites a wide range of colour, from nearly black, green, and orange to pure white. The famous French speleologist Édouard-Alfred Martel visited this cave and declared that "out of 600 caves, Cox's was admired the most".

== See also ==
- Caves of the Mendip Hills
