= Drunkard's Hole =

Cave in Somerset, England

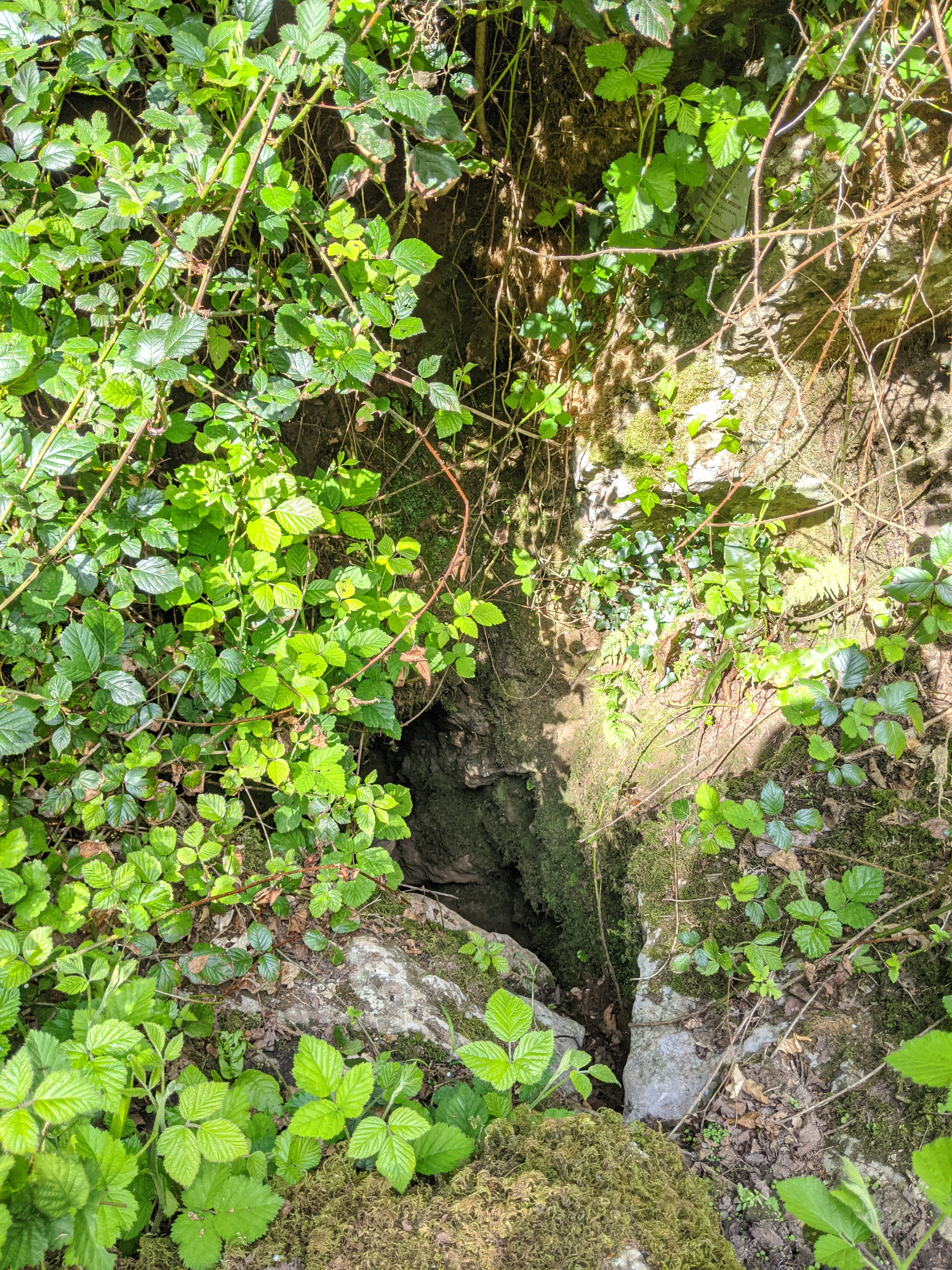
- Drunkard's Hole entrance

- Location within Somerset
- Location: Burrington Combe, Somerset, UK
- OS grid: ST 4714 5839
- Coordinates: 51°19′20″N 2°45′36″W
- Depth: 48 metres (157 ft)
- Length: 127 metres (417 ft)
- Discovery: 1934
- Geology: Limestone
- Entrances: 1
- Hazards: Unstable boulders, fall
- Access: Free
- Registry: Mendip Cave Registry

Drunkard's Hole is a karst cave in Burrington Combe on the Mendip Hills in Somerset, England.

== See also ==
- Caves of the Mendip Hills
