= Priddy Pools =

Protected area in Priddy, Somerset, England

- Site of Special Scientific Interest
- Location within Somerset
- Location of Priddy Pools.
- Area of search: Somerset
- Grid reference: ST545510
- Coordinates: 51.25634°N 2.65340°W
- Interest: Biological and Geological
- Area: 52.7 ha (130 acres)
- Notification date: 1972

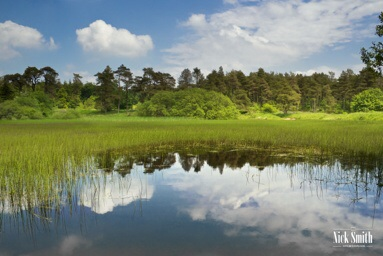
Priddy Pools by Nick Smith

Priddy Pools (grid reference ST545510) is a 52.7-hectare (130-acre) geological Site of Special Scientific Interest at Priddy in the Mendip Hills, Somerset, notified in 1972.

The pools provided the water supply for the Priddy Mineries which is now a Nature Reserve.

== Biological ==
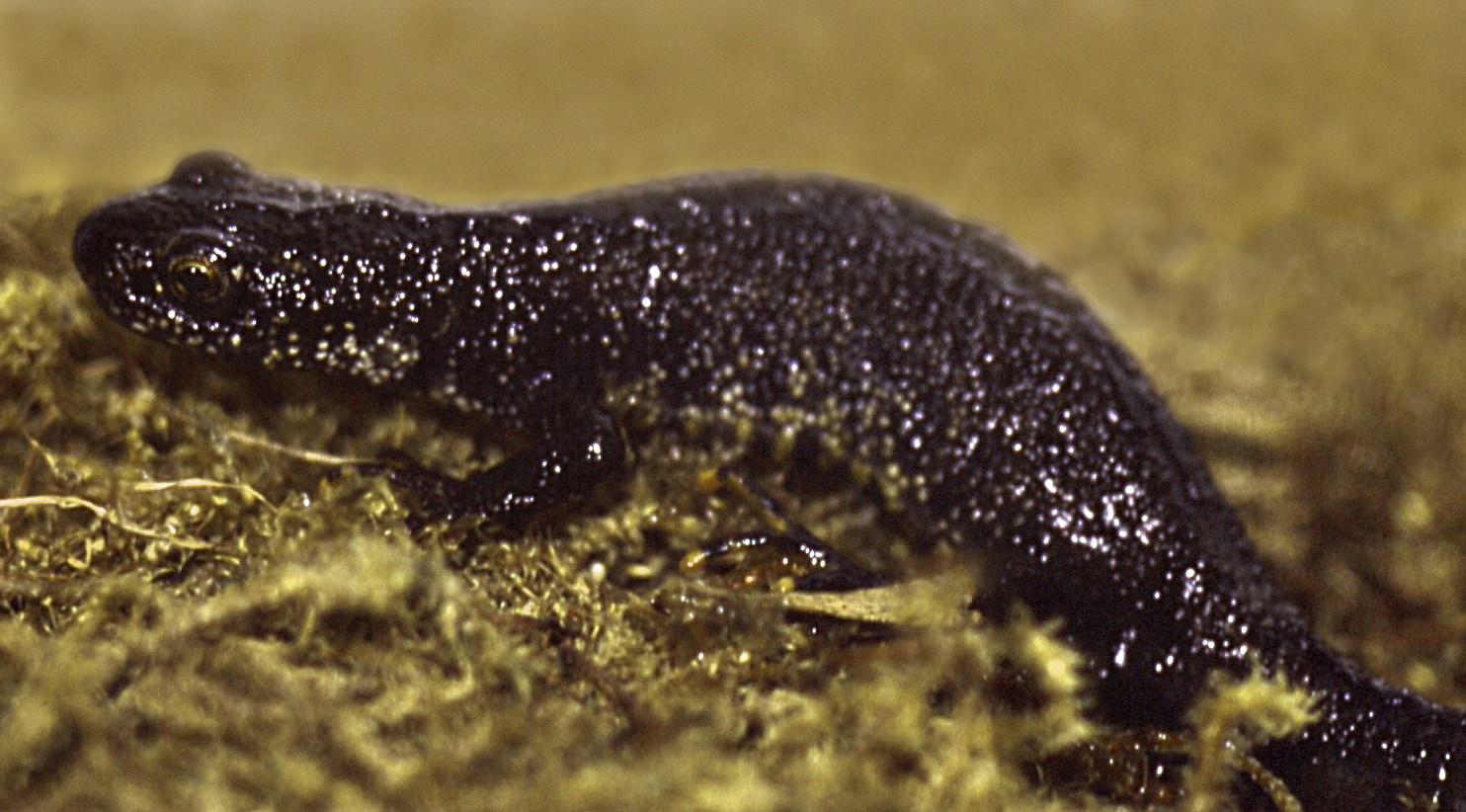
Great crested newt

This site supports a very rich invertebrate and amphibian fauna. A wide range of seminatural habitats are present, including valley mire, open water, swamp and tall fen. These habitats have a restricted distribution in the Mendip Hills. Priddy Pools is situated in the central Mendip lead orefield and the ecology of the area bears the mark of the lead industry. The northern pool was dammed in the 1850s to provide a supply of running water for the sifting and washing of slag. Lead was processed at St Cuthbert's Works until 1908. The hydrology of the site is complex. Nutrient-poor water flows from springs in the north of the site to St Cuthbert's Swallet where it disappears before re-emerging at Wookey Hole. A valley mire has developed in the area immediately to the south of the springs. Sphagnum recurvum and Sphagnum auriculatum are the most frequent mosses, and a range of higher plants can be found. Additional interest lies in the flora that can tolerate high concentrations of lead in the soil such as spring sandwort (Minuartia verna) and the moss Ditrichum plumbicola.

Priddy Pools supports a very rich fauna. Fifteen species of dragonfly have been recorded; as well as supporting the only population of downy emerald in the Mendips, the site hosts the notable four-spotted chaser (Libellula quadrimaculata) and ruddy darter (Sympetrum sanguineum). Five British species of amphibian occur and there are good populations of great crested newt (Triturus cristatus), smooth newt (Triturus vulgaris) and palmate newt (Triturus helveticus). Three species of reptile, viviparous lizard (Lacerta vivipara), adder (Vipera berus), grass snake (Natrix natrix), and at least two species of fish; European perch, (Perca fluviatilis) and three-spined stickleback (Gasterosteus aculeatus) are present. Breeding birds include moorhen (Gallinula chloropus), coot (Fulica atra), mallard (Anas platyrhynchos), reed bunting (Emberiza schoeniclus) and sedge warbler (Acrocephalus schoenobaenus). Priddy Pools is an important research site. Detailed study of the algae in the northern pool was carried out in the late 1960s and early 1970s, as part of the International Biological Programme.

== Geological ==
The site contains the entrance to St Cuthbert's Swallet cave, and overlies a large part of the cave complex reached through St Cuthbert's Swallet. This cave is an integral part of the Priddy Caves system which contains over 10 miles of surveyed cave passages divided between two major systems and four minor systems, all interconnected. All the caves are sinkhole systems, fed by sinkholes at the ground surface, and 3 of them exceed 100 metres in depth; in all the caves the detailed disposition and form of the passages can be seen clearly to have followed marked lines of natural weakness in the rocks. St Cuthbert's Swallet was formed by the erosive action of water flowing beneath the water-table at considerable depth (so called "phreatic development"). St Cuthbert's Swallet is a classic example of a deep phreatic cave system, containing inclined bedding plane mazes at many levels, fault-guided rifts and some significant chambers. Nine successive phases of sediment deposition, stalagmite deposition and stream erosion have been recognised in St Cuthbert's Swallet, providing an exceptional record of environmental change through the warm and cold phases of the Ice Age.

== Use in literature ==
In his 1995 book "Our Game", John le Carré uses "Priddy Pool" as the site for the drowning of one of his characters.
