= Thrupe Lane Swallet =

Cave system in Somerset, England

- Interactive map of Thrupe Lane Swallet
- Location: Croscombe, Somerset
- OS grid: ST603458
- Coordinates: 51°12′38″N 2°34′08″W
- Depth: 117 m (384 ft)
- Length: 1,417 m (4,649 ft)
- Geology: Limestone
- Cave survey: Geological Conservation Review
- Registry: Mendip Cave Registry

Thrupe Lane Swallet
- Site of Special Scientific Interest
- Location of Thrupe Lane Swallet.
- Area of search: Somerset
- Interest: Geological
- Notification date: 1992

Thrupe Lane Swallet (grid reference ST603458) is a 0.5 hectares (1.2 acres) geological Site of Special Scientific Interest in Somerset, notified in 1992. It is also a Geological Conservation Review site.

The name Thrupe Lane comes from the nearby hamlet of Thrupe, which in Anglo-Saxon meant dairy farm.

The swallet is a small, single pothole cave system that is dominated by a series of deep (117 metres (384 ft)) and mainly vertical passages, which follow fault lines, natural joints in the rock and mineral veins. It shows a form of cave development not seen elsewhere in the Mendips and contains the tallest vertical shaft in any known cave on the Mendip Hills, Atlas Pot, which is 60 metres (197 ft) deep. The stream that flows through the cave is one of those that feeds St Andrew's Wells in the grounds of the Bishop's Palace in Wells.

Thrupe Lane Swallet was first entered in 1974 following digging by three caving groups. The entry shaft has been blasted open to ensure a stable entrance.

== See also ==
- Caves of the Mendip Hills
