= Bos Swallet =

Cave in Somerset, England

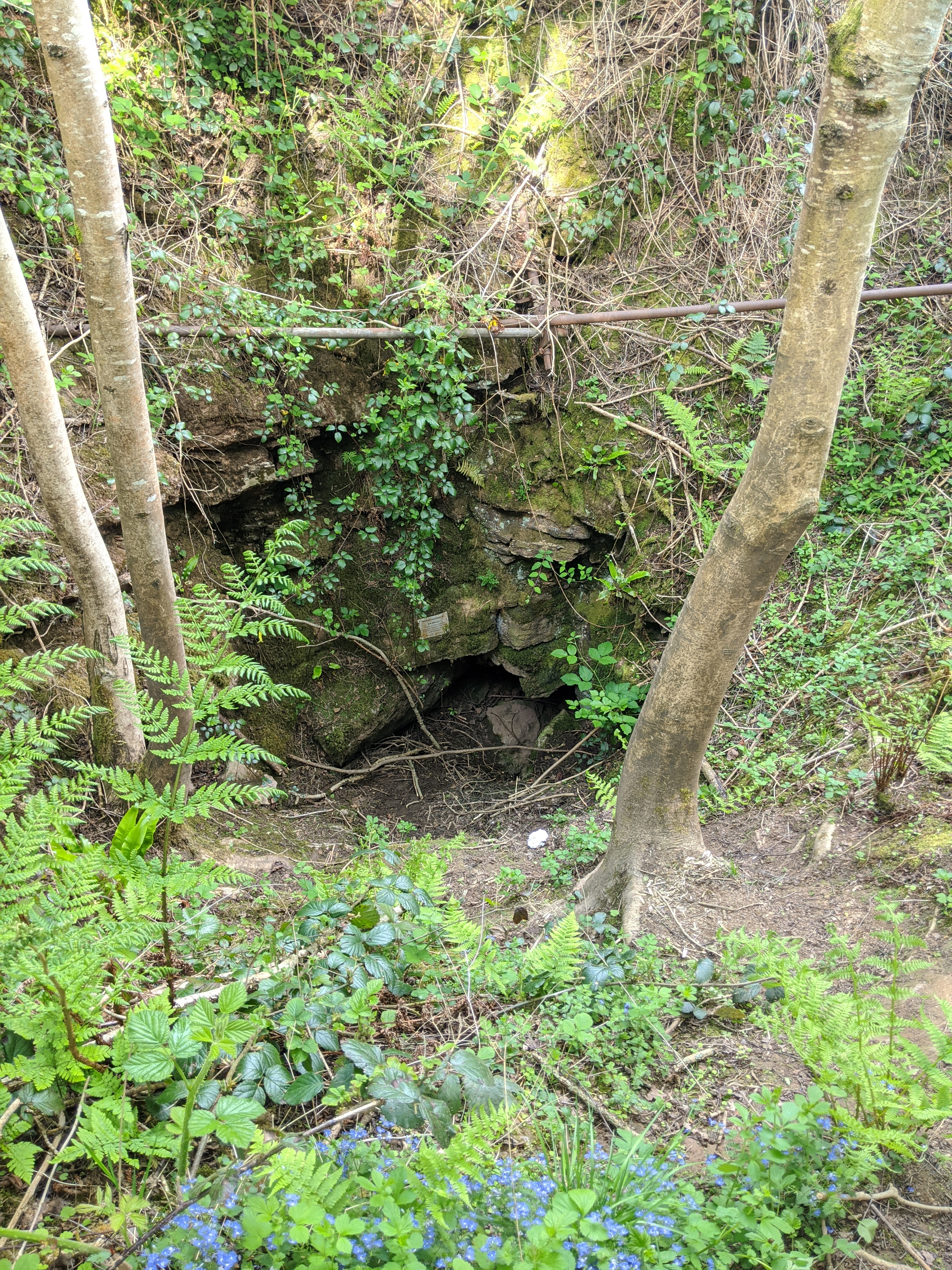
- Bos Swallet entrance

- Location within Somerset
- Location: Burrington Combe, Somerset, UK
- OS grid: ST 47086 58363
- Coordinates: 51°19′19″N 2°45′39″W
- Depth: 42 metres (138 ft)
- Length: 78 metres (256 ft)
- Discovery: 1946
- Geology: Limestone
- Entrances: 1
- Hazards
- Access: Free
- Registry: Mendip Cave Registry

Bos Swallet is a karst cave in Burrington Combe on the Mendip Hills in Somerset, England.

It is noted for being rather steep, with a length of 78 metres (256 ft) and a depth of 42 metres (138 ft).

The cave was first discovered by schoolboys from the nearby Sidcot School in mid-1947, where they noticed the presence of "bone, flints, and pottery" which was later the site of archeological investigation, and multiple attempts to dig out the cave from 1985 to 1995 which turned up with minimal results.

== See also ==
- Caves of the Mendip Hills
