= Charterhouse, Somerset =

Hamlet in Somerset, England

Coordinates: 51.2986°N 2.7221°W

Charterhouse
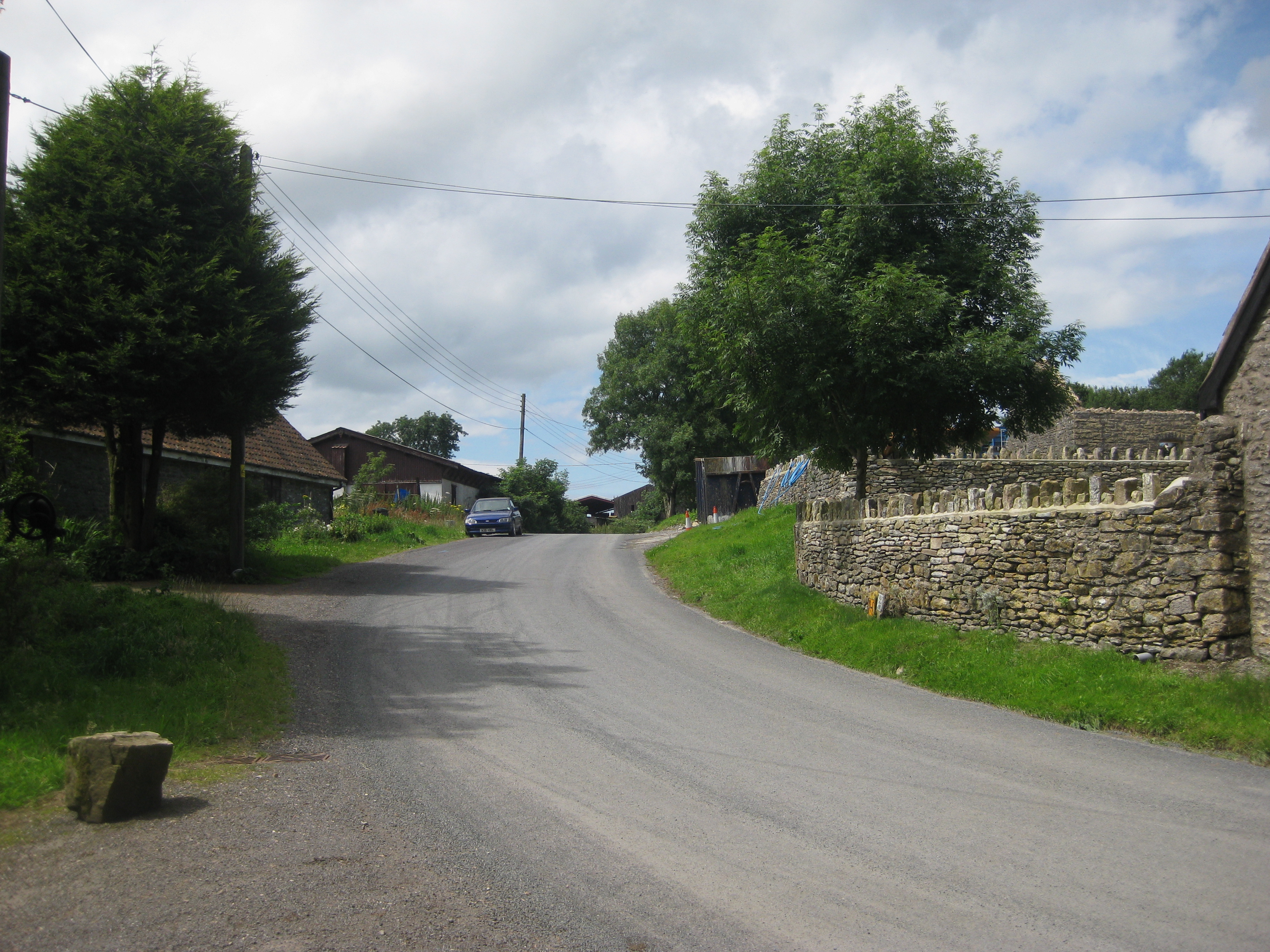
- Charterhouse, looking west

- Location within Somerset
- OS grid reference: ST497557
- Civil parish: Priddy
- Unitary authority: Somerset Council
- Ceremonial county: Somerset
- Region: South West
- Country: England
- Sovereign state: United Kingdom
- Post town: BRISTOL
- Postcode district: BS40
- Dialling code: 01761
- Police: Avon and Somerset
- Fire: Devon and Somerset
- Ambulance: South Western
- UK Parliament: Wells and Mendip Hills

Charterhouse, also known as Charterhouse-on-Mendip, is a hamlet and former civil parish, now in the parish of Priddy, in the Mendip Hills Area of Outstanding Natural Beauty (AONB) in the Somerset district, in the ceremonial county of Somerset, England. The area between Charterhouse and Cheddar Gorge including Velvet Bottom and Ubley Warren is covered by the Cheddar Complex Site of Special Scientific Interest. In 1931 the parish had a population of 68.

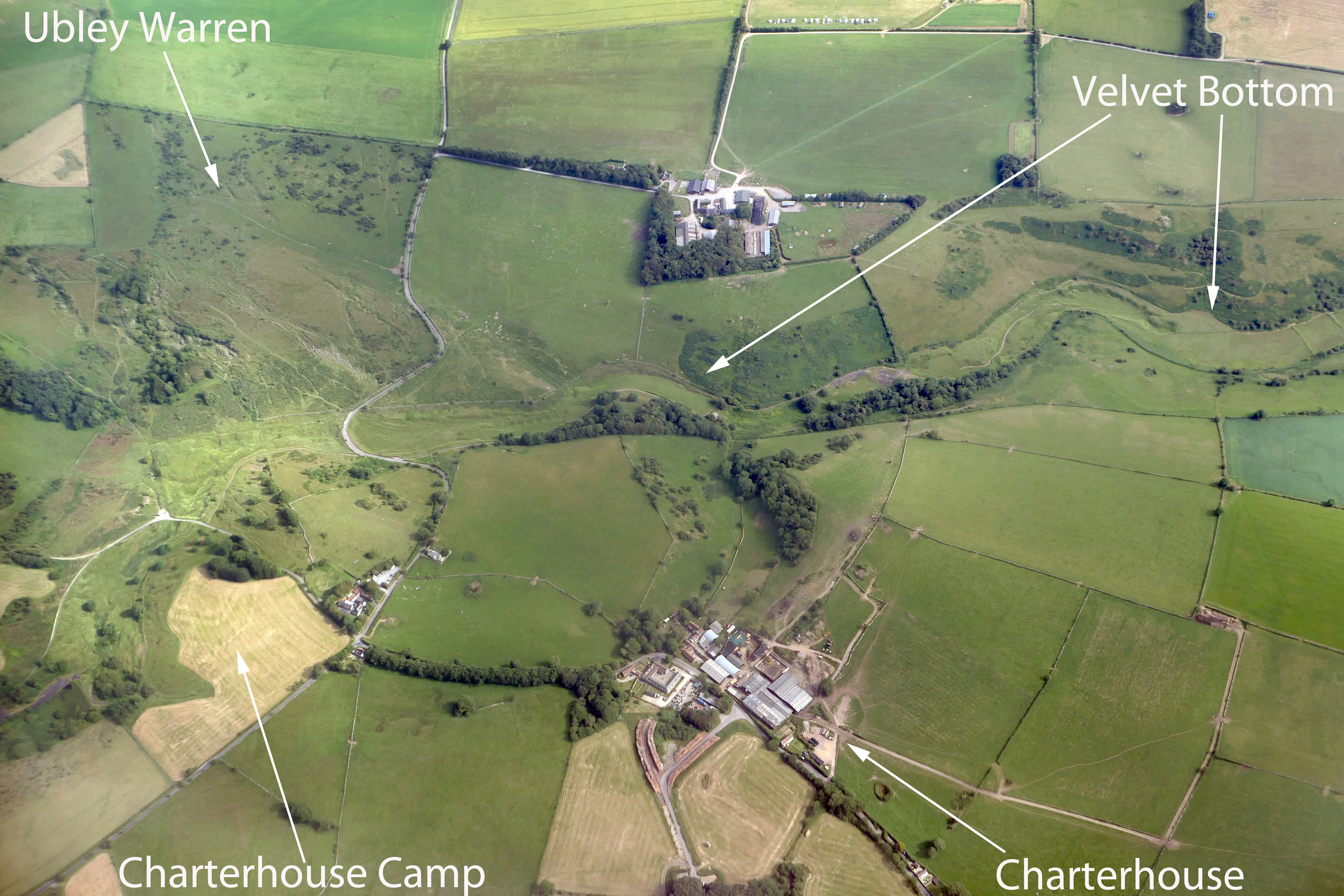

== Name ==
The name is believed to come from the Carthusian order of Chartreuse in France, which was established in Witham (near Frome) in 1181 and formed a cell at Charterhouse in 1283 with a grant to mine lead ore.

== History ==
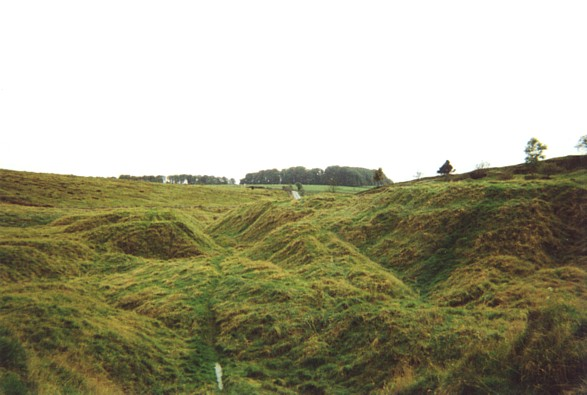
Roman lead mines at Charterhouse

There is evidence, in the form of burials in local caves, of human occupation since the late Neolithic/Early Bronze Age. A 2024 study of bones from a mass grave found in caves at Charthouse Warren in the 1970s suggests that 37 people were massacred in a violent cannibalistic event occurring between 2200-2000 BC.

The lead and silver mines at Charterhouse were first operated on a large scale by the Romans, from at least AD 49. At first the lead/silver industries were tightly controlled by the Roman military, but within a short time the extraction of these metals was contracted out to civilian companies, probably because the silver content of the local ore was not particularly high. There was also some kind of 'fortlet' here in the 1st century, and an amphitheatre. The Roman landscape has been designated as a Scheduled Ancient Monument.

The parish was part of the Winterstoke Hundred.

Charter-House-on-Mendip was an extra-parochial ville, from 1858 Charterhouse was a civil parish in its own right, on 1 April 1933 the parish was abolished and merged with Blagdon and Cheddar.

After the Dissolution of the Monasteries, it was granted to Robert May who constructed a substantial house here and one of his descendants John May became High Sheriff of Somerset in 1602.

There is further evidence of mine workings in the medieval and Victorian periods, some of which survives within the Blackmoor Nature Reserve owned by Somerset County Council. There is also evidence of a rectangular medieval enclosure.

== Caves ==
There are several caves in the limestone around the village including Manor Farm Swallet and Upper Flood Swallet.

== Church ==
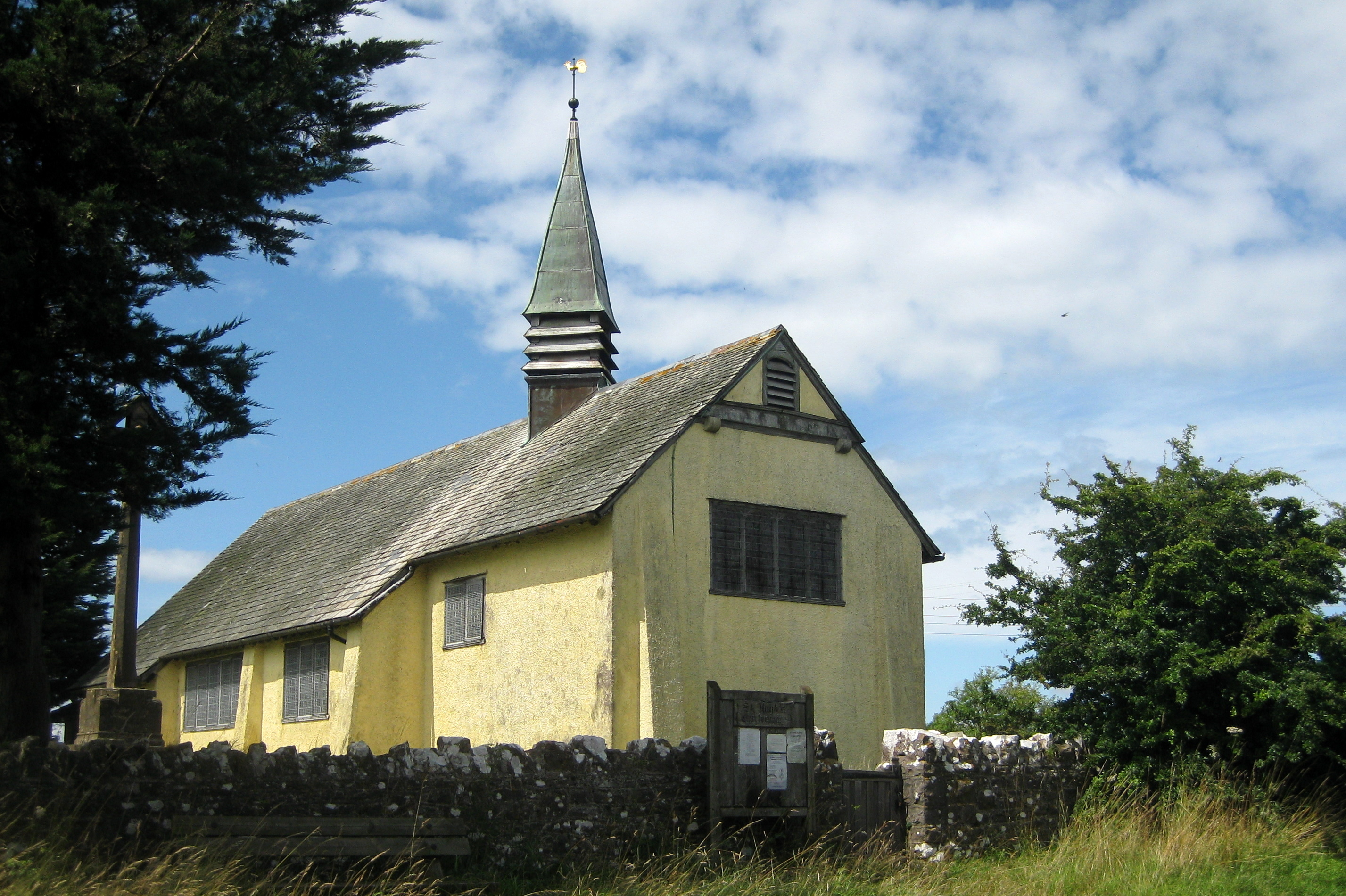
Church of St Hugh, Charterhouse

The Church of St Hugh was built in 1908 by W.D. Caroe, on the initiative of the Rev. Menzies Lambrick, from the former welfare hall for the lead miners. It is a Grade II* listed building. A cross in the churchyard and the churchyard wall are also listed buildings.

The roof-truss, screen, rood, and altar are all made of carved whitened oak.
