= Cheddar Complex =

Site of Special Scientific Interest in Somerset, England

- Site of Special Scientific Interest
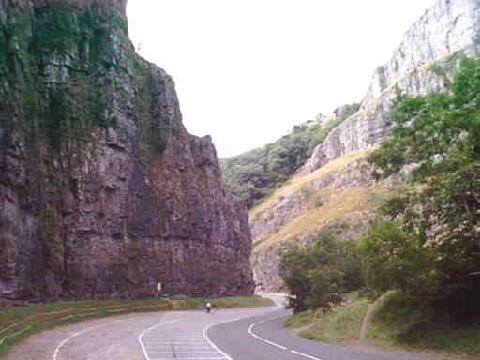

- Location within Somerset
- Location of Cheddar Complex.
- Area of search: Somerset
- Grid reference: ST465538
- Coordinates: 51.28082°N 2.76844°W
- Interest: Biological and Geological
- Area: 441.3 hectares (4.413 km^{2}; 1.704 sq mi)
- Notification date: 1952

The Cheddar Complex is a 441.3-hectare (1,090-acre) biological Site of Special Scientific Interest near Cheddar around the Cheddar Gorge and north east to Charterhouse in the Mendip Hills, Somerset, England, notified in 1952.

The very large area includes 4 SSSIs formerly known as: Cheddar Gorge SSSI; August Hole/Longwood Swallet SSSI; GB Cavern Charterhouse SSSI; and Charterhouse on-Mendip SSSI.

It is part owned by the National Trust, commercial landowners including the Marquess of Bath's Longleat Estate; and part managed by the Somerset Wildlife Trust.

== Biological ==
The Cheddar Complex supports a wide range of semi-natural habitats which includes unimproved grassland, calcareous dry dwarf-shrub heath, semi-natural broadleaved woodland and dense and scattered scrub. Four nationally rare plants are present, including Little Robin Geranium purpureum, Cheddar Pink Dianthus gratianopolitanus and Cheddar Bedstraw Galium fleurotii, two of which are endemic to the Cheddar area, as well as fifteen nationally scarce species.

== Geological ==
This site is important for karst, caves and vertebrate palaeontology and comprises four single interest localities. Cheddar Gorge is Britain’s largest gorge and probably the country’s best known limestone feature. It is a spectacular fluvial feature with a geomorphic history extending back 2 million years and encompassing the major environmental changes of the Pleistocene period. Cheddar Caves contain both active and fossil systems. The active cave system is one of the most heavily studied karst systems in Britain with reference to the conduit and diffuse flow characteristics of its hydrology. Charterhouse Caves include four major swallet caves that provide an indisputable record of Pleistocene landform development in the Mendips and surrounding area. Sun Hole Cave provides a varied fauna radiocarbon-dated to the end of the Late Devensian Cold Stage.

Several types of limestone including Clifton Down Limestone, Cheddar Limestone and Cheddar Oolite are visible in the Gorge and surrounding areas with pale grey Burrington Oolite outcropping around Black Rock Gate.

The Charterhouse area is of great importance as the finest remaining example of the unique Lead orefields of the Mendips. The surface features derived from lead working from pre-Roman times up to the nineteenth century are extremely well preserved.

== Somerset Wildlife Trust Reserves ==
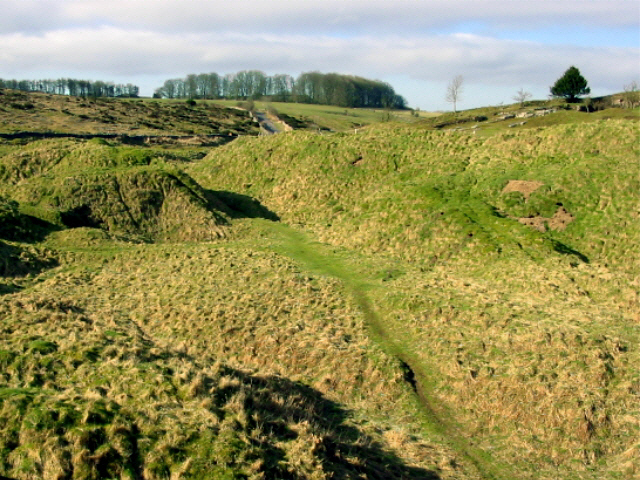
The site of old mining works in Velvet Bottom

The area includes several nature reserves run by the Somerset Wildlife Trust. These include: Black Rock, Bubworth Acres, GB Gruffy, Long Wood, Mascall's Wood, Middledown, Ubley Warren and Velvet Bottom.

The Black Rock reserve covers 181 acres (73 ha) of woodland, limestone grassland, conifers and an abandoned quarry. Long Wood covers 47 acres (19 ha) of ancient woodland and includes Longwood Swallet. It was historically the property of the Carthusian monks of Witham Charterhouse. In Roman times Velvet Bottom was mined for lead and the remains of circular buddle pits which were used to wash lead ore and settling beds can still be seen. Heaps of black shiny slag are the remains from re-smelting of the lead. It now consists of rough grassland, with areas of woodland and shrubs. GB Gruffy includes 17 acres (6.9 ha) of neutral to acid species-rich grassland which overlies the GB Cave system. The 86 acres (35 ha) of Ubley Warren are another site deeply affected by the lead mining in the area which lasted until the 19th century.

== See also ==
- List of Sites of Special Scientific Interest in Somerset
- Caves of the Mendip Hills
