= Priddy Caves =

Caves in Somerset, England

- Site of Special Scientific Interest
- Location within Somerset
- Location of Priddy Caves.
- Area of search: Somerset
- Grid reference: ST540505
- Coordinates: 51.2518°N 2.6605°W
- Interest: Geological
- Area: 67.6 hectares (0.676 km^{2}; 0.261 sq mi)
- Notification date: 1965

Priddy Caves (grid reference ST540505) is an Area: 67.6 hectare (167.0 acre) geological Site of Special Scientific Interest at Priddy in the Mendip Hills, Somerset, notified in 1965.

The entrance to St Cuthbert's Swallet is incorporated in the adjacent Priddy Pools SSSI. The Priddy Caves System contains about 16 km of surveyed cave passages divided between a number of major and minor networks. All the caves are sink hole systems, fed by sink holes at the ground surface. In all the caves, the detailed disposition and form of the passages can be seen clearly to have followed marked lines of natural weakness in the rocks.

The three largest networks, Swildon's Hole, St Cuthbert's Swallet and Eastwater Cavern exceed 100 metres in depth. Swildon's Hole is a world-famous example of a shallow depth phreatic cave, which shows a very well developed dendritic pattern of drainage and contains extensive clastic and stalagmite fills. Hunter's Hole is an excellent example of a shaft complex draining a closed depression. This cave differs from the others at Priddy in apparently not having formed as a stream swallet. Cave sediments found within the systems, together with the information which can be deduced from the physical form of the caves, provide geologists with the means to obtain a better understanding of the geological evolution of southern Britain during the ice ages.
