= Manor Farm Swallet =

Cave in Somerset, England

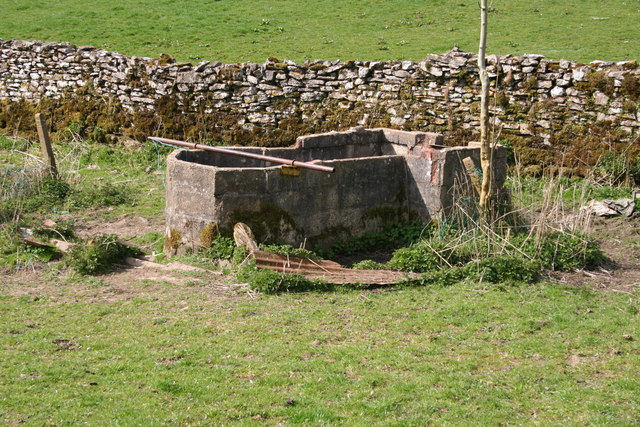
- The entrance to Manor Farm swallet

- Location within Somerset
- Location: Somerset, UK
- OS grid: ST 4982 5566
- Coordinates: 51°17′52″N 2°43′16″W
- Depth: 179 metres (587 ft)
- Length: 1,107 metres (3,632 ft)
- Elevation: 233 metres (764 ft)
- Discovery: 1972
- Geology: Limestone
- Access: Public
- BRAC grade: 2
- Registry: Mendip Cave Registry

Manor Farm Swallet is a cave in the limestone of the Mendip Hills, in Somerset, England which was subject to numerous failed digging attempts between 1947 and 1973 as the surface shafts kept collapsing. In 1973 access to the cave was gained by an artificial shaft and walling it against collapse.
