= Priddy =

Village in Somerset, England

Coordinates: 51.2543°N 2.6771°W

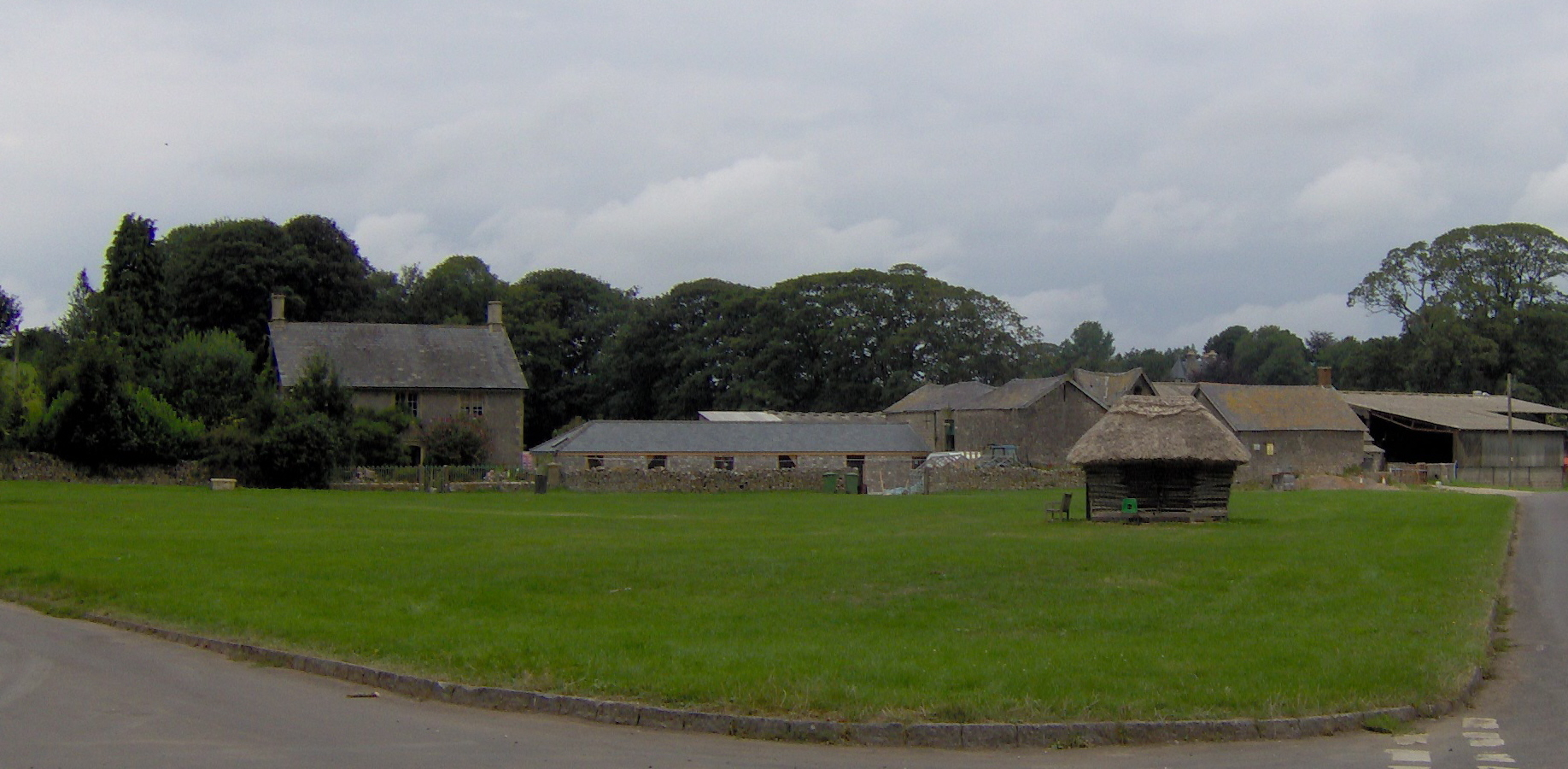
- Priddy Green

- Location within Somerset
- Population: 624 (2011)
- OS grid reference: ST527508
- Unitary authority: Somerset Council
- Ceremonial county: Somerset
- Region: South West
- Country: England
- Sovereign state: United Kingdom
- Post town: WELLS
- Postcode district: BA5
- Dialling code: 01749
- Police: Avon and Somerset
- Fire: Devon and Somerset
- Ambulance: South Western
- UK Parliament: Wells and Mendip Hills

Priddy is a village in Somerset, England in the Mendip Hills, close to East Harptree and 4 miles (6 km) north-west of Wells.

The village lies in a small hollow near the summit of the Mendip range of hills, at an elevation of 260 metres (850 ft) above sea-level, and has evidence of occupation since Neolithic times. There are remains of lead mining activities and caves in the limestone beneath the village.

It is the venue for the annual Priddy Folk Festival. The Sheep Fair, was last held in 2013.

== Toponymy ==
It is generally agreed among toponymic specialists that the first element of Priddy is most likely to be a British (ie pre-English) word, pridd, and various forms thereof, with a general sense of 'mud, earth, clay, soil'. Despite many claims to the contrary, the second element of the toponym is entirely unknown, despite attempts to resolve it - this is in large measure due to the lack of reliable early spellings. Albert Thompson's meticulous deconstruction of the landscape archaeology of Priddy and its environs is, however, an extremely valuable, important and authoritative contribution to this debate, and to overall knowledge in this respect. However, many years ago, A G C Turner suggested that Priddy contained a second pre-English element which gave a sense to the whole place-name of 'the earth house(s)'; but he did not develop his idea any further, or make any suggestion about what feature or features were being referenced. Much more recently though, Andrew Breeze has taken up Turner's idea and suggested that the 'earth house(s)' might be a reference to the numerous Bronze Age barrows which lie close to Priddy, most notably the celebrated Nine Barrows, and the separate Ashen Hill Group. British speakers of the early medieval period, prior to the widespread adoption of English in northern Somerset, would have known perfectly well that these were burial mounds, and may therefore have rationalised them as 'houses' of the dead. There certainly seems to have been a very similar kind of empathetic appreciation for prehistoric monuments of all kinds, among rather later, Anglo-Saxon folk.

== History ==
In 1977 a Mesolithic hut site was excavated at Priddy. Nearby are the Priddy Circles a stone circle or henge monument, which appears to be contemporary with Stonehenge, i.e. Neolithic circa 2180 BC. The North Hill location of two round barrow cemeteries, Ashen Hill and Priddy Nine-Barrows which are neighbours of the Circles, would seem to imply that the area to the north-east of Priddy held ritual significance into the Bronze Age. South of the village at Deer Leap is a Bronze Age burial mound and the remains of a medieval settlement of Ramspit. Drove Cottage Henge is a Neolithic ceremonial location to the east of the village.

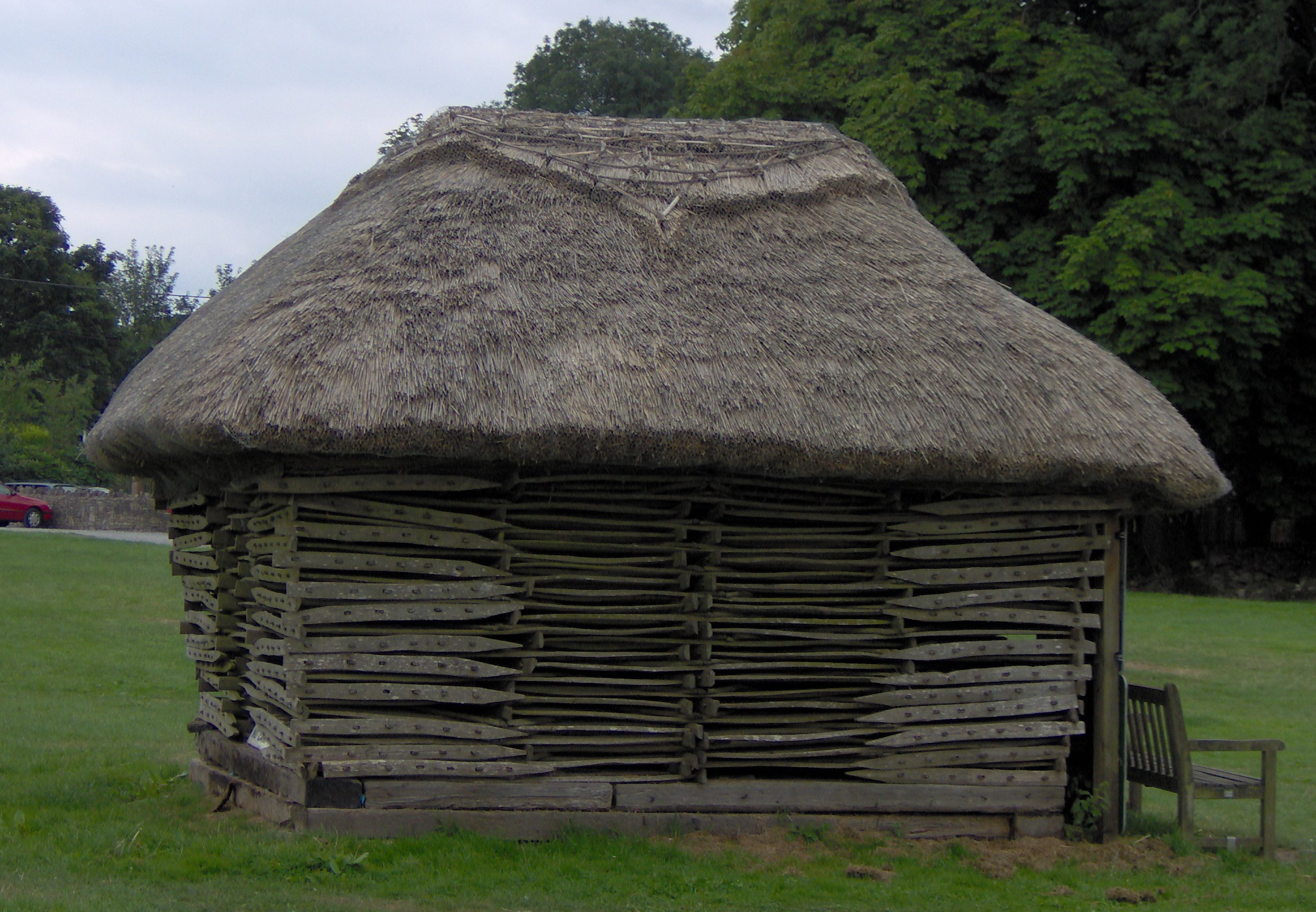
Hurdles at Priddy. No longer used but, it is said if they ever go the sheep fair will not be held again.

Lead was being worked as far back as 300 to 200 BC. The area east and north-west of the village shows extensive patches of "gruffy ground". The word "gruffy" derives from the grooves that were formed where the lead ore was extracted from veins near the surface. The relatively easy opencast extraction of lead was a strong attraction for the Romans. Lead ingots found in the neighbourhood have been dated to AD 49. The ruins of St Cuthbert's Leadworks which closed in 1908 can still be seen. According to tradition Joseph of Arimathea and the young Jesus stayed at Priddy when they came to Somerset. It has been proposed that Joseph was a trader of Cornish tin and of the lead and copper of Somerset.

Although the village is not mentioned in the Domesday Book it appears to be the subject of a lost Saxon charter of the late 7th or 8th century. The parish was part of the hundred of Wells Forum.

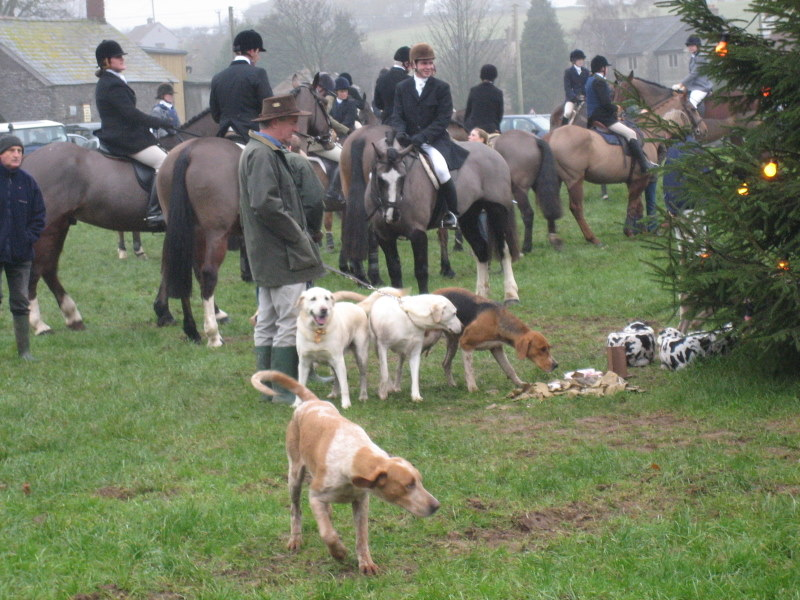
Mendip Farmers' Hunt Boxing Day meeting

Since the 1920s, the kennels for the Mendip Farmers' Hunt fox hounds have been based near the village, but the hunt was planning to relocate them to Chewton Mendip, a move which has faced significant local opposition. The group starts a number of fox hunts from the village green, including one on Boxing Day. In 2014 a decision was made by Mendip District Council to allow the development of the kennels in the village.

In April 2013 the stack of sheep hurdles on the green was set alight in an arson attack. In July 2013, locals remade The Hurdles.

An annual Sheep Fair began in the village in 1348, moving from Wells as a result of the Black Death. It was last held in 2013. The parish council and sheep fair committee cancelled the 2014 event, describing it as unsustainable. The parish council dissolved the organising Sheep Fair Committee in July 2016.

== Governance ==
The parish council has responsibility for local issues, including setting an annual precept (local rate) to cover the council's operating costs and producing annual accounts for public scrutiny. The parish council evaluates local planning applications and works with the local police, district council officers, and neighbourhood watch groups on matters of crime, security, and traffic. The parish council's role also includes initiating projects for the maintenance and repair of parish facilities, as well as consulting with the district council on the maintenance, repair, and improvement of highways, drainage, footpaths, public transport, and street cleaning. Conservation matters (including trees and listed buildings) and environmental issues are also the responsibility of the council.

For local government purposes, since 1 April 2023, the parish comes under the unitary authority of Somerset Council. Prior to this, it was part of the non-metropolitan district of Mendip (established under the Local Government Act 1972). It was part of Wells Rural District before 1974.

It is also part of the Wells and Mendip Hills county constituency represented in the House of Commons of the Parliament of the United Kingdom. It elects one Member of Parliament (MP) by the first past the post system of election.

== Geography ==
Priddy Pools, a Site of Special Scientific Interest (SSSI), were originally formed when the Romans started mining lead in the area. Priddy Caves are also an SSSI with the entrance to Swildon's Hole at the centre of the village. Priddy Mineries is a Nature Reserve as is Chancellor's Farm. The other caves of the Mendip Hills in and around Priddy include: Eastwater Cavern, Hunter's Hole, St Cuthbert's Swallet, and Wigmore Swallet.

== Religion ==
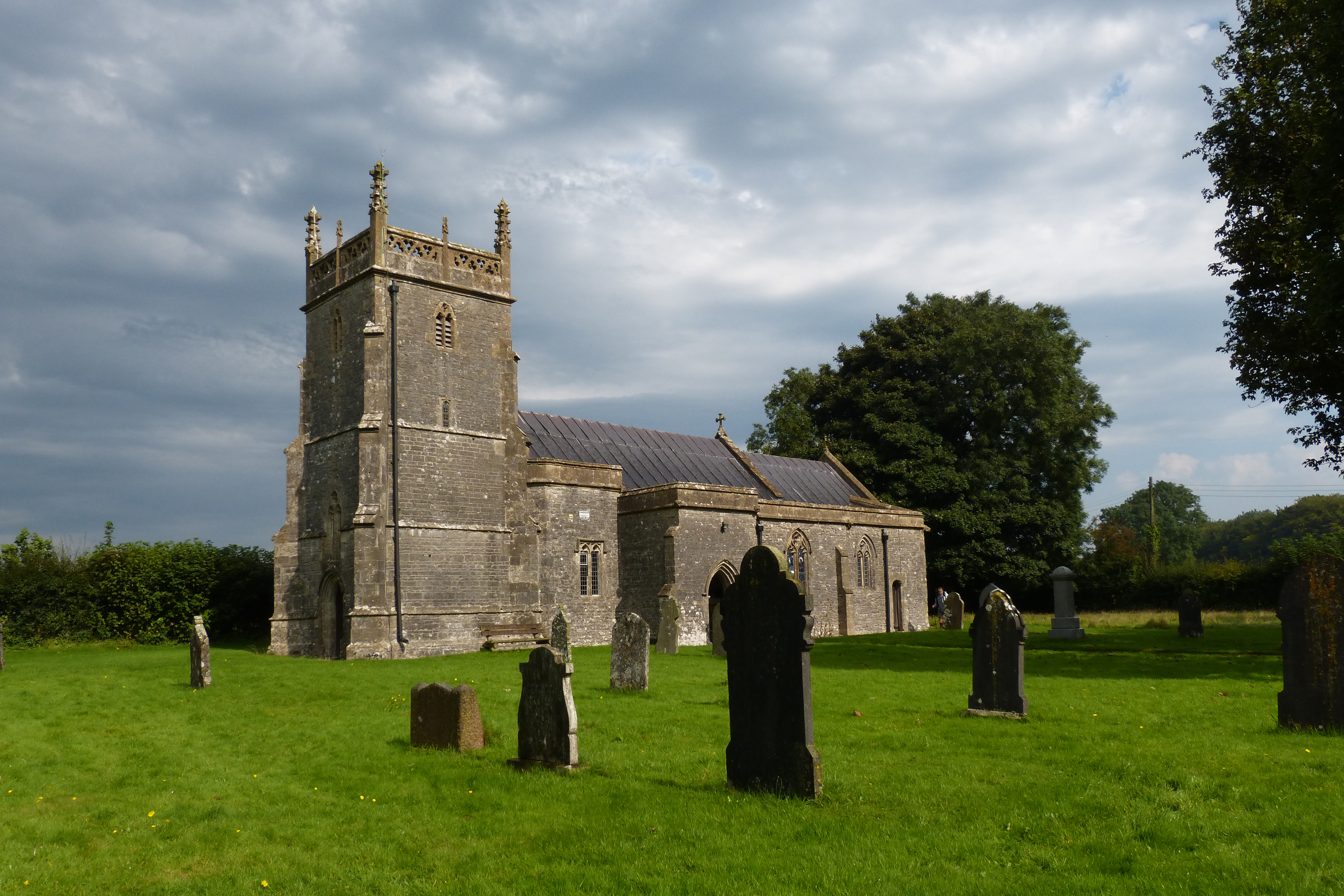
St Lawrence's Church at Priddy

The Church of St Lawrence dates from the 13th century, with some rebuilding in the 15th century and was restored in 1881–1888; it is a Grade I listed building. The three bells in the church were augmented to five in 1997. The church includes a medieval altar frontal.

On 29 October 2017 Metropolitan Seraphim (of the British Orthodox Church) consecrated Father David Seeds as Bishop David of Priddy.
