= Mendip Hills =

Range of limestone hills to the south of Bristol and Bath in Somerset, England

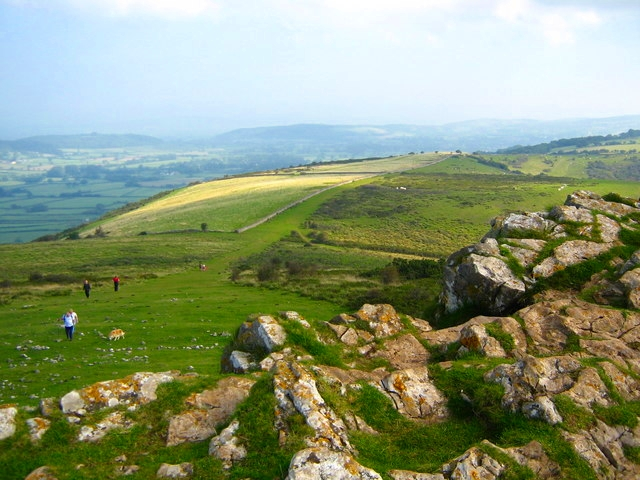
- The Mendip Hills as seen from Crook Peak near Compton Bishop

- Location within the United Kingdom
- Location: Somerset, England
- Coordinates: 51°18′N 2°44′W
- Length: 30 km (19 mi)
- Width: 10 km (6.2 mi)
- Area: 200 km^{2} (77 sq mi)
- Established: 1972
- Governing body: Mendip Hills AONB Partnership
- Website: www.mendiphillsaonb.org.uk

The Mendip Hills (commonly called the Mendips; /ˈmɛndɪp/) are a range of limestone hills to the south of Bristol and Bath in Somerset, England. Running from Weston-super-Mare and the Bristol Channel in the west to the Frome valley in the east, the hills overlook the Somerset Levels to the south and the Chew Valley and other tributaries of the Avon to the north. The highest point, at 325 metres (1,066 ft) above sea level, is Beacon Batch, which is the summit area atop Black Down. The hills gave their name to the former local government district of Mendip, which administered most of the area until April 2023. The higher, western part of the hills, covering 198 km^{2} (76 sq mi), has been designated an Area of Outstanding Natural Beauty (AONB), which gives it a level of protection comparable to a national park.

The hills are largely formed from Carboniferous Limestone, which is quarried at several sites. Ash–maple woodland, calcareous grassland and mesotrophic grassland, which can be found across the Mendip Hills, provide nationally important semi-natural habitats. With their temperate climate they support a range of flora and fauna including birds, butterflies and small mammals. The dry-stone walls that divide the pasture into fields are of botanical importance since they support important populations of the nationally scarce wall whitlowgrass (Draba muralis).

Mendip has seen human activity since Palaeolithic and Mesolithic times, with a range of artefacts being recovered from caves. Neolithic, Iron Age and Bronze Age features such as barrows are numerous with more than 200 scheduled ancient monuments recorded. There is evidence of mining in the Mendips dating back to the late Bronze Age, which increased after the Roman invasion, particularly for lead and silver around Charterhouse. The difficult conditions in the area were noted by William Wilberforce in 1789, which inspired Hannah More to begin her work on improving the conditions of the Mendip miners and agricultural workers. In the 18th and early 19th centuries 7,300 ha (18,000 acres) of the common heathland on the hills were enclosed. In World War II a bombing decoy was constructed on top of Black Down at Beacon Batch. More recently the mast of the Mendip transmitting station, micro-hydroelectric turbines and a wind turbine have been installed.

There are several quarries on the Mendip Hills. Some of the stone is still carried by Mendip Rail; the other railways in the area closed in the 1960s. Although the Roman Fosse Way crossed the hills, the main roads generally avoid the higher areas and run along the bottom of the scarp slope on the north and south of the hills. The western end of the hills is crossed by the M5 motorway and A38. Further east, and running almost north to south, are the A37 and A39. A wide range of outdoor sports and leisure activities takes place in the Mendips, many based on the geology of the area. The hills are recognised as a national centre for caving and cave diving, as well as being popular with climbers, hillwalkers and natural historians. Wookey Hole Caves and some of the caves in Cheddar Gorge are open as show caves; however many of the caves of the Mendip Hills are accessible only to members of caving clubs. Long-distance footpaths include the Mendip Way and Limestone Link.

== Toponymy ==
There has been a great deal of debate, over the course of decades if not centuries, about the provenance and meaning of the toponym 'Mendip', and as late as 2000 two leading place-name scholars felt able to remark that "Mendip is probably best regarded as unsolved". However an idea put forward in a 1986 paper by one of the UK's leading academic place-name researchers seems to have regrettably fallen beneath the radar and has not had the widespread currency that it deserves. The author of the article was Richard Coates, now Emeritus Professor of Linguistics at the University of the West of England. Following a review of earlier evidence Prof. Coates suggested that Mendip is a hybrid name, part British and part Old English. He posits a first element mönïð, from Primitive Welsh, meaning 'a hill', and Old English yppe, 'a hunting dais'. The strong sense of the word in its entirety is 'an upland area used for hunting'.

== Geology ==
The rock strata known as Carboniferous Limestone were laid down during the early Carboniferous Period, about 320–350 million years ago. Subsequently, much of northwestern Europe underwent continental collision throughout the late Paleozoic Era, culminating in the final phases of the Variscan orogeny near the end of the Carboniferous, 300 million years ago. This tectonic activity produced a complex suite of mountain and hill ranges across what is now southern Ireland, south-western England, Brittany, and elsewhere in western Europe.

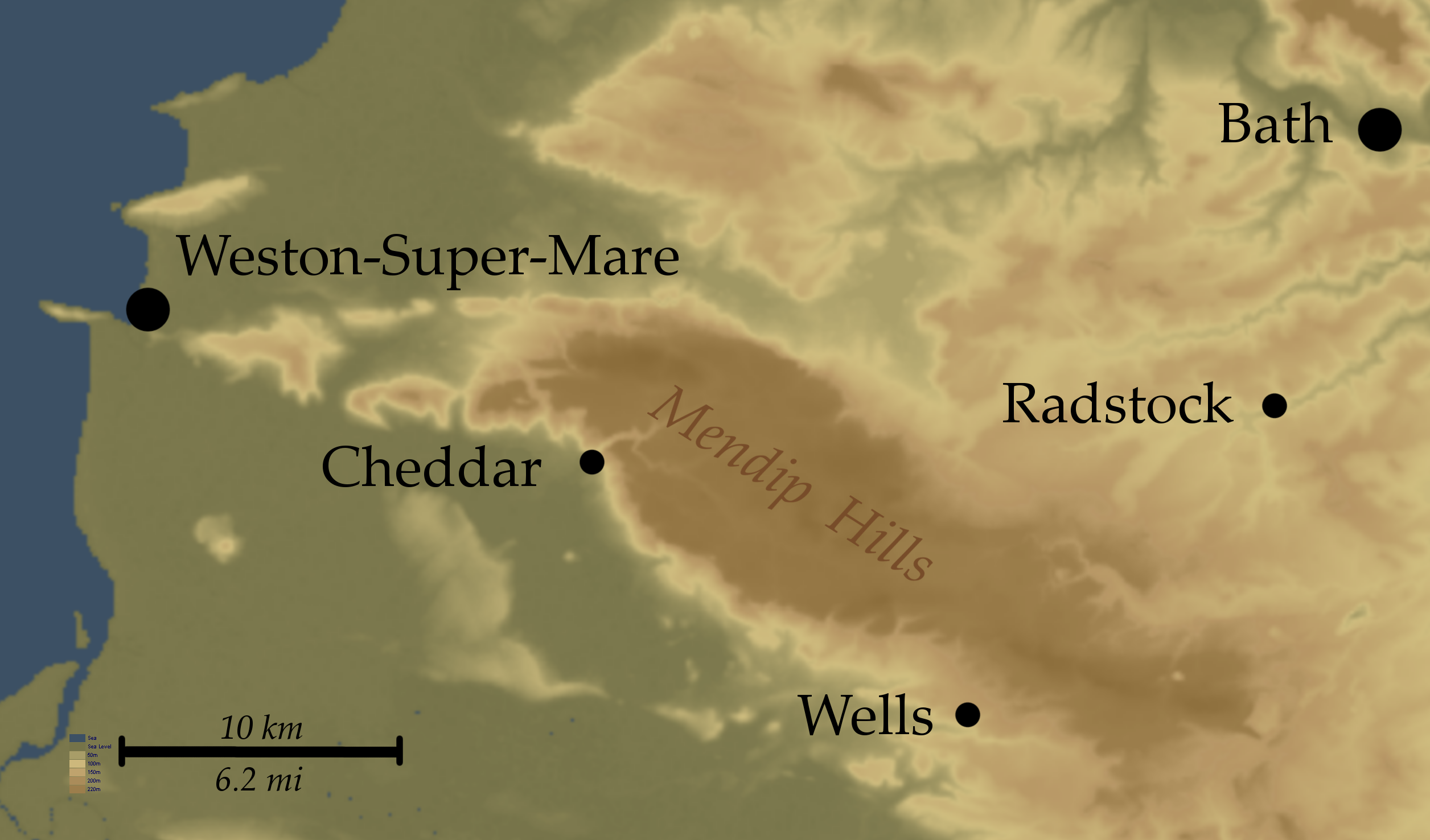
Topographic map of the Mendips

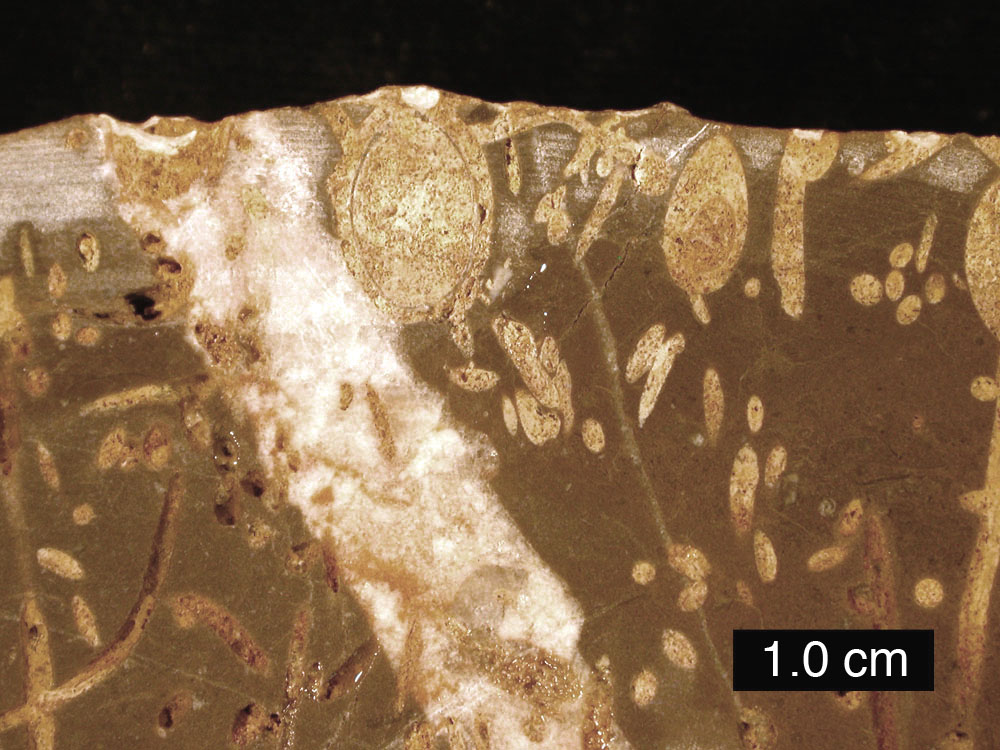
Cross-section of a Carboniferous Limestone bored by Jurassic organisms; borings include Gastrochaenolites (some with boring bivalves in place) and Trypanites; Mendip Hills; scale bar = 1 cm

As a result of the Variscan mountain-building, the Mendip area now comprises at least four anticlinal fold structures, with an east–west trend, each with a core of older Devonian sandstone and Silurian volcanic rocks. The latter are quarried for use in road construction and as a concrete aggregate. The Mendips were considerably higher and steeper 200 to 300 million years ago, and subsequent erosion has resulted in varying geological features including gorges, dry valleys, screes, swallets and others typical of karst landscapes. Beneath the southern escarpment and plateau are caves. There are also areas of limestone pavement and other karst features. Dissolution of the limestone produced many of the gorges including Cheddar Gorge and Burrington Combe. Springs are a common feature of the eastern part of the hills, a number of which have associated tufa deposits.

Black Down is a moorland area, with its steeper slopes covered in bracken (Pteridium) and its flatter summit in heather (Calluna) and grasses rather than the pasture which covers much of the plateau. The main body of the range is an extended plateau, 6–8 km (3.7–5.0 mi) wide and generally about 240 metres (790 ft) above sea level.

In some places lead and zinc ores have mineralised the limestone and the dolomitic conglomerate. From the time of Roman Britain until 1908, the hills were an important source of lead. These areas were the centre of a major mining industry in the past and this is reflected in areas of contaminated rough ground known locally as "gruffy". The word "gruffy" is thought to derive from the grooves that were formed where the lead ore was extracted from veins near the surface. Other commodities obtained included calamine (zinc ore), manganese, iron, copper and baryte. The eastern area reaches into parts of the Somerset Coalfield.

North and east of the Mendips the Carboniferous Limestone layers are found in the subsurface and are exposed in Avon Gorge, and are overlain by younger strata in Dundry Hill and the Cotswolds, where oolitic limestone of Jurassic age is found at the surface. West of the main Mendip plateau the Carboniferous Limestone continues in Bleadon Hill and Brean Down, and on the islands of Steep Holm and Flat Holm in the Bristol Channel.

The hills gave their name to the rare mineral mendipite, an oxohalide of lead with chlorine with formula Pb_{3}Cl_{2}O_{2} which was first described in the area. A sample of mendipite was found at the head of Ebbor Gorge.

== Climate ==
Along with the rest of South West England, the Mendip Hills have a temperate climate that is generally wetter and milder than the rest of England. The annual mean temperature is about 10 °C (50 °F) with seasonal and diurnal variations, but the modifying effect of the sea restricts the range to less than that in most other parts of the United Kingdom. January is the coldest month, with mean minimum temperatures between 1 and 2 °C (34 and 36 °F). July and August are the warmest, with mean daily maxima around 21 °C (70 °F). In general, December is the dullest month and June the sunniest. The south-west of England enjoys a favoured location, particularly in summer, when the Azores High extends its influence north-eastwards towards the UK.

Cumulus cloud often forms inland, especially near hills, and reduces exposure to sunshine. The average annual sunshine is about 1,600 hours. Rainfall tends to be associated with Atlantic depressions or with convection. In summer, convection caused by solar surface heating sometimes forms shower clouds, and a large proportion of the annual precipitation falls from showers and thunderstorms at this time of year. Average rainfall is around 800–900 mm (31–35 in). About 8–15 days of snowfall is typical. November to March have the highest mean wind speeds, with June to August having the lightest; the prevailing wind direction is from the south-west.

A combination of the rainfall and geology leads to an estimated average daily runoff from springs and boreholes of some 330,000 m^{3} (72 million imperial gallons). Bristol Waterworks Company (now Bristol Water) recognised the value of this resource and between 1846 and 1853 created a series of tunnels, pipes, and aqueducts called the "Line of Works", which still carry approximately 18,200 m^{3} (4 million imperial gallons) of water a day to Barrow Gurney Reservoirs for filtration and then on to Bristol and the surrounding areas. This collection and conveyance of water from the Chewton Mendip and East and West Harptree areas is accomplished by the effect of gravity on the runoff. Water from the Mendips is also collected in Cheddar Reservoir, which was constructed in the 1930s and takes water from the springs in Cheddar Gorge.

== Ecology ==
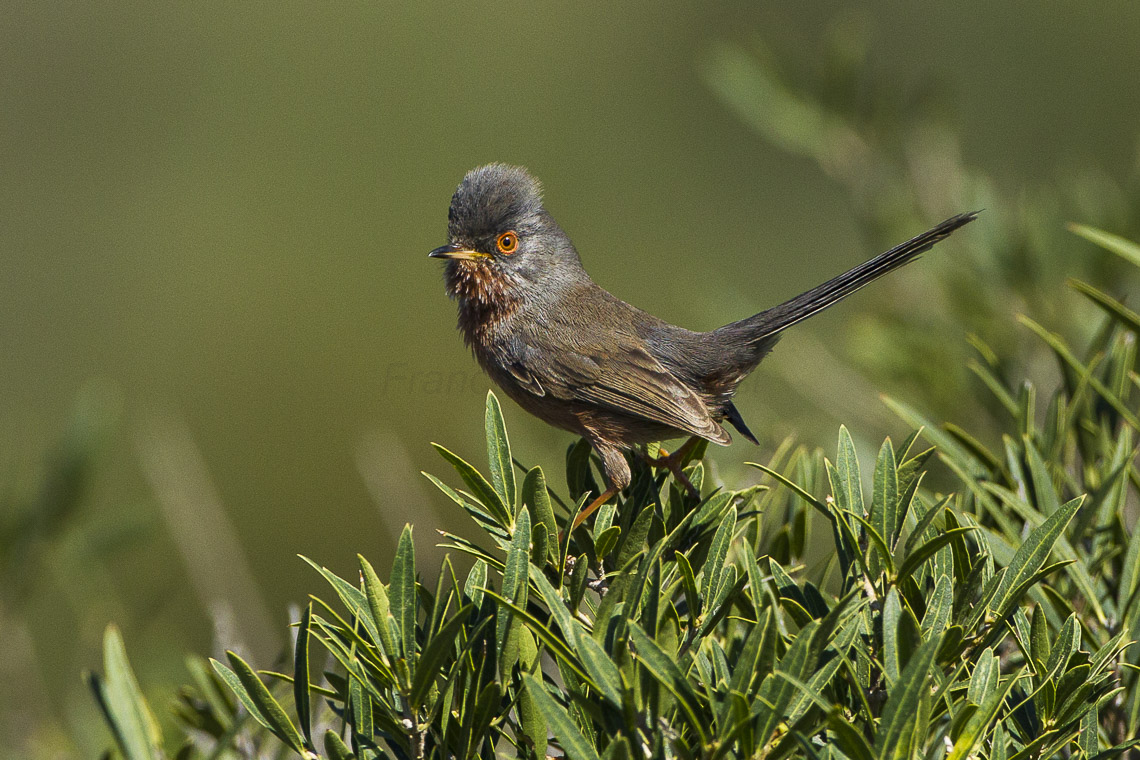
Male Dartford warbler

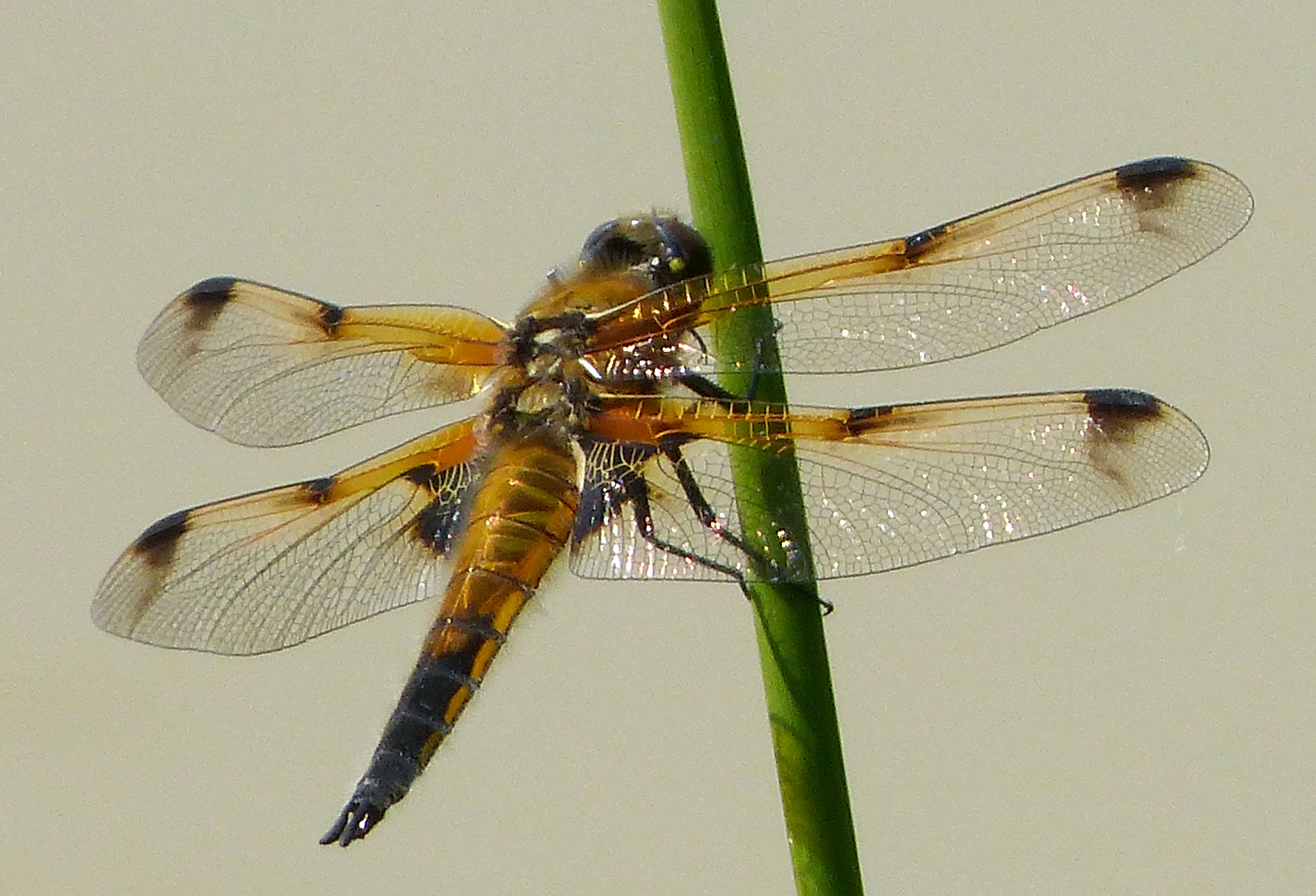
Four-spotted chaser

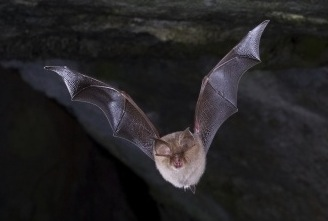
Lesser horseshoe bat

The area hosts three semi-natural habitats of national importance: ash–maple woodland (Fraxinus spp. and Acer spp.) often with abundant small-leaved lime (Tilia cordata), calcareous grassland and mesotrophic grassland.

Much of the Mendips is open calcareous grassland, supporting a wide variety of flowering plants and insects. Some parts are deciduous ancient woodland, and some have been used intensively for arable agriculture, particularly since World War I. As the demand for arable land in Britain declined, some areas were returned to grassland, but the use of fertilisers and herbicides has reduced biodiversity. Grazing by rabbits, sheep and cattle maintains the grassland habitat.

Of the many bird species found in the Mendips, the peregrine falcon (Falco peregrinus), which has gradually recolonised the area since the 1980s, is particularly significant. It breeds on sea and inland cliffs and on the faces of active and disused quarries. The upland heaths of the west Mendips have recently increased in ornithological importance due to colonisation by the Dartford warbler (Sylvia undata), which can be found at Black Down and Crook Peak. In Britain, this species is usually associated with lowland heath. The woodlands at Stock Hill are a breeding site for nightjars (Caprimulgus europaeus) and long-eared owls (Asio otus). The Waldegrave Pool, part of Priddy Mineries, is an important site for dragonflies, including downy emerald (Cordulia aenea) and four-spotted chaser (Libellula quadrimaculata). Waldegrave Pool is the only Mendip breeding site for downy emerald dragonflies. In 2007 the first confirmed sighting of a red kite (Milvus milvus) on the Mendips was made at Charterhouse.

A range of important small mammals are found in the area, including the hazel dormouse (Muscardinus avellanarius) and bats. The hazel dormouse is restricted largely to coppice woodland and scrub, while the bats, including the nationally rare lesser (Rhinolophus hipposideros) and greater horseshoe bats (Rhinolophus ferrumequinum), have a number of colonies in buildings, caves, and mines. A rare and endangered species, the greater horseshoe bat is protected under the Wildlife and Countryside Act 1981 and is listed in Annex II of the 1992 European Community Habitats Directive. Amphibians such as the great crested newt (Triturus cristatus) have a wide distribution across the Mendips and are often found in flooded disused quarries.

Several rare butterflies are indigenous to the area, including the nationally scarce pearl-bordered fritillary (Boloria euphrosyne), Duke of Burgundy (Hamearis lucina), and white-letter hairstreak (Satyrium w-album). The large blue butterfly (Maculinea arion) became extinct in the hills in the late 1970s. The white-clawed crayfish is also nationally rare and is a declining species with small populations in a tributary of the Mells River and the River Chew.

The dry stone walls that divide the pasture into fields are a well-known feature of the Mendips. Constructed from local limestone in an "A frame" design, the walls are strong yet contain no mortar; many have been neglected and allowed to disintegrate, or have been replaced or contained by a mix of barbed wire and sheep fencing. These dry-stone walls are of botanical importance as they support important populations of the nationally scarce wall whitlowgrass (Draba muralis). Amongst the plants which occur in the area are the Cheddar pink (Dianthus gratianopolitanus), purple gromwell (Lithospermum purpurocaeruleum), white rock-rose (Helianthemum apenninum), Somerset hair-grass (Koeleria vallesiana), and starved wood-sedge (Carex depauperata).

== History ==
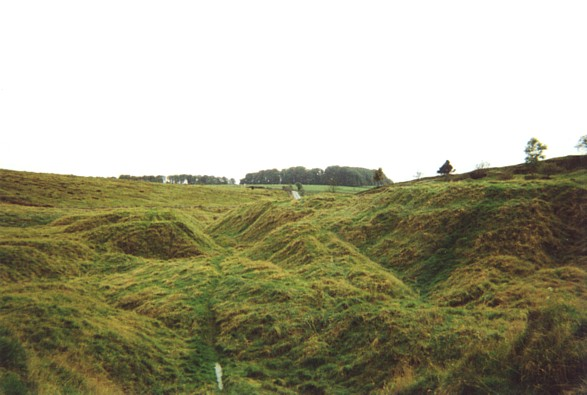
Roman lead mines at Charterhouse, Somerset

Twenty Palaeolithic sites have been identified in the Mendips, of which eleven represent faunal remains and lithic artefacts recovered from caves. The remaining eight sites refer to surface lithic discoveries, and the artefacts found include points, scrapers, and handaxes. Twenty-seven Mesolithic finds are represented by flint and chert lithics. Large numbers of artefacts have been found near Neolithic, Iron Age, and Bronze Age features, such as the barrows and forts around Priddy and at Dolebury Warren. The caves of Cheddar Gorge have yielded many archaeological remains, as flood waters have washed artefacts and bones into the caves and preserved them in silt. The Cheddar Man, Britain's oldest complete skeleton, was found in Gough's Cave, part of the Cheddar Complex.

Within the Mendip Hills AONB, good evidence exists for 286 definite examples of round barrows, including the Priddy Nine Barrows and Ashen Hill Barrow Cemeteries. The Historic England Archive holds over 1,200 entries for the area, and there are over 600 listed buildings, in addition to over 200 scheduled ancient monuments. These protected monuments range from prehistoric barrows and hillforts to the Black Down bombing decoy from the Second World War.

Settlement on the Mendip Hills appears to fall into two types. The first, apparent in the Neolithic and Bronze Age Britain periods, and repeated on a small scale in the Middle Ages and post-medieval era, comprised occupation by self-sufficient groups in small communities or isolated farms. The second was represented in the Iron Age Britain and Roman periods by large sites with specialist functions, existing by virtue of their ability to exert power over lowland producers. From the Iron Age onward the ownership of land took on increasing importance, with large landholdings based on the mines or on stock grazing, denying settlers access to the plateau or forcing them off the hills.

There is evidence of mining dating back to the late Bronze Age, when there were technological changes in metal-working indicating the use of lead. The Roman invasion, and possibly the preceding period of involvement in the internal affairs of the south of England, was inspired, in part, by the mineral wealth of the Mendips.

William Wilberforce's visit to Cheddar in 1789, during which he saw the poor circumstances of the locals, inspired Hannah More to begin her work improving the conditions of the Mendip miners and agricultural workers. Under her influence, schools were built and children were formally instructed in reading and Christian doctrine. Between 1770 and 1813 some 7,300 ha (18,000 acres) of land on the hills were enclosed, mainly with dry stone walls that today form a key part of the landscape. In 2006 funding was obtained to maintain and improve the walls, which had steadily deteriorated over the years.

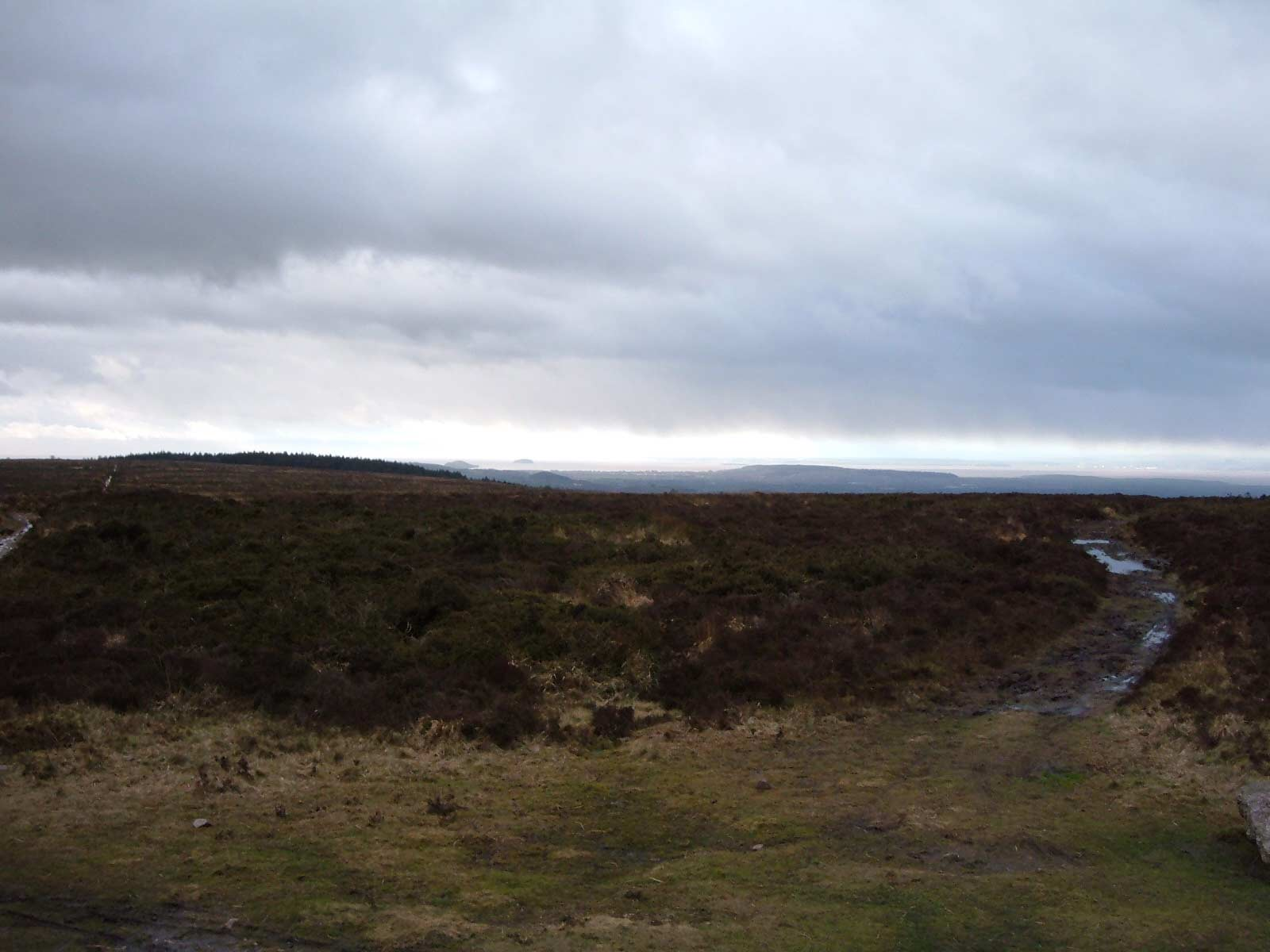
A view across Black Down from Beacon Batch, highest point in Mendip

=== 20th and 21st centuries ===
In World War II, a bombing decoy was constructed on top of Black Down at Beacon Batch in an attempt to confuse bombers aiming to damage the city of Bristol, and piles of stones (known as cairns) were created to prevent enemy aircraft using the hilltop as a landing site.

In the 1960s, the tallest mast in the region at 293 metres (961 ft) above ground level, the Mendip UHF television transmitter, was installed on Pen Hill near Wells, one of the highest points of the Mendips. The transmitter's antenna rises to about 589 metres (1,932 ft) above sea level.

Since 2003, arguments have raged over plans to erect a wind turbine near Chewton Mendip. The proposal was initially rejected by Mendip District Council, with the support of a range of local groups and organisations, on the grounds that the environmental impact on the edge of the AONB outweighed the amount of electricity which would be generated. In April 2006, however, a planning enquiry gave Ecotricity permission to build a 102 m (335 ft) turbine during the following year.

== AONB status ==
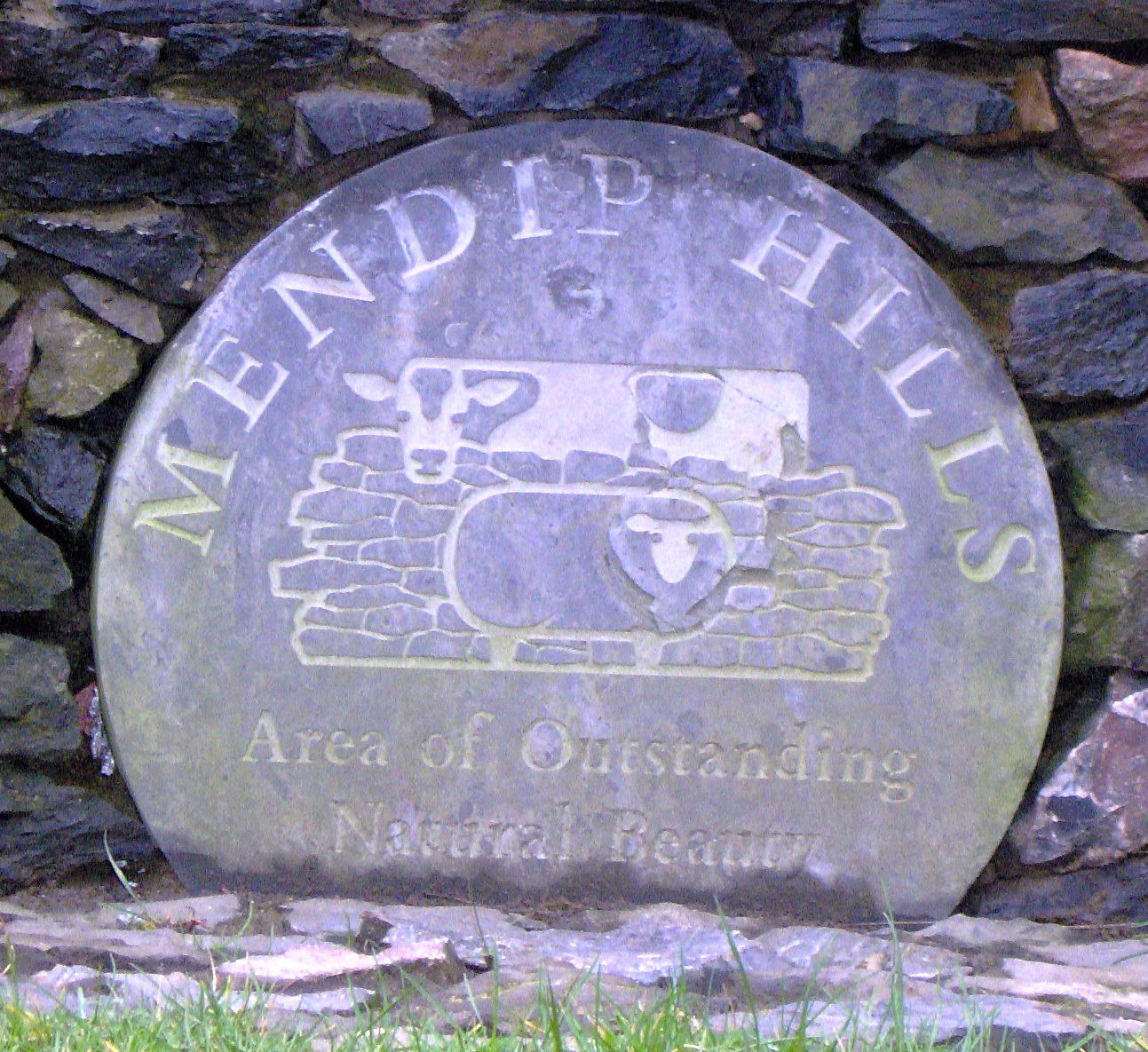
Logo of the Mendip Hills AONB at Burrington Combe

The western end of the Mendip Hills has, since 1972, been designated an Area of Outstanding Natural Beauty (AONB) under the National Parks and Access to the Countryside Act 1949. The Mendip Society, which was formed in 1965, helps to raise awareness of this designation and protect the area. The society runs a programme of guided walks and educational presentations. The society also has a small grants fund to assist communities with the conservation and enhancement of the landscape and to encourage its enjoyment and celebration.

As their landscapes have similar scenic qualities, AONBs may be compared to the national parks of England and Wales. In contrast to national parks, which have their own authorities and legal power to prevent unsympathetic development, very few statutory duties are imposed on the local authorities within an AONB. However, further regulation and protection of AONBs was added by the Countryside and Rights of Way Act 2000.

The Mendip Hills Partnership, which performs an administrative role, includes the five local authorities that cover the AONB, statutory bodies such as Natural England, together with parish councils and other organisations and groups that have an interest in the conservation and care of the area. The Mendip Hills AONB staff unit of the partnership is based at the Charterhouse Centre in the heart of the AONB. The AONB Unit consists of four staff: a manager, project officer, support officer and part-time planning officer and fixed term project officers. They are supported by volunteer rangers. In 2005 a proposal was submitted to the Countryside Agency to extend the Area of Outstanding Natural Beauty to Steep Holm and Brean Down in the west and towards Frome in the east.

Many of the villages on the Mendips have their own parish councils, which have some responsibility for local issues. Local people also elect councillors to district councils or to unitary authorities. The 198 km^{2} (76 sq mi) of the AONB are split across four districts: Mendip District Council 87.67 km^{2} (33.8 sq mi), Sedgemoor District Council 34.03 km^{2} (13.1 sq mi), Bath and North East Somerset Council 36.95 km^{2} (14.3 sq mi), and North Somerset Council 39.35 km^{2} (15.2 sq mi).

== Demographics ==
The population on the higher plateau is widely dispersed in small farms and hamlets, although rather than working in agriculture or forestry, most people now commute to employment in surrounding cities and towns. The largest village on the plateau on the western Mendips is Priddy, which had a population of 624 at the 2011 census along with the smaller hamlet of Charterhouse. The larger villages and towns are on the lower slopes of the western hills, often in river valleys. Axbridge, with a population of 2,057, and Cheddar (5,755), both within the Sedgemoor district, together with the Mendip town of Shepton Mallet (10,369) and the city of Wells (10,636) are along the southern border of the hills. The North Somerset parishes of Blagdon (1,116), and the parishes of Compton Martin (508), East Harptree (644) and West Harptree (439), lie along the northern edge.

Further east are the towns of Midsomer Norton and Radstock and the village of Paulton (population 5,302) within the unitary authority of Bath and North East Somerset.

== Transport and communications ==
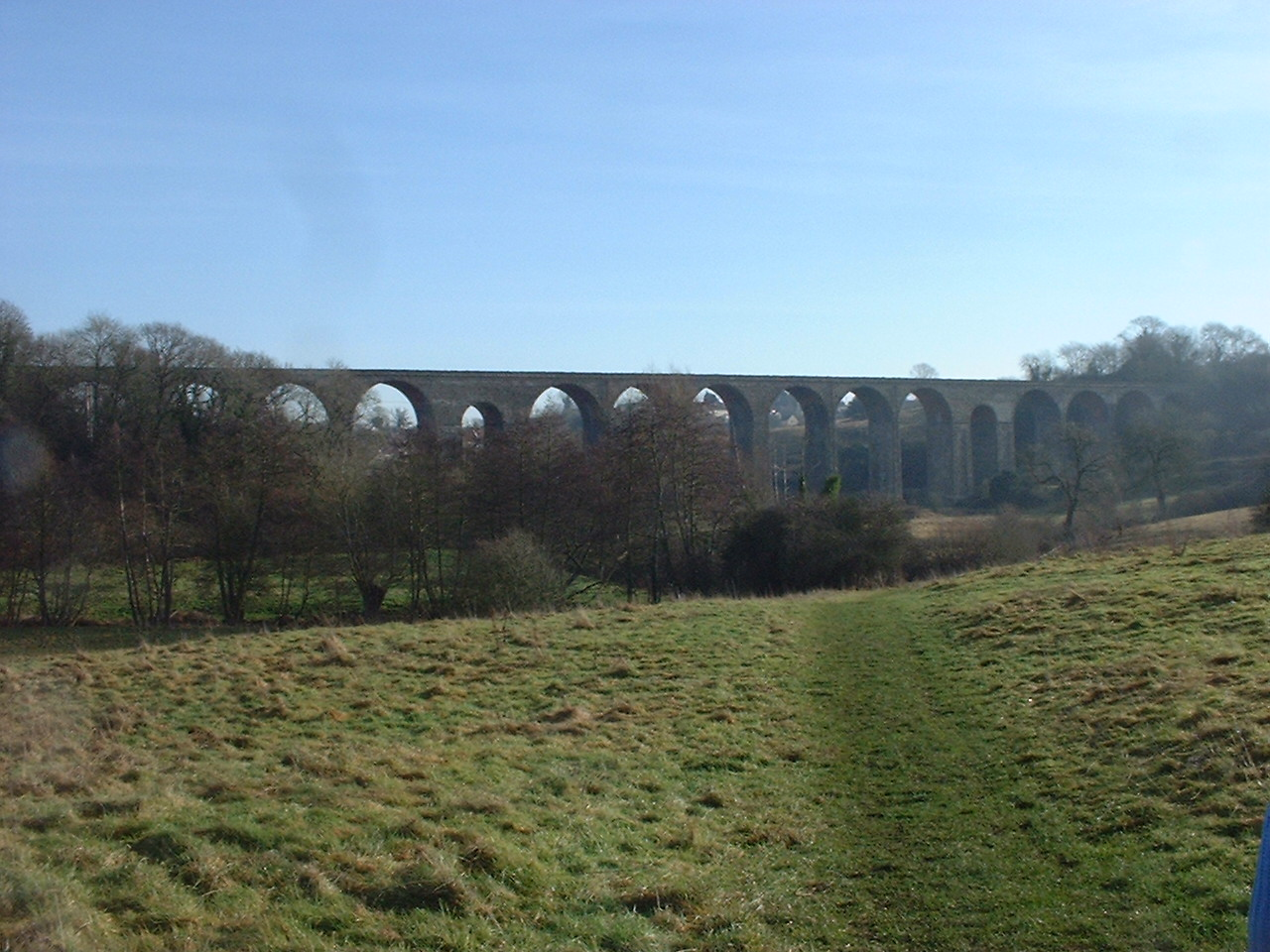
Pensford Viaduct (disused)

In the middle of the 1st century, ancient tracks across the hills were superseded by the Roman Fosse Way, from Bath to Ilchester, a branch of which served the Charterhouse lead mines. Stratton-on-the-Fosse and Lydford-on-Fosse, two villages of the Mendips, reflect the arrival of this new road. Much of the high plateau, however, remained uncultivated and unenclosed until the 18th century, resulting in many roads remaining as narrow winding lanes between high banks and hedges or stone walls. Where the tracks had their origins as drovers roads, they typically become open roads with wide verges. The roads tend to follow the line of gorges and valleys, as at Cheddar Gorge.

The major current roads avoid the highest areas of the hills. To the north of the western part of the Mendips, the A368 separates the hills from the Chew Valley, while on the southern edge the A371 similarly runs along the bottom of the scarp slope between the hills and the Somerset Levels. The western end of the hills is crossed by the M5 motorway with access at junctions 21 and 22, along with the A38. Further east, and running almost north to south, are the A37, A39, A36 and the A361.

During the late 19th and early 20th century, the Bristol and North Somerset Railway ran roughly parallel to the A37. Further south and west, the Cheddar Valley Line and Wrington Vale Light Railway, branches of the Bristol and Exeter Railway, served towns and villages from Cheddar to Wells. In the east, the Somerset and Dorset Joint Railway ran south from Bath into Dorset, and also served Wells. These have all now closed, but Mendip Rail has freight lines to carry limestone from the quarries of the Mendip Hills. There is also the East Somerset Railway which is an operational heritage railway. The Somerset Coal Canal reached some of the pits of the Somerset Coalfield in the eastern end of the Mendips.

== Quarrying ==
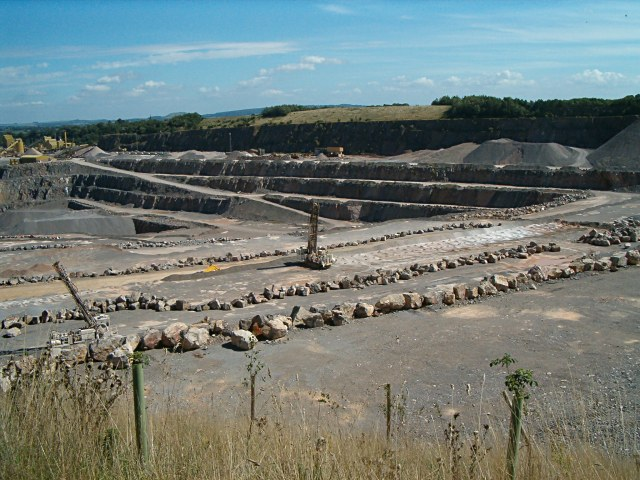
Western extension of Whatley Quarry

In recent centuries the Mendips, like the Cotswolds to the north, have been quarried for stone to build the cities of Bath and Bristol, as well as smaller towns in Somerset. The quarries are now major suppliers of road stone to southern England, among them producing around twelve million tonnes of limestone every year, employing over two thousand people, and turning over approximately £150 million per annum.

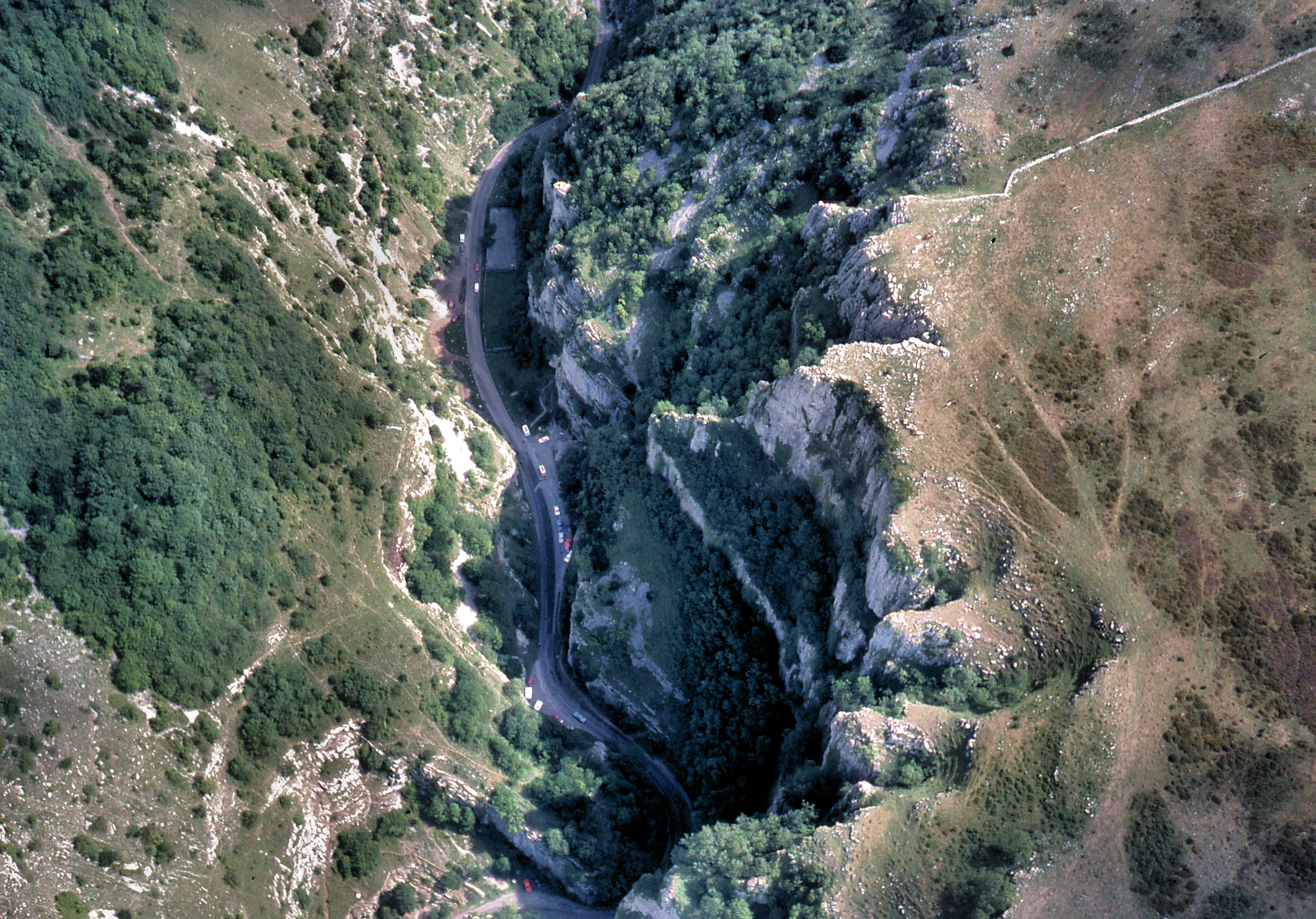
Part of Cheddar Gorge, seen from the air

There are two main rock types on the Mendips: the Devonian sandstones visible around Blackdown and Downhead and the Carboniferous Limestones, which dominate the hills and surround the older rock formations. There are nine active quarries and a host of disused sites, several of which have been designated as geological Sites of Special Scientific Interest by English Nature. Because of the effect quarrying has on the environment and local communities, a campaign has been started to halt the creation of any new quarries and to restrict the activities and expansion of the existing ones.

== Sport, leisure, and tourism ==
The Mendips are home to a wide range of outdoor sports and leisure activities, including hunting, caving, climbing, and abseiling. The rich variety of fauna and flora also makes it attractive for hillwalking and those interested in natural history.

=== Mendip Activity Centre ===
Mendip Activity Centre is set in the Mendip Hills and is one of the largest outdoor activity centres in the South West. It is a key part of the local tourism community bringing significant revenue and visitor numbers each year, welcoming 10,000s of visitors. They have a thriving outdoor education program with schools, delivering school residentials. Families and individuals take part in activities including skiing and snowboarding, climbing and abseiling, kayaking and paddle boarding, caving, archery, air rifle, tobogganing and disc golf. Their pop-up campsite, Mendip Basecamp, opened to the public in 2020 and in 2023 was named Gold Campsite at the Bristol, Bath and Somerset Tourism Awards.

=== Caving and cave diving ===
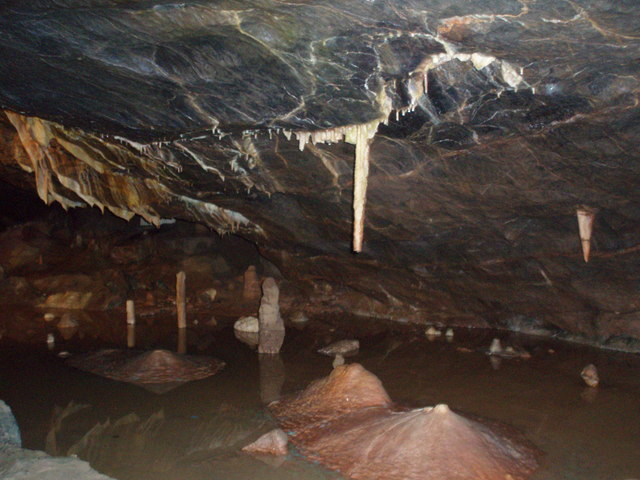
Stalagmites and stalactites in Gough's Cave

Large areas of limestone on the Mendips have been worn away by water, making the hills a national centre for caving. Some of the caves have been known about since the establishment of the Mendip lead mining industry in Roman times. However, many have been discovered or explored only in the 20th century. Specialist equipment and knowledge is required to visit the vast majority of the caves, but Cheddar Gorge and Wookey Hole Caves are two show caves which are easily accessible to the public. The active Mendip Caving Group and other local caving organisations organise trips and continue to discover new caverns.

The Hills conceal the largest underground river system in Britain; attempts to move from one cave to another through the underground rivers led to the development of cave diving in Britain. The first cave dive was attempted at Swildon's Hole in 1934, and the first successful dive was achieved the following year at Wookey Hole Caves, which has the deepest sump in Britain at 76 m (249 ft). The cave complexes at St. Dunstan's Well Catchment, Lamb Leer, and Priddy Caves have been identified as Sites of Special Scientific Interest. The deepest cave in the Mendip Hills is Charterhouse Cave with a vertical range of 220 m (722 ft).

Many caves in the Mendip area were excavated for archaeological and natural history studies by pioneer explorer Herbert E. Balch and were photographed by the early caver Harry Savory at the start of the 20th century using cameras, glass plates and flash powder.

=== Walking ===
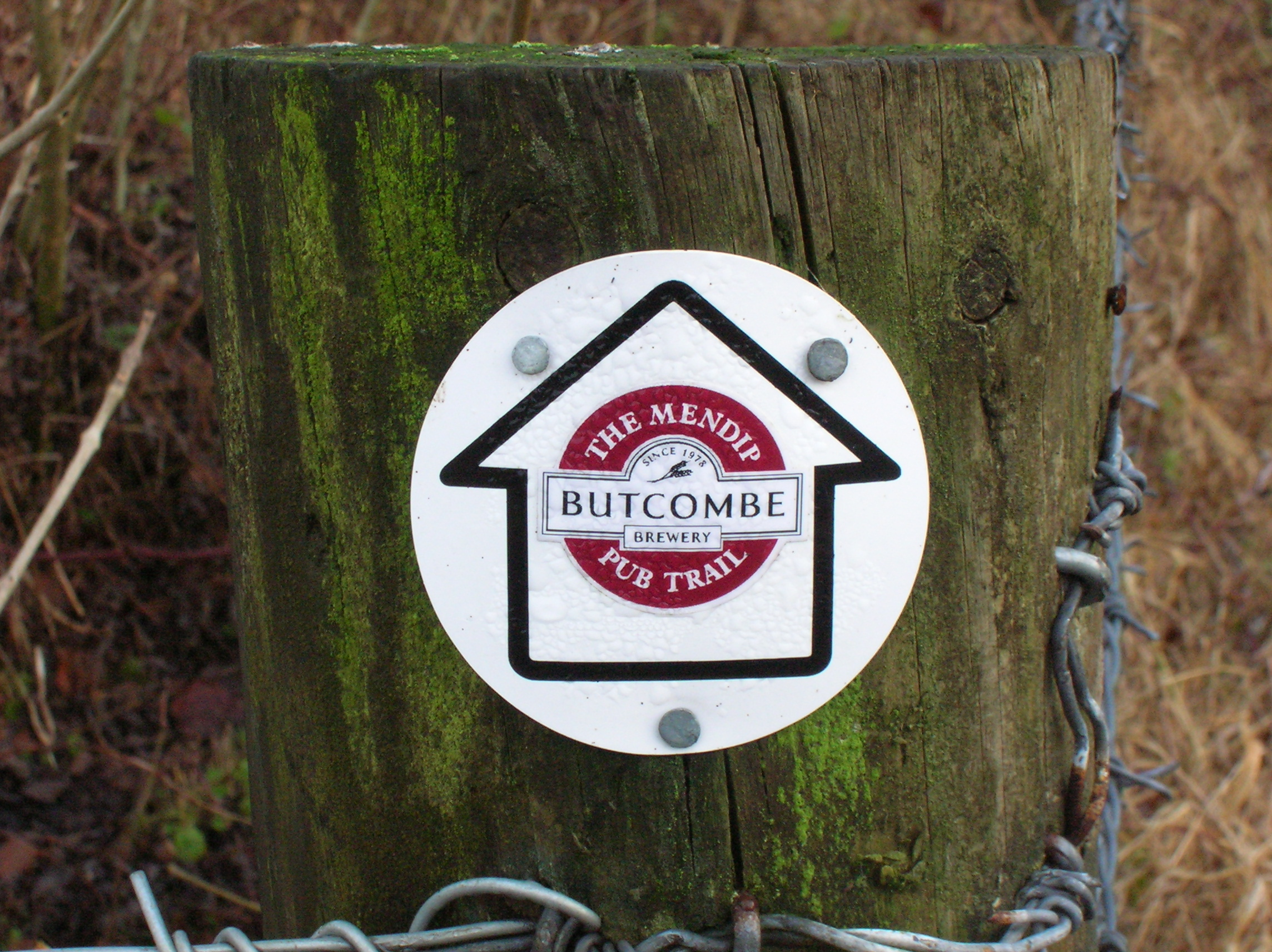
A marker for the Mendip Pub Trail at Charterhouse

Several sites on the Mendips are designated as open access land, and there are many footpaths and bridleways that are generally clearly marked.

The Limestone Link is a 58-kilometre (36 mi) long-distance footpath from the Mendips to the Cotswolds, and the Mendip Way covers 80 km (50 mi) from Weston-super-Mare to Frome. The western section runs from the Bristol Channel at Uphill Cliff, affording views over the Somerset Levels, crosses the central Mendip plateau leading down to Cheddar Gorge, and then continues to Wells and Frome. The much longer Monarch's Way runs for 990 km (620 mi), from Worcester to Shoreham-by-Sea in West Sussex. It closely follows the route taken by Charles II after his defeat at the Battle of Worcester in 1651. The route enters Somerset near Chewton Mendip and crosses the Mendip Hills heading for Wells. A shorter local path, the 72-kilometre (45 mi) long Mendip Pub Trail, connects six pubs owned by Butcombe Brewery. The trail runs from Hinton Blewett through Priddy, Axbridge, Bleadon, Rowberrow, and Compton Martin.

=== Motor sport ===
Various forms of oval short-track racing, including F1 and F2 stock cars, have taken place at Mendips Raceway since 1969. The track is located on Warrens Hill Road, on the rim of Batts Combe quarry between Shipham and Charterhouse.

== In the arts ==
Thomas Hardy described the Mendips as "a range of limestone rocks stretching from the shores of the Bristol Channel into the middle of Somersetshire", and several of his books refer to the Mendips or sites on the hills. According to legend, Augustus Montague Toplady was inspired to write the words of the hymn "Rock of Ages" while sheltering under a rock in Burrington Combe during a thunderstorm in 1763; there is a metal plaque marking the site.

== See also ==
- Geography of the United Kingdom § Geology
- Geology of Somerset
- List of Sites of Special Scientific Interest in Somerset
