= List of underwater explorers =

This is a list of notable professional and amateur explorers who have personally explored the underwater environment and contributed towards expanding the knowledge and understanding of that environment. The list may include archaeologists, wreck divers, treasure hunters, biologists, marine geologists, geophysicists, ocean engineers, oceanographers, crew of exploration submersibles, cave divers and surveyors of the underwater topography, but these categories are not exclusive.

== A ==
- David Attenborough (born 8 May 1926)

== B ==
- Robert Ballard (born 1942), underwater archaeologist, professor at University of Rhode Island
- Graham Balcombe (8 March 1907 – 19 March 2000), a founder of the Cave Diving Group
- Michael C. Barnette (born September 1971)
- Otis Barton (5 June 1899 – 15 April 1992)
- George F. Bass (1932–2021), pioneer underwater archaeologist, author, founded Institute of Nautical Archaeology in 1973
- William Beebe (29 July 1877 – 4 June 1962)
- Samuel Stillman Berry (1887–1984), U.S. marine zoologist.
- Henry Bryant Bigelow (1879–1967), U.S. marine biologist.
- Mensun Bound (born 1953), British maritime archaeologist
- David Bright (29 June 1957 – 8 July 2006)

== C ==
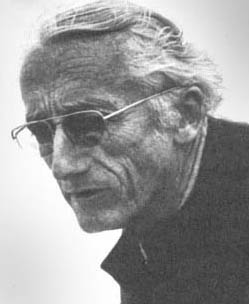
Jacques-Yves Cousteau, co-inventor of the aqua-lung.

- James Cameron (born 16 August 1954)
- Rachel Carson (1907–1964), American Marine Biologist and Author.
- John Chatterton (born 1954), co-discoverer of the Pirate Ship of Joseph Bannister, Golden Fleece
- Carl Chun (1852–1914), German marine biologist
- Arthur C. Clarke (16 December 1917 – 19 March 2008), – discovered the underwater ruins of the Koneswaram Temple in Trincomalee, Sri Lanka
- Barry Clifford (born 30 May 1945), – American underwater archaeological explorer
- Jacques-Yves Cousteau (1910–1997), French marine biologist and explorer
- Clive Cussler (15 July 1931 – 24 February 2020)

== E ==
- Sylvia Earle (born 1935), American oceanographer
- Sheck Exley (1 April 1949 – 6 April 1994), cave diving pioneer

== F ==
- Michèle Marie Fieux, oceanographer
- Mel Fisher, archeologist(?)

== G ==
- Nuno Gomes (born 1951), South African diver, holder of world records for deep diving and deepest cave dive

== H ==
- Richard Harris, Australian cave diver
- Jochen Hasenmayer (born 1941), German cave diver
- Hans Hass (1919–2013), Austrian marine biologist and diving pioneer
- Graham Hawkes – Submersible designer and pilot
- Jill Heinerth – Cave diver and underwater explorer
- Gotthilf Hempel (born 1929), German marine biologist
- Johan Hjort (1869–1948), Norwegian marine zoologist and one of the founders of ICES
- Bruno Hofer (1861–1916), German fisheries scientist
- Emperor Showa of Japan (1901–1989), jellyfish taxonomist

== J ==
- Jarrod Jablonski (born 1969), pioneering technical diver and record setting cave diver

== K ==
- Brian Kakuk, cave diver in the Bahamas
- Uwe Kils (born 1951), German marine biologist
- John Knauss, oceanographer
- Artur Kozłowski (17 October 1977 – 5 September 2011), Polish cave diver who died on a dive in Ireland
- August David Krohn (1803–1891), Russian/German zoologist

== L ==
- Steve Lewis (born 1950), Canadian cave diver, author, marine archaeologist
- Jon Lindbergh (1932–2021),
- Edwin Albert Link (July 26, 1904 – September 7, 1981)

== M ==
- Robert F. Marx (1936–2019), pioneer underwater archaeologist, prolific author
- John Mattera (born 1962), discoverer of the pirate ship of Joseph Bannister, and the Golden Fleece, and cave diver who mapped cave systems in the Dominican Republic
- Agnes Milowka (23 December 1981 – 27 February 2011), Australian cave diver, underwater photographer and author
- Sir John Murray (1841–1914), Scots–Canadian marine biologist

== N ==
- Mark M. Newell, founder of Georgia Archaeological Institute
- Wheeler J. North (1922–2002), American marine biologist and diving pioneer
- Phil Nuytten – Deep-ocean explorer, and inventor of atmospheric diving suits

== P ==
- Auguste Piccard (28 January 1884 – 24 March 1962), Swiss physicist, inventor and explorer
- Jacques Piccard (28 July 1922 – 1 November 2008), Swiss oceanographer and engineer

== R ==
- Roger Revelle (7 arch 1909 – 15 July 1991)
- Ed Ricketts (1897–1948), American marine biologist noted for a pioneering study of intertidal ecology
- Harald Rosenthal (born 1937), German hydrobiologist known for his work in fish farming and ecology
- William R. Royal (16 March 1905 – 8 May 1997), explorer of Warm Mineral Springs and Little Salt Spring in Florida

== S ==
E. Lee Spence, pioneer underwater archaeologist, author, editor, and discoverer of the Hunley.

- David Shaw (1954–2005), Australian cave diver
- Jack Sheppard (31 March 1909 – 14 July 2001), pioneer of cave diving in the United Kingdom and a founder of the Cave Diving Group
- Wes Skiles (March 6, 1958 – July 21, 2010), documentary filmmaker
- Edd Sorenson (born 1959), American cave diver known for rescues and body recoveries
- E. Lee Spence (born 1947), pioneer underwater archaeologist and treasure hunter
- Rick Stanton (born 1961)
- Robert Sténuit (born 1933), underwater archeologist and the world's first aquanaut
- Bill Stone (born 1952), American caver and explorer, known for exploring deep caves, sometimes with autonomous underwater vehicle
- Kathryn D. Sullivan (born 1951), Marine geologist

== T ==
- Peter Throckmorton (1928–1990), pioneer underwater archaeologist, director of the Sea Research Society
- Gunnar Thorson (1906–1971), Danish marine biologist
- Ruth Turner (1915–2000), marine biologist

== V ==
- Victor Vescovo (born 1966)
- Allyn Vine (1914–1994),

== W ==
- Don Walsh (born 2 November 1931)
