= Ernest Baker =

Ernest Baker may refer to:

- King Ernest Baker (1939–2000), American blues and soul singer and jazz musician
- Ernest Hamlin Baker (1889–1975), American artist and illustrator
- Ernest A. Baker (1869–1941), English author and editor
