= Eastwater Cavern =

Limestone cave in Somerset, England

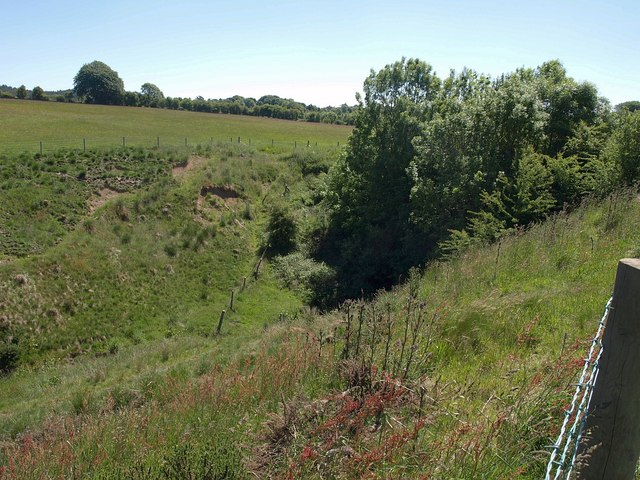
- Entrance to Eastwater Cavern

- Location within Somerset
- Location: Priddy, Somerset, UK
- OS grid: ST 5388 5062
- Coordinates: 51°15′10″N 2°39′45″W
- Length: 3,510 metres (11,520 ft)
- Height variation: 152 metres (499 ft)
- Elevation: 238 metres (781 ft)
- Discovery: 1902
- Geology: Carboniferous Limestone
- Difficulty: Grade 3-5
- Hazards: flooding and loose boulders
- Access: Call at Eastwater farm (ST 537 508), £1 goodwill fee. Changing facilities in barn.
- Cave survey: Upper Series Plan and Lower Series Plan
- Registry: Mendip Cave Registry

Eastwater Cavern is a cave near Priddy in the limestone of the Mendip Hills, in Somerset, England. It is also known as Eastwater Swallet. It was first excavated in April 1902 by a team led by Herbert E. Balch composed of paid labourers and volunteers from the Wells Natural History Society. Progress was initially slow, but by February 1903 Balch and Willcox had discovered substantial passage, following the streamway down to the bottom of the cave. Dolphin Pot was dug in 1940 by the Wessex Cave Club, with Primrose Pot following in 1950. West End series was the most recent significant discovery, in 1983.

On 28 August 1910 severe flooding rendered the boulder ruckles unstable, and the bottom of the cave was not reached again for another three years. The cavern was the site of a fatal accident in 1960, when Alan Hartnell was hit by rock-fall. Several areas of the boulder chokes remain unstable.

Dolphin ladder pitch also suffered a rock fall and was blocked by a sofa-sized boulder in 1959, but the route was re-opened in 1966.

The water resurges at Wookey Hole Caves 4 kilometres (2.5 mi) to the south, and 180 metres (590 ft) below the cave entrance.

== Description ==
The entrance proceeds through boulders towards the upper traverse, a wide bedding-plane angled 40 degrees downwards. Further passage takes the caver downwards towards the canyon. The lower levels are accessed via pitches and climbs, including Primrose Pot, which at 57 metres (187 ft) is one of the deepest vertical pitches on the Mendips.

== See also ==
- Caves of the Mendip Hills
