= Ernest A. Baker =

English author and editor

Ernest Albert Baker (1869–1941) was an author, and editor of English fiction, dictionaries, and librarianship, besides books and journalism on outdoor activities, particularly caving.

Baker wrote a standard reference, The History of the English Novel, first published in ten volumes between 1924 and 1939. Baker also wrote A Guide to Historical Fiction (1914), an overview of historical fiction in novels and short stories.

His caving books were Moors, Crags and Caves of the High Peak and Neighbourhood (1903); with Herbert E. Balch, The Netherworld of Mendip; Explorations in the Great Caverns of Somerset, Yorkshire, Derbyshire & Elsewhere (1907), and Caving; Episodes of Underground Exploration (1932).

He edited book series for George Routledge including the Half-Forgotten Books series (1903–1907) and the Library of Early Novelists.

== Bibliography ==
- Moors, Crags and the Caves of the High Peak and Neighbourhood (1903)
- A Descriptive Guide to the Best Fiction British and American (1903)
- The Netherworld of Mendip (with Herbert E. Balch) (1907)
- Explorations in the Great Caverns of Somerset, Yorkshire, Derbyshire & Elsewhere (1907)
- A Guide to Historical Fiction (1914)
- The Public Library (1922)
- The Highlands with Rope and Rucksack (1923)
- The History of the English Novel (1924-39) in 10 vols.
- Caving; Episodes of Underground Exploration (1932)
