= The Blue School, Wells =

The Blue School

Location
- Kennion Road; Wells, Somerset; England; 51.2125°N 2.6542°W

Information
- Type: Academy
- Motto: Recta Certa (Straight and true)
- Religious affiliation: Church of England
- Established: 1641; 385 years ago
- Specialist: Science College
- Department for Education URN: 137285 Tables
- Ofsted: Reports
- Head teacher: Mark Woodlock
- Age: 11 to 18
- Enrolment: 1,357 in 2025
- Website: http://www.theblueschoolwells.co.uk

The Blue School is a coeducational, secondary school located in Wells, Somerset, England. It had 1,357 students aged 11 to 18 of all ability levels of which 284 were in the sixth form in 2025. It is currently a Church of England voluntary controlled school. The school motto is "Recta Certa", which means 'straight and true'. It became an Academy in August 2011.

An Ofsted inspection in 2007 judged the school to be 'outstanding', while the next Ofsted inspection in 2010 rated the school as 'good', with outstanding elements. A further Ofsted inspection was conducted throughout October 2013 again giving a rating of Good. The school is a Specialist Science College and in 2006 the Princess Royal opened a new science centre.

== History of the school ==
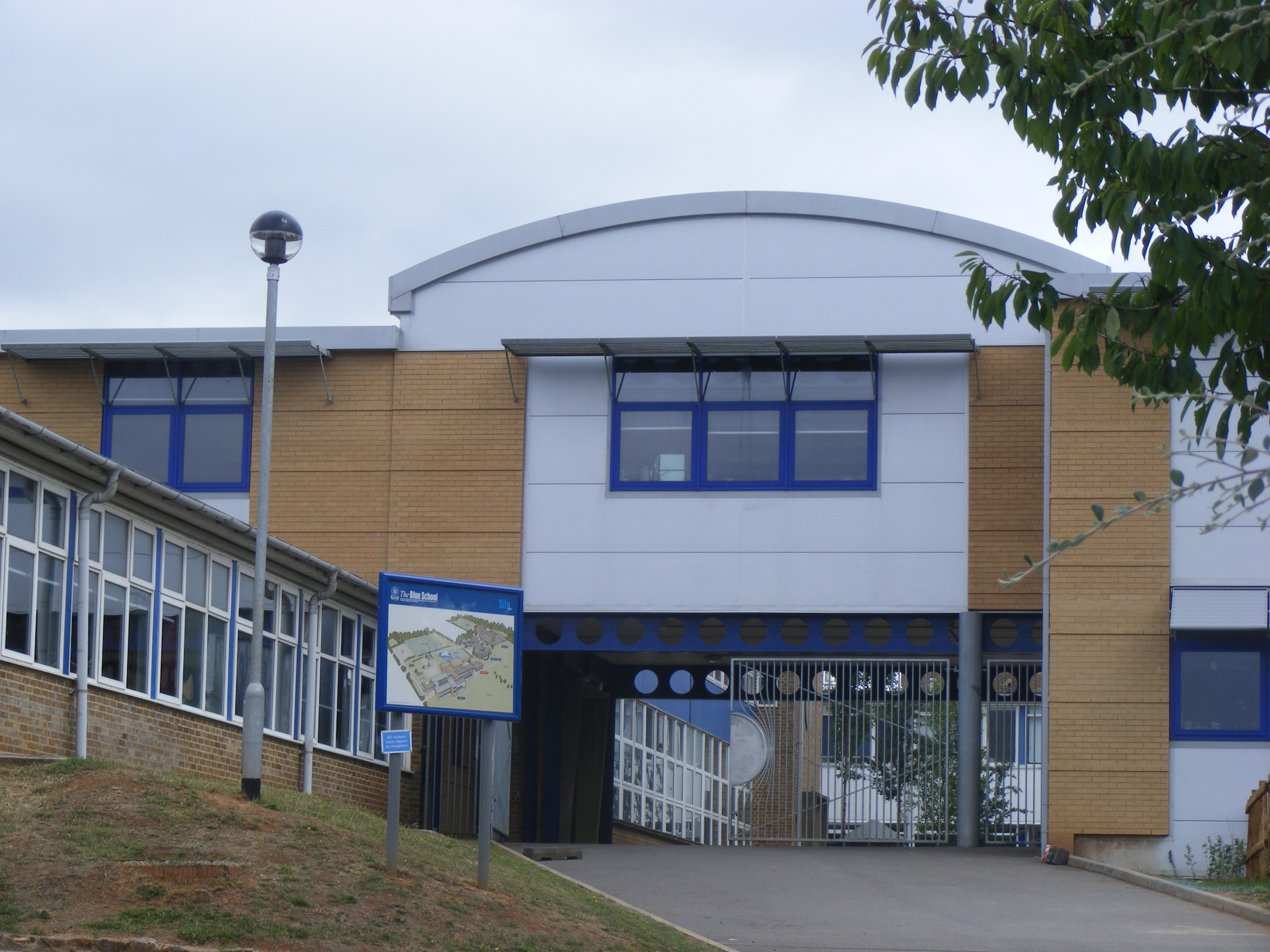
The new science block

The school was founded in 1641 as one of the first free schools in the country. The name Blue comes from the early uniforms which were blue in colour. Some visitors to Wells have expected the school itself to be blue in colour, but this is not the case.

In 1654, Margaret, widow of Ezekiel Barkham of Wells, purchased a farm in Yenston, to endow a school in Wells. The Blue School retained the farm for nearly 350 years until it was sold in 1990 and 1992. The income from the endowment was to be used for paying a schoolmaster's salary of £20 pa. and the residue for apprenticing the boys when they could 'read, write and cast accounts'.

The school owned a number of properties in the area scattered over several parishes.

Other schools were united with The Blue School foundation, including Hodge's Charity School. As befitting a Church of England foundation, the Blue School has a Chaplain, plus partnership links with a school in Zambia.

In December of 2023 it was discovered that the Kennion block had structural issues. This caused the building to close to all students and staff as a precautionary measure whilst further investigations were undertaken. The school reinstated online learning and began allowing two year groups in at a time whilst others participated online. The building remains under investigation by structural engineers and the school has reduced access. Beginning in April 2024 the school installed and opened a series of temporary buildings to regain the lost classrooms. This allowed all year groups to return to school and a focus on the future of the Kennion building.

== The Blue School Council ==
The Blue School was the first pilot for an innovative approach to school councils based on self-selection called Learning to Lead. The School Community Council received praise in the School's 2007 Ofsted report.

The school council runs on principles of self-election, and has over 250 members, including students of all ages and staff. Meetings are conducted during lunch times and projects include keeping chickens, fundraising for many charities, and running a garden.

In 2010 a project was launched, backed by Lottery Funding, to set up a school-based radio station. The project, run by students, produced a series of podcasts. In mid 2013, after relocating, the "Blue Lounge Radio" prepared to begin to broadcast again pending the arrival of new hardware.

A charity for the benefit of the poor of St. Cuthbert's parish was established in 1675 by the will of Adrian Hickes of London, although lands in Wells and Glastonbury to endow the charity were not purchased until 1701. In 1713 a voluntary subscription school was established in Wells for boys and girls and a schoolroom was built for this purpose by Philip Hodges. He also purchased land in Glastonbury St. John, the income from which was to be used to pay the master's salary. In 1715 it was proposed that a charity established by Barkham be amalgamated with that deriving from the Hickes bequest.

Philip Hodges' will of 1723 empowered the master of the subscription school established in 1713 to teach also the pupils of Barkham's charity school. Lands in Lympsham, East Pennard and Pylle were purchased in 1732 and an estate at Norwood Park, Glastonbury in 1735. In 1740 the estates of all three charities were transferred to new trustees. Some property in Frome was acquired between 1732 and 1764 and in Queen Camel between 1730 and 1739. The charities all became part of the Blue School foundation.

The school is made up of two main blocks, Milton and Kennion which are named after the roads which they are closest to. They were built as separate schools in the 1950s and 1960s respectively but they were joined in the 1970s. The next major change was the sports centre in 1999 which added large sporting facilities for the use of the school and the general public. In 2005, the school built a new science block. More recently, in 2013, a block (named Barkham) was built, on the disused swimming pool. A Sixth Form Centre has also been added.

== Alumni ==
- Speleologist and founder of Wells Museum Herbert E. Balch (1869–1958) won a scholarship to the school.
- Filmmaker Edgar Wright was a student at the school from 1985 to 1992.
- Actor Duncan Pow was a student at the school.
- Scholar and humanitarian practitioner Patrick Webb was a student at the school from 1970 to 1977. He was one of the school's representatives to the Executive Committee of the Wells Civic Society in 1976/77.
- Bob Kerslake, former Head of the Home Civil Service and permanent secretary at the Department for Communities and Local Government, was a student at the school.
