= Dersios cave =

Sinkhole in Arcadia, Greece

Dersios sinkhole
- Location: near Palaiochora in Arcadia, Greece
- Depth: 170 metres (560 ft)

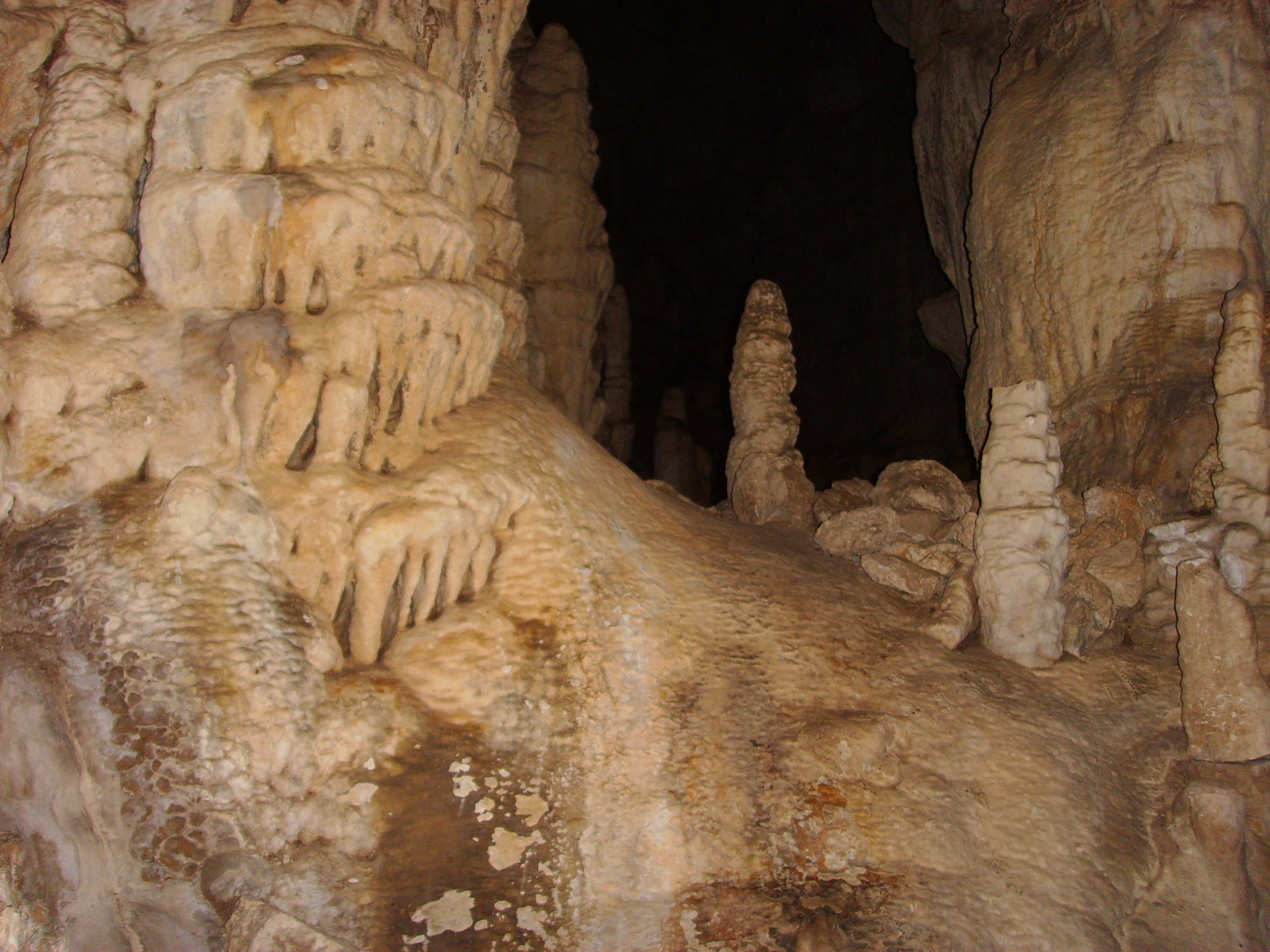
The cave in 2016

The Dersios cave (Greek: Σπηλαιοκαταβόθρα "Ο Δέρσιος" Spilaiokatavothra "O Dhersios") is a cave in Arcadia, Greece.

The cave, which has a depth of 170 metres (560 ft), has been known since antiquity and is located towards the north end of the plateau of Palaiochora at a height of 750 m above sea level on mount Parnon. It is about 45 minutes on unsurfaced road from the nearest town of Tyros in the Kynouria region of Arcadia. The cave was first explored in August 1974 to a depth of 81 metres (266 ft) by a French team (in collaboration with the Hellenic Speleological Society). Since 2003, SELAS caving club in Greece has been exploring the cave, doubling the depth and more than tripling the length of the cave. The new discoveries were made in 2003 by cave diving the first sump and emptying it by siphoning the water and in 2005 by emptying sumps in side passages of the cave.
