= Herbert E. Balch =

English archaeologist and caver (1869–1958)

- Portrait of Balch
- Born: 4 November 1869; Wells, Somerset
- Died: 27 May 1958 (aged 88); Wells, Somerset
- Occupations: Archaeologist, Speleologist, Geologist, Naturalist

Herbert Ernest Balch (4 November 1869 – 27 May 1958) MA FSA was an English archaeologist, naturalist, caver and geologist who explored the caves of the Mendip Hills and pioneered many of the techniques used by modern cavers. Born in Wells, he gained a scholarship to The Blue School before leaving school at the age of 14 to become a messenger for Wells Post Office.

Balch became interested in stratigraphy and cave archaeology after attending a talk by William Boyd Dawkins. Balch led much of the exploration through the caves near Wookey Hole village, discovering and mapping many caves. He also made discoveries of artefacts used by the people who lived in the caves during the Iron Age. Balch was a founder member of the Wells Natural History and Archaeology Society and through the society he founded the Wells Museum, largely including his own collection of artefacts.

== Early life ==
Herbert Ernest Balch was born in Wells, Somerset on 4 November 1869. His parents were William Balch, a brushmaker, and Sarah Ellen Balch. At the age of seven he gained a scholarship to The Blue School in Wells. There he helped George Johnson, Dean of Wells, who had poor eyesight due to his age, by reading texts.

He left school at 14 and became telegraph messenger boy at Wells Post Office. He remained at the post office for his entire working life, working his way up to postmaster. Whilst working as a messenger, he spent a lot of time at the village of Wookey Hole. He began caving with other teenagers from the village in the mid-1880s. After attending a talk by William Boyd Dawkins, he took an interest in cave archaeology and especially in stratigraphy. In the 1890s, Balch was introduced to the caves of the Mendip Hills by Thomas Willcox, manager of the Priddy lead mines. While caving with Willcox at Lamb Leer in 1897, one of Balch's ropes snapped. He saved himself by catching a guide rope, but the 60-foot (18 m) fall rendered him unconscious, suffering serious friction burns and back injuries.

As Balch finished his formal education early, he compensated through self-improvement, even cycling to London to buy books. He is known for discovering new caving techniques and carefully recording his finds. Balch would spend his free time on Saturdays and after work on caving expeditions, although he would not do any caving on Sundays, for religious reasons. He would set out for some expeditions directly after work, caving overnight and coming home in time to wash before returning to work.

== Excavations ==
Balch's investigations into geomorphology and hydrology led to his decision to try to find the origins of the water that rose to the surface at Wookey Hole Caves, the source of the River Axe. In 1901, he led a team of miners and cavers to dig into Swildon's Hole, where he found the 'Forty Foot Pot' as well as chambers full of stalagmites. Despite the publicity around the find, Balch refused to disclose the location of the cave as he believed it was too dangerous for amateur explorers. The farmer who owned the land denied them entrance the following year, turning the valley into a fish farm, so the team headed upstream where they discovered Eastwater Cavern, one of Balch's personal favourites.

Balch conducted many of his excavations in conjunction with the Somerset Archaeological and Natural History Society; he is credited with being the first to explore many of the caves in the area, the most famous being the Wookey Hole Caves. Balch kept a base at Rookham for his longer excavations, he bought a railway carriage in a field near Rookham from his friend, the headmaster at the Blue School. Balch called the 26-foot long carriage his 'Summer Palace' and modified it to form part of a bungalow. Balch's family would continue to use the carriage for summer holidays after Balch's death.

In 1906, Balch started investigating the Iron Age cave dwellers in Wookey Hole Caves, embarking on a four-year study of the caves along with other members of the Mendip Nature Research Committee. The group mapped the caves, drew illustrations of their finds and took photographs, collecting the information in the 1914 book Wookey Hole: its Caves and Cave-Dwellers. When giving lectures on the cave dwellers, he would compare them to Eskimos, drawing parallels in their art and hunting styles, and would show pictures of the tools used by the cave dwellers that he discovered in Wookey Hole Caves, as well as items such as brooches and child's play toys. He also told of a goat-herd he discovered in a cave who had died, leaving his goats tethered, subsequently perishing.

Balch was a member of caving clubs such as the Wessex Cave Club. He was a serious speleologist and often made ten-hour trips wearing cloth cap, old suit and tie. Balch Cave near Stoke St Michael is named after him. As an authority on the caves under the Mendip Hills, Balch was consulted by water companies who were looking for new water supplies.

== Wells Museum ==
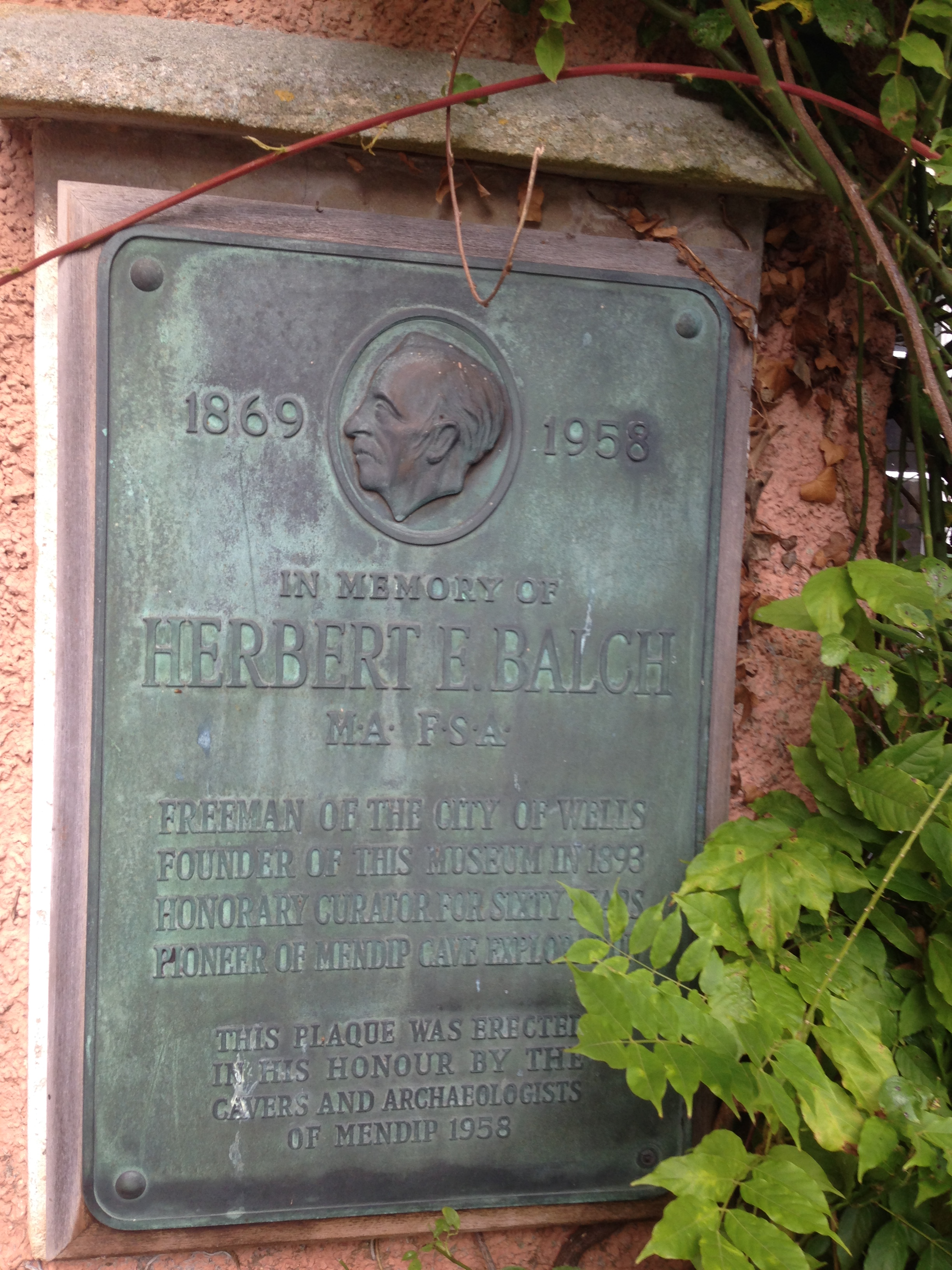
The plaque at the Wells and Mendip Museum

Balch was a founder member of the Wells Natural History and Archaeological Society, using his connections at Wells Cathedral to organise lectures. It was through the society and with help of Thomas Jex-Blake, Dean of Wells, that Balch managed to set up the Wells Museum in 1893, displaying his own artefacts in the cathedral's cloister. The museum had grown significantly by 1928 so Balch persuaded William Wyndham to purchase a property for the museum on the cathedral green. In 1932, the museum was relocated to the cathedral green, eventually becoming the Wells and Mendip Museum. He remained honorary curator of the Wells Museum throughout his life.

== Later life ==
Balch married Ellen Elizabeth Brooks on 28 August 1893 but the marriage ended with her death from cancer in 1896. He married Ellen Elizabeth Seaford, his first wife's cousin, in 1899 and the couple went on to have seven children. The children would regularly help out at the museum and search for archaeological artefacts in fields.

Balch was awarded an honorary Master of Arts by Bristol University in July 1927 for devoting his leisure time to exploring and recording the caves of the Mendip Hills, becoming an authority on the subject. He retired as postmaster on 31 March 1931, whilst continuing his caving, working as the curator at the museum and giving lectures on archaeology.

He was a keen gardener and beekeeper.

In 1944, Balch was awarded the freedom of the City of Wells, the achievement he was most proud of. He spent time in retirement as churchwarden for Church of St Cuthbert, Wells. On 27 May 1958, Balch died at his home in Wells.

== Bibliography ==
- Balch, Herbert E.; Baker, Ernest Albert (1907). The Netherworld of Mendip: Explorations in the Great Caverns of Somerset, Yorkshire, Derbyshire and Elsewhere. Kent: Baker/Simpkins, Marshall, Hamilton.
- Balch, Herbert E.; Dawkins, William Boyd (1914). Wookey Hole; Its Caves and Cave Dwellers. Oxford University Press.
- Balch, Herbert E. (1926). The Caves of Mendip. London: Folk Press.
- Balch, Herbert E. (1929). Mendip-the Great Cave of Wookey Hole. Wells: Clare, Son & Co.
- Balch, Herbert E. (1935). Mendip-Cheddar, its Gorge and Caves. Wells: Clare, Son & Co.
- Balch, Herbert E. (1937). Mendip : its swallet caves, and rock shelters. Wells: Clare, Son & Co.

== See also ==
- Édouard-Alfred Martel
