= Jack Sheppard (cave diver) =

British cave diver

- Born: John Arthur Sheppard; 31 March 1909; Lewisham, Kent, England
- Died: 14 July 2001 (aged 92)
- Known for: Cave diving

John Arthur Sheppard (31 March 1909 – 14 July 2001) was a pioneer of cave diving in the United Kingdom and a founder, together with Graham Balcombe, of the Cave Diving Group.

== Life and career ==
He was born at Lewisham, Kent (south east London) on 31 March 1909. Sheppard worked for the Post Office as a telecommunications engineer. He and Graham Balcombe became rock climbing partners and while based in Bristol became interested in the caves of the Mendip Hills, particularly Swildon's Hole which they believed connected to Wookey Hole Caves. They proved this by putting dye into the water at Swildon's and seeing it emerge at Wookey.

Various attempts were made to enter these underwater cave systems using shore-based pumped-air diving suits, without much success. An initial dive in 1934 was unsuccessful and the first successful dive was the following year at Wookey Hole. They returned with improved equipment and succeeded in further exploration. Sheppard constructed his own dry suit, incorporating an oxygen rebreathing system, and used this to make the first successful cave dive in Swildon's Hole on 4 October 1936.

For the initial 1934 dive Sheppard and colleague Francis Graham Balcombe constructed the first underwater breathing apparatus for cave diving. This amazing contraption was constructed with recycled household items, including a bicycle pump and tobacco tin. It provided the means for the pioneering exploration of Swildon's Hole and other caves in Mendip. The bicycle respirator is composed of several key elements: rubber mouth attachment, a flexible hosepipe, bicycle pump and tobacco tin stopper, all held together with metal clips. It is a kind of homemade snorkel but designed to be attached to a pump to supply the air for underwater cave diving. The bicycle respirator can be seen at Wells and Mendip Museum.

During his later life, Jack Sheppard was made Honorary President of the Cave Diving Group.

He died 14 July 2001.

== See also ==
- Caving in the United Kingdom
