= Wells and Mendip Museum =

Museum in Wells, Somerset, England

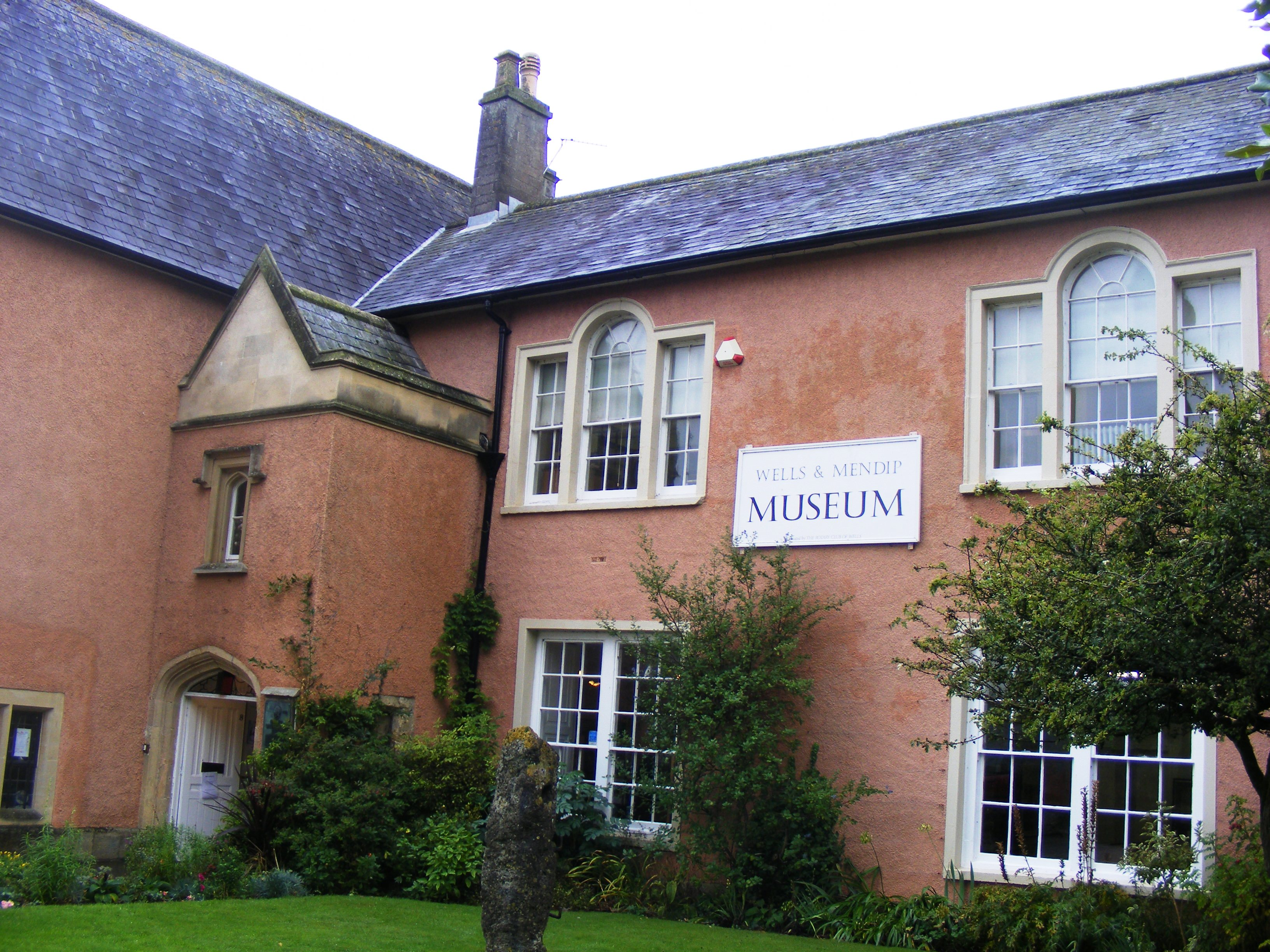

- Location within Somerset and the United Kingdom
- Established: 1893
- Location: Wells, Somerset, England
- Coordinates: 51.2109°N 2.6445°W
- Website: www.wellsmuseum.org.uk

The Wells and Mendip Museum is a museum in the city of Wells. It is a registered charity and an accredited member of the Museums, Libraries and Archives Council. The exhibits include items of local history and archaeological finds.

== Building ==
The museum is next to Wells Cathedral, and housed in the former Chancellors' House, with 15th-century origins, however most of the current fabric of the building is from the 17th and 18th centuries. The stone building has gabled roofs of Welsh slate. A small entrance hall provides access to a staircase hall leading to a salon in Gothic Revival style with a marble fireplace. The front of the building was remodelled around 1828 and the rear includes a 20th-century extension. It has been designated as a Grade II listed building.

== Museum history ==
It was founded by Herbert E. Balch in 1893, to display his collection of local artefacts and memorabilia, and further exhibits have been added since. It is run by the Wells Natural History and Archaeological Society and moved from its original site in the Cathedral cloister to its present home in 1932.

== Collections ==
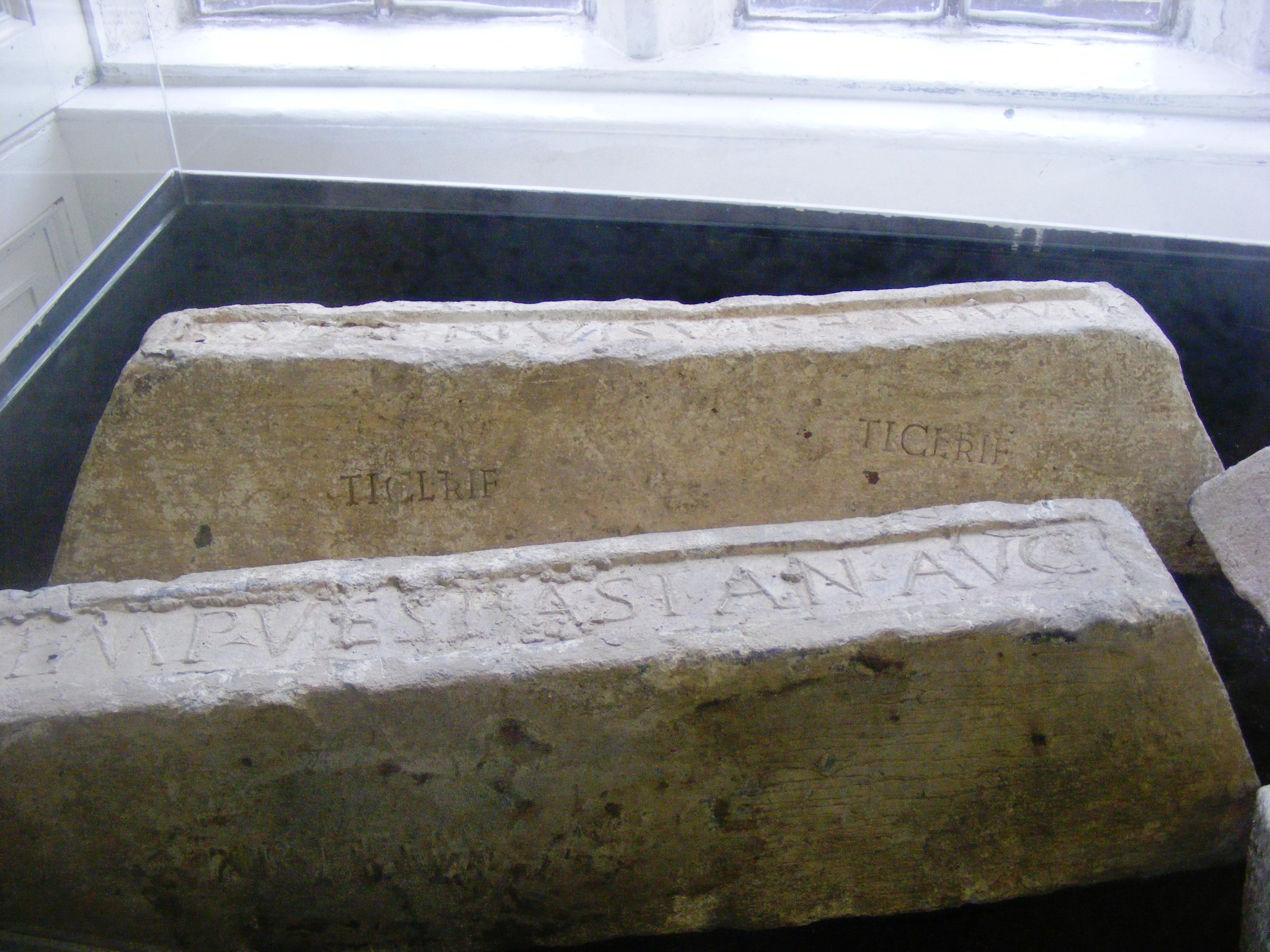
Lead ingots from Roman Britain

The Balch Room houses exhibits of geology and fossils collected from the Mendip Hills, many of which date from the Stone Age and Iron Ages. Other exhibits include lead ingots from Roman Britain, statuary from Wells Cathedral, and a collection of 18th century samplers. Speleological exhibits include a skeleton found by Balch in Wookey Hole Caves and thought to be that of the Witch of Wookey Hole; and a collection of animal bones found in 2004, when a cave was discovered in the car park of the Hunters Lodge Inn in Priddy.
