= Swildon's Hole =

Cave in Somerset, England

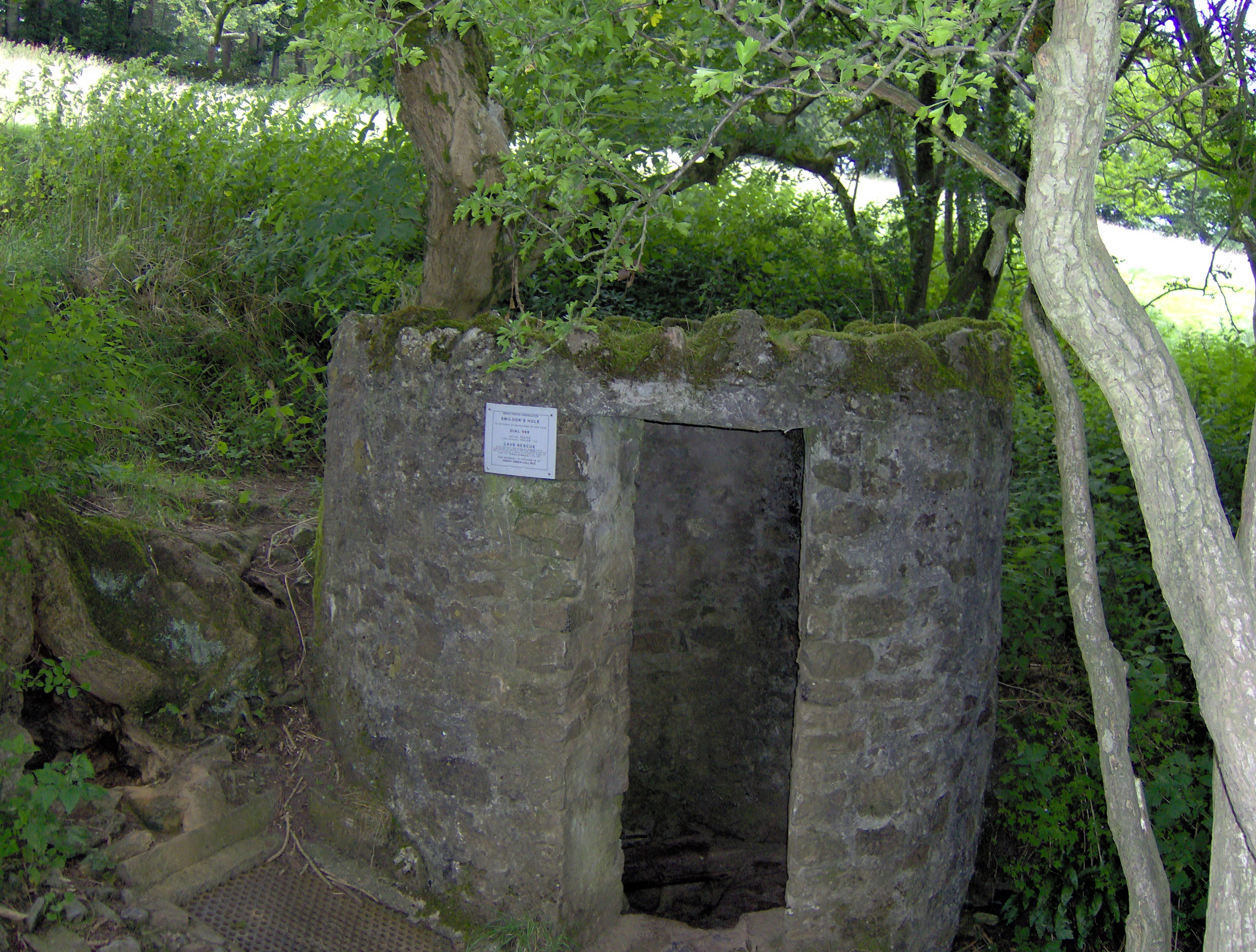
- Entrance structure

- Location within Somerset
- Location: Priddy, Somerset, England
- OS grid: ST 5312851297
- Coordinates: 51°15′32″N 2°40′23″W
- Depth: 167 metres (548 ft)
- Length: 9,144 metres (30,000 ft)
- Elevation: 238 metres (781 ft)
- Discovery: 1901
- Geology: Limestone
- Access: Manor Farm
- Cave survey: 1. Bracknell CC (overlaid on map); 2. Geological Conservation Review/ Wessex Cave Club; 3. "Swildon's Hole". Mendip Cave Registry & Archive.
- BRAC grade: 4
- Registry: Mendip Cave Registry

Swildon's Hole is an extensive cave in Priddy, Somerset. At 9,144 metres (30,000 ft) in length, it is the longest cave on the Mendip Hills. It has been found to be connected to Priddy Green Sink and forms part of the Priddy Caves Site of Special Scientific Interest (SSSI).

The upper series of the cave compresses many features into a relatively short space. The cave goes far beyond this, however, and the lower reaches of the cave continue to provide challenges for even the most experienced of cave divers.

The name may be a corruption of Swithun, an Anglo-Saxon bishop of Winchester, as the land in the area was owned by St Swithin's Priory in Winchester.

== History ==
The cave was first entered on 16 August 1901 by members of the Wells Natural History and Archaeological Society. Very rapid progression was made to what is now known as the 40 foot pot. Between 1903 and 1910, in spite of access being banned by the landowner, various trips took place to photograph and explore the passages.

In 1914 the limit of exploration was extended to Twenty Foot Pot, and in 1921 the first of the sumps was reached, but not passed (despite attempts to make progress by blasting). Sump 1 was finally successfully dived in 1936, and Sump 2 was passed soon afterwards. By this point a length of cave only one-fifth of the amount known today had been discovered.

Ever since 1936 caving groups have been seeking to extend the explored area of the cave, and thus far eleven principal sumps have been passed. Sump 12 has so far proved impassable. Work continues to find a way through the adjacent Sump 12b.

== Access ==
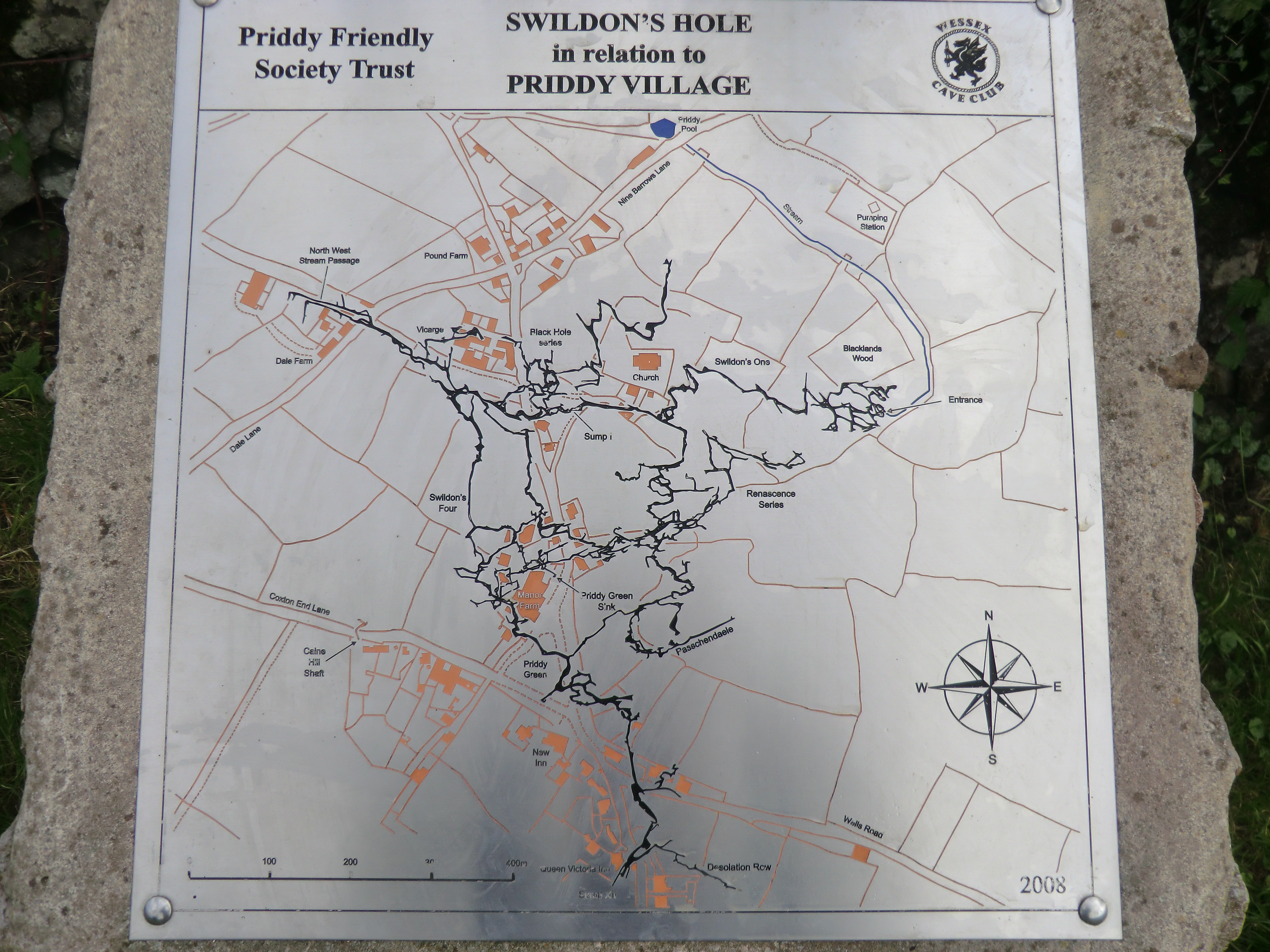
Plan of Swildon's Hole in relation to Priddy, displayed on a plaque in the village

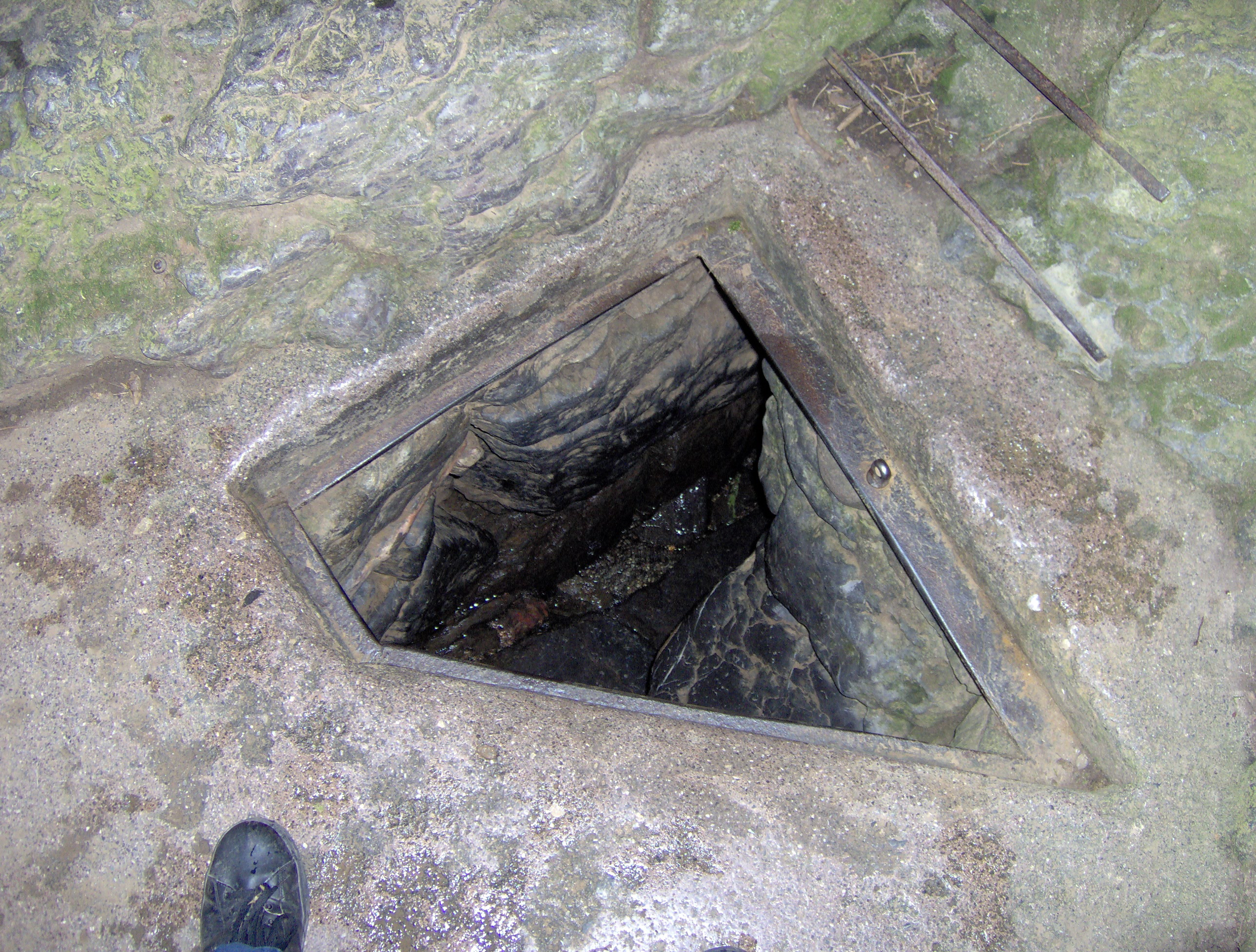
Entrance to Swildon's Hole

The entrance to Swildon's Hole is now a small triangular opening contained within a stone blockhouse in a clump of trees 550 metres (1,804 ft) north-east of Manor Farm, Priddy.

Swildon's Hole is a very popular cave and there are often several separate groups underground at the same time.

== Description ==
The cave contains an active streamway, which has caused a highly varied cave system. Areas of the system range from low passages, through which cavers must crawl, to impressive chambers with sheer drops, and from dry fossil passages to thundering waterfalls and its infamous sumps. A plaque mounted on a stone plinth near Priddy village green shows a plan of the cave, overlaying a map of the village (see right).

The cave exhibits a combination of vadose development (formed above the water table), including continuing formation of the main streamway, and phreatic passages (formed below a latterly lowered water table). These resulted in very different types of passageway, with the phreatic tubes, since abandoned by much of the water, forming an undulating route, much of which is known as the ‘short round trip’.

Only a handful of the 11 principal sumps thus far passed can be dived without dedicated equipment (free-dived).

Sump	Length of dive	Notes
Sump 1	2 metres (7 ft)	Free-divable
Sump 2	8 metres (26 ft)	Free-divable
Sump 3	10 metres (33 ft)	Free-divable but difficult
Sump 4	5 metres (16 ft)	Free-divable. Can be reached by-passing Sumps 1-3 – see below
Sump 5	10 metres (33 ft)	Has been lowered so it can be passed by ducking between airbells
Sump 6	10 metres (33 ft)	Not free-divable; can be by-passed
Sump 7	8 metres (26 ft)	Difficult; can be by-passed
Sump 8	?	Easily by-passed; upstream sump 9 is the limit of free-diving
Sump 9	40 metres (131 ft)	Passable by fully equipped divers only.
Sump 10		Can be by-passed
Sump 11	?	Often silted up; usually by-passed
Sump 12	20 metres (66 ft) plus	Thus far not passed

The length of cave between the sumps are known by the number of the sump at the end of the stretch; thus the stretch between the entrance and Sump 1 is known as Swildon's One, between Sumps 1 and 2 as Swildon's Two, and so on.

Sump 4 can be reached without going through Sumps 1 to 3, via Tratman's Temple, Mud Sump, Fault Chamber and Blue Pencil Passage; parts of this route are extremely difficult.

The connection between Swildon's Hole and Priddy Green Sink was the first major through route discovered on the Mendip Hills. Following a number of months of digging and blasting, the link was made in 1996 at the top of the Cowsh Avens Series, a 120 metres (394 ft) climb above Sump 4.

The water in the cave resurges in Wookey Hole Caves. This was first demonstrated (by pouring dye into the water) by Graham Balcombe and Jack Sheppard of the Cave Diving Group, who first passed Sumps 1 and 2 in the 1930s.

== See also ==
- Caves of the Mendip Hills

== Bibliography ==
- Irwin, David; Moody, Alison; Farrant, Andy; Hanwell(Ed), Jim; Witcombe(Ed), Richard (2007). Swildon's Hole - 100 Years of Exploration. Wessex Cave Club. ISBN 978-0-9500433-5-7.
- Farr, Martyn (1991). The Darkness Beckons. ISBN 0-939748-32-0.
