= Sump (cave) =

Passage in a cave that is submerged under water

Sumps often block access to "dry" passage beyond them. Diagram B shows a "perched" sump, which could be siphoned to lower the water level.

A sump, or siphon, is a passage in a cave that is submerged under water. A sump may be static, with no inward or outward flow, or active, with continuous through-flow. Static sumps may also be connected underwater to an active stream passage. When short in length, a sump may be called a duck; however, this can also refer to a section or passage with some (minimal) airspace above the water.

Depending on hydrological factors specific to a cave – such as the sea tide, changes in river flow, or the relationship with the local water table – sumps and ducks may fluctuate in water level and depth (and sometimes in length, due to the shape of adjacent passage).

== Exploration past a sump ==
=== Diving ===
Short sumps may be passed simply by holding one's breath while ducking through the submerged section (for example, Sump 1 in Swildon's Hole). This is known as "free diving" and can only be attempted if the sump is known to be short and not technically difficult (e.g. constricted or requiring navigation). Longer and more technically difficult sumps can only be passed by cave diving (as happened repeatedly in the exploration of Krubera Cave).

=== Draining ===
When practical, a sump can also be drained using buckets, pumps or siphons. Pumping the water away requires the inward flow of water into the sump to be less than the rate at which the pump empties it, as well as a suitable place to collect the emptied water. Upstream sumps have been successfully emptied using hoses to siphon water out of them, such as at the Sinkhole Dersios during exploration in 2005. The water was sent deeper into the sinkhole, and the emptied sumps revealed virgin passage behind them. During a rescue from beyond a downstream sump at Sarkhos Cave in 2002, water was pumped upstream into a dam constructed a few metres above the flooded passage.

Some manuals also mention the use of explosives or other forms of force to empty sumps, but the ecological damage done to the fragile cave environment usually rules out the use of such methods.

== See also ==
- Phreatic zone – Zone in an aquifer below the water table
