= Graham Balcombe =

Pioneering British cave diver

- Born: Francis Graham Balcombe; 8 March 1907; Manchester, England
- Died: 19 March 2000
- Occupation: Telecommunications engineer
- Known for: Rock Climbing, Cave Diving
- Spouse: Mavis

Francis Graham Balcombe (8 March 1907 – 19 March 2000) was a pioneer of cave diving in the United Kingdom and a founder of the Cave Diving Group together with Jack Sheppard.

== Life and career ==
Balcombe began rock climbing in the English Lake District in the 1920s as a Boy Scout. Balcombe continued his love affair with the Lakeland crags during an early posting to Reading, Berkshire, by joining a mountaineering group which later became the Tricouni Club. Balcombe was one of the most technically gifted rock climbers of the early 1930s, pioneering three Lakes climbing routes (Buttonhook HVS, Engineers Slabs, VS and Central Buttress Direct Finish HVS) that were technically far ahead of their time during a two-week period in 1934. In 1936 Balcombe lead a party of German climbers on a visit to the Lake district in what was to be his last significant contribution to the activity.

Balcombe worked for the Post Office as a telecommunications engineer where he met Jack Sheppard. The pair became rock climbing partners and while based in Bristol became interested in the caves of the Mendip Hills, particularly Swildon's Hole which they believed connected to the Cheddar Caves. At the time, the limit of exploration was a flooded underwater passage or "syphon" (sump).

Various attempts were made pass this obstacle, at first using explosives and then by diving. Initial attempts were unsuccessful and Balcombe's attentions moved to Wookey Hole where standard diving dress was used to explore upstream from the limit of the Show Cave at Chamber 3 as far as the Seventh Chamber.

During the Second World War, Balcombe was stationed in Harrogate, North Yorkshire, where he continued to develop his diving equipment, which was put to use at local sites such as Alum Pot, Keld Head and Goyden Pot. After the war Balcombe co-founded the Cave Diving Group in 1946. He ran operations from his base in London and remained involved in cave diving up to his retirement from the activity in 1957.

During his later life, Balcombe was made Honorary President of the Cave Diving Group, a role which he shared with Sheppard. His memoirs were published posthumously in 2007.

== See also ==
- Caving in the United Kingdom
- Short documentary about Balcombe's dive, made by Wookey Hole
