= Glossary of caving and speleology =

There are a number of terms that are used in connection with caves, caving and speleology. The following is an incomplete list.

== A ==
Airbell
An enclosed air space in a flooded tube between the water and the roof
Anthodite

A speleothem (cave formation) composed of long needle-like crystals situated in clusters which radiate outward from a common base.

== B ==
Belly crawl
A passage that is very low.
Biospeleology

A branch of biology dedicated to the study of organisms that live in caves and are collectively referred to as troglofauna.
Boneyard
An intricate maze of limestone with many holes where material has dissolved away.
Boulder choke

A collection of large rocks or rubble that obstructs the passage of a cave or mine. In order to progress through passages, cavers often need to negotiate or clear boulder chokes.
Buffoon
Also called a speleo-buffoon or cave-buffoon, a derogatory term referring to cavers who are unprepared and make poor decisions.

== C ==
Cave conservancy

A specialized land trust that primarily manages caves or karst features in the United States.
Cave digging

The practice of enlarging undiscovered cave openings to allow entry.
Caver
Someone who explores caves for recreation, a synonym for spelunker
Caving
The sport of exploring caves, a synonym for spelunking
Cupola

Recess, indentation, or cavity in the ceiling of a lava tube, a kind of cave formation.

== K ==
Karst

A landscape formed from the dissolution of soluble rocks.

== P ==
Pit
A vertical space for which ascending or rappelling equipment is required.
Pseudokarst

Similar to karsts, but created by different mechanisms.

== R ==
Cave rescue

A highly specialized field of wilderness rescue in which injured, trapped or lost cave explorers are medically treated and extracted from various cave environments.
Resurgence

The point where water emerges from an aquifer.

== S ==
Speleogen

A geological formation within a cave that has been created by the removal of bedrock, rather than as a secondary deposit.
Speleogenesis

The origin and development of caves, the primary process that determines essential features of the hydrogeology of karst and guides its evolution.
Speleothem

Geological formation by mineral deposits that accumulate over time in natural caves
Spelunker
Someone who explores caves as a hobby, a synonym for caver
Spelunking

Exploring caves as a hobby, a synonym for caving
Squeeze
A tight passage.
Stygofauna

Small aquatic animals living in caves and aquifers.
Sump

A cave that is submerged under water. A sump may be static, with no inward or outward flow, or active, with continuous through-flow. Static sumps may also be connected underwater to active stream passage. When short in length, a sump may be called a duck.
Suspension trauma

Also known as harness hang syndrome (HHS), or orthostatic intolerance, is an effect which occurs when the human body is held upright without any movement for a period of time.
Swallow-hole

The point where water drains from the surface into a cave system.

== T ==
Terrace
A series of dams made of rimstone that slopes gently.
Troglobite

An animal that lives entirely in the dark parts of caves
Troglofauna

Small, non-aquatic cave-dwelling animals.

== W ==
Whaletail
A type of descender produced from a block of aluminium that applies a variable degree of friction.
Window
A hole in a thin wall that connects two chambers or passages.

== See also ==
- Glossary of climbing terms
