= Wes Skiles =

American cave diver and cinematographer

- Born: March 6, 1958; Jacksonville, Florida, U.S.
- Died: July 21, 2010 (aged 52); Boynton Beach, Florida, U.S.
- Occupations: Cinematographer, explorer

Wesley Cofer Skiles (March 6, 1958 – July 21, 2010) was an American cave diving pioneer, explorer, and underwater cinematographer. Skiles lived in High Springs, Florida.

== Background ==
Skiles was born on March 6, 1958, in Jacksonville, Florida, and grew up there. He attended Englewood High School where he graduated in 1976. He died on July 21, 2010, while diving near West Palm Beach, Florida.

Skiles started diving when he was eight years old and recalled that he took to water "quite like a fish." A classmate recalled the incident that sparked Skiles' interest in scuba diving and caves. During the 1973–74 school year, the Fossil Club took a field trip to Ginnie Springs. Skiles watched several divers emerge from the spring's caves, and excitedly asked them questions about their hobby. On the ride back to Jacksonville, he kept saying, "That is what I want to do." Pioneering cave diver George Benjamin was an early influence on Skiles' photography.

== Career ==
In 1985, Skiles founded Karst Productions and continued his underwater film career. Skiles was a proponent of cave divers using their skills to assist with scientific diving projects.

Skiles worked at a dive store in Branford, Florida, named Branford Dive Center. He and fellow cave instructor Gene Broome mapped and laid safety line for many of the underwater spring caves.

Skiles conducted film projects for many groups such as the National Geographic Society. The National Geographic Antarctica expedition allowed him to be the first human to set foot on the Iceberg B-15. His expedition to record deepwater sharks had him diving to a depth of 700 FSW for 11 hours in a "Newtsuit".

Skiles created, directed, and was the cinematographer of the PBS series, Water's Journey. The project, produced by and also featuring Jill Heinerth, was an effort by Skiles to increase public awareness of their groundwater and the hydrogeological cycle.

Skiles' work includes more than one hundred films for television that he filmed, directed, and produced.

== Awards ==
Beneath The Sea recognized Skiles as their "Diver of the Year" for education in 1996.

In 2004, Skiles was awarded the National Academy of Television Arts and Sciences Suncoast Regional Emmy Award for his work on the Water's Journey series.

In 2009, he received the annual HDFEST Deffie Awards for best HD documentary and best cinematography for the Water's Journey series. The awards are given for "accomplishments in High-Definition Indie Filmmaking".

In 2011, Skiles was posthumously awarded National Geographic's "Explorer of the Year" award, jointly with his longtime colleague and friend, Kenny Broad.

== Death ==
Skiles died while on a dive off Boynton Beach, Florida, on July 21, 2010. He signaled to the other divers that he was ascending because his camera was out of memory. His body was found on the reef shortly after that. Attempts to revive him were unsuccessful and he was subsequently pronounced dead at a local hospital. An autopsy showed that Skiles had taken Ambien and Hydrocodone.

Skiles was survived by his wife, Terri, and their two children.

On November 16, 2010, the State Parks division of the Florida Department of Environmental Protection renamed Peacock Springs Park in Skiles' honor.

In 2016, Skiles' widow filed a lawsuit claiming that rebreather equipment malfunctioned causing his death. The manufacturer was cleared of wrongdoing on May 20, 2016, by a Palm Beach County jury.
