= David Apperley =

Australian cave diver

David Apperley is an Australian technical diver and cave explorer. Apperley holds instructor levels in cave diving, Deep Mixed Gas Diving and Deep Closed Circuit Rebreather Diving and was the expedition co-ordinator for the Pearse Resurgence Project 1996–2003. He was the project leader on the Royal Mail Ship Niagara 2003 Survey Project, which involved the organization and planning of putting some of the world's most experienced divers onto the 130-metre-deep Niagara wreck site, off the North Island of New Zealand.

In 2003 Tanya Streeter, world record free diver, employed Apperley to lead a group of safety divers to the British West Indies to act as support for the world record attempt. While support team Leader, Apperley also acted as deep-water support for Tanya on her 160m dive, diving in excess of 150 meters.

In the 2011, Apperley was Safety Diver and stunt double for the character Frank McGuire in the cave diving feature film Sanctum.

== Awards ==
Apperley was the recipient of the inaugural "OZTeK Diver of the Year" award in 2000 for his RMS Niagara and the Pearse River resurgence explorations. He is a founding member and one of the lead exploration divers with the Sydney Project and continues to explore the deep caves and wrecks of Australia & New Zealand. Along with Australian cave divers Paul Hosie and Paul Garske, he has been recognised as a member of the World Exploration Team of Divers in Advanced Diver Magazine.
