= Line marker =

Marker used on cave guide lines to provide safety information to divers

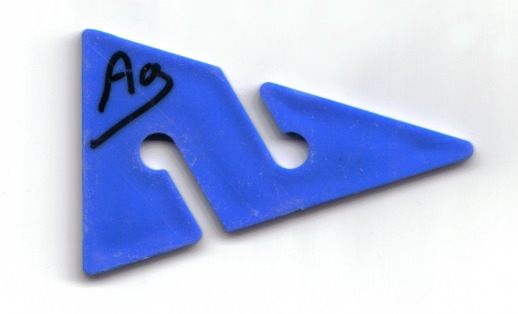
- Line Arrow Marker
- Other names: Line arrow; Directional marker; Dorff arrow; Cave arrow; Cookie; Non-directional marker; Hybrid marker; Referencing exit marker
- Uses: Marking cave guide-line to indicate direction of exit and/or presence and identity of divers further along the line

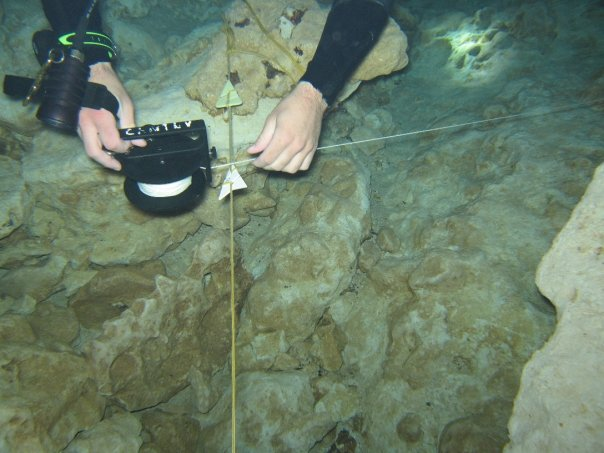
A line arrow on a cave's main guideline pointing to the exit

Illustration showing typical cave line markers and how they are attached to the line for security.: Top: Line arrow - directional information - points along the line leading to the nearest surface with breathable air; Middle: Cookie - non-directional personal marker; Bottom: Hybrid/referencing exit marker - directional personal marker

In cave (and occasionally wreck) diving, line markers are used for orientation as a visual and tactile reference on a permanent guideline. Directional markers (commonly a notched acute isosceles triangle in basic outline), are also known as line arrows or Dorff arrows, and point the way to an exit. Line arrows may mark the location of a "jump" location in a cave when two are placed adjacent to each other. Two adjacent arrows facing away from each other, mark a point in the cave where the diver is equidistant from two exits. Arrow direction can be identified by feel in low visibility.

Non-directional markers ("cookies") are purely personal markers that mark specific spots, or the direction of one's chosen exit at line intersections where there are options. Their shape does not provide a tactile indication of direction as this could cause confusion in low visibility. One important reason to be adequately trained before cave diving is that incorrect marking can confuse and fatally endanger not only oneself, but also other divers.

== History ==
Directional line markers were originally used by non-diving cavers to indicate the direction along a guideline towards an exit. The line arrow was invented by Lewis Holzendorf as a triangle of tape folded over the line, but these had a tendency to slide along the line and were not easy to identify in a silt-out. The concept was further developed by Forrest Wilson at the cave diving NSS workshop, inspired by Sheck Exley and other cave diving pioneers, and later, a few hundreds of the handmade markers were sold through Branford Dive Center in North Florida. Soon they became very popular and today are commonly used by underwater cave explorers.

== Use ==
Line markers are generally used on permanent guidelines to provide critical information to divers following the line. The slots and notches provided are used to wrap the line to secure the marker in place. A simple passage of the line through the enlarged area at the base of the two slots will allow the marker to slide along the line, or even fall off if brushed by a diver. To more securely fasten the marker, an extra wrap may be added at each slot. The basic function of these markers is fairly consistent internationally, but procedures may differ by region, and between teams. The protocol for placement and removal should be well understood by the members of a specific team. Temporary line markers are only for the use of the team who placed them and are removed during exit to avoid littering a cave system with irrelevant and potentially confusing information.

Cave markers may be carried on a short length of bungee with a knot at one end and a clip at the other, but other methods are also used. Reasonable security and easy access are all that is required.

=== Directional markers ===
Line arrows are used to indicate the direction along the line to the nearest air source. In cave systems with only one opening, line arrows will always indicate the route back to the entry, but in cave systems with multiple openings, they may not point to the entry used by the dive team, and in some cases this may not be a usable exit.

Some popular cave diving systems have permanent line arrows at regular intervals pointing to the nearest exit, and may be marked with a distance to the exit. Permanent arrows may also be used to identify secondary passages and midpoints in a cave.

Line arrows are placed to help the divers to establish the direction they come from, when they later need to find the way out, but should not alter the general navigation information of the system, so line arrows are added only where they cannot cause other groups to become confused about the direction to the nearest air source. An arrow would be added at the point of attachment of a reel line when tying off to explore new areas, and may be removed after return and removal of the temporary line. If the place is to be marked for future reference, the arrow may be left in place.

=== Non-directional markers ===
The original non-directional markers in cave diving were clothes pegs, but the circular plastic "cookies" were developed later, based on the successful line-arrow design, and are more secure when placed on a guideline. They can be used to mark reference points, to distinguish lines at an intersection, or can be placed by each member of a team on a jump or gap line to identify who is still on the line if the team gets separated. As they are commonly used to identify the presence of a diver, they generally have some kind of personal identification, such as initials or drawings and may have notches, or holes added so they can be identified by feel.

A non-directional marker indicates the presence of a diver or team beyond a point and is mainly useful for that team. They may be used to indicate the direction the team came from and intend to exit by when the intersection is already marked by arrows, particularly if there are alternatives available which the team does not want to use. To avoid confusing other divers, these temporary markers are removed on the way out.

=== Hybrid markers ===
A hybrid marker, also known as a referencing exit marker or REM, is a more recently developed line marker used as a directional marker by the diver placing it, and seen as a cookie by others. They are rectangular with slots like the arrow and cookie forms for attachment to a line, and have a relatively large blank space on one end to add identification on one side and to write on the other side. Referencing exit markers are asymmetrical so can be used to show the direction which the diver came from. They are personal markers, and should not be used by others to judge the suitability of a route as the practicability of an exit may depend on the size of the diver and the equipment carried.

== Manufacture ==
Originally hand made from available materials. Commercially marketed line markers are commonly injection-moulded plastic and are available in a few colours. Small variations in size and shape allow personal markers to be identified more easily, and unique markings may be added by the user. 3D printing is an alternative method of production which allows easy personalisation.

== See also ==
- Cave diving – Diving in water-filled caves
- Diver communications – Methods used by underwater divers to communicate
- Scuba diving – Swimming underwater, breathing gas carried by the diver
- Subsea marker – Passive identification markers used underwater as identifiers
- Technical diving – Diving beyond the scope of recreational diving
