= Water's Journey: The Hidden Rivers of Florida =

- Directed by: Wes Skiles
- Written by: Jill Heinerth
- Produced by: Wes Skiles (Executive producer); Jill Heinerth (Producer)
- Starring: Wes Skiles; Jill Heinerth; Tom Morris; Brian Pease
- Edited by: Tony Haines
- Distributed by: Karst Productions
- Release date: October 2003
- Running time: 57 minutes
- Country: United States
- Language: English

Water's Journey: The Hidden Rivers of Florida is a documentary film by Wes Skiles that tracks the path of water through the Floridan aquifer, where a team reveals the journey of water above and within the earth. Viewers are shown waters journey form underground to the tap.

== Synopsis ==
The documentary features footage of cave diving to document the path of water. Its purpose is to educate on water conservation.
