= Vortex Spring =

Freshwater spring and recreational dive site in Florida

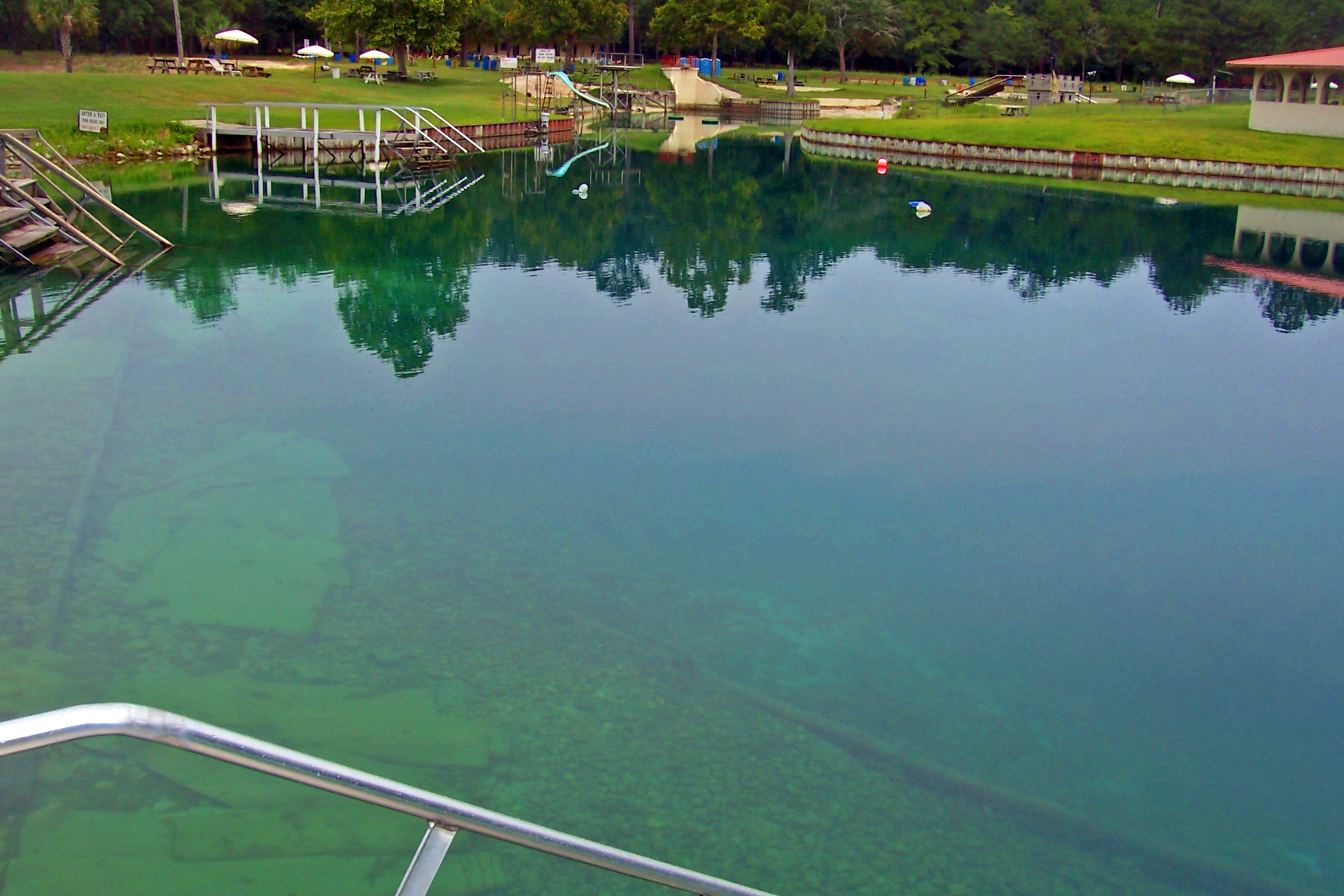
- Main pond at Vortex Spring

- Location within Florida Location within the United States
- Coordinates: 30.77149°N 85.94812°W
- Dive type: Training, Open-water, Deep, Cave
- Depth range: 20 to 115 ft (6.1 to 35.1 m)
- Bottom composition: Rock

Vortex Spring is a commercially operated recreation, camping and dive park located near Ponce de Leon, Florida. It is the largest diving facility in the state of Florida.

== Spring ==
Vortex Spring is a cold freshwater spring that produces approximately 28 million US gallons (110,000 m^{3}) of water daily. The spring consists of a 200 ft (61 m) basin with sloping sides and a cave which links the spring to the Floridan aquifer. Water temperature is steady at 68 °F (20 °C) with no thermocline, and is typically very clear. The spring runoff flows into nearby Otter Creek, which joins Sandy Creek a short distance upstream of Ponce de Leon Spring. There are many fish in the spring; large carp swim in the basin while freshwater eels live in the cave. The cave has been measured to a total of 1,642 feet (500 m).

== Diving ==
Vortex Spring is a popular diving area both for experienced and novice divers. Recreational diver training is offered at the park. There are two underwater training platforms at 20 feet (6.1 m) which are often used for Open Water certification dives, and an inverted metal "talk box" that traps air, allowing divers to remove their regulators and talk to each other while under the surface. The cavern entrance is at 58 feet (18 m) below the surface, and has an opening of 9 by 12 feet (2.7 m × 3.7 m). A handrail is mounted along the wall of the cave. The cave is accessible to 310 feet (94 m), further passage is blocked by a steel grate. Experienced divers are allowed to dive to 115 feet (35 m).

== The site ==
At the site, many facilities are provided for visitors. Lodging, dive shop, and changing rooms with heated showers are on site. Recreational features include diving boards, rope swings, and slides into the swimming area. Camping facilities, picnic areas, a basketball court, volleyball court, paddle boats, floats, and canoes are also provided.

== Deaths ==
During the early 1990s, 13 divers died while exploring the cave. The state of Florida threatened to ban diving near cave entrances as a result of frequent cave diving accidents, but local divers responded by developing a special cave diving certification that became the standard requirement for sections of underwater caves known to be particularly hazardous. Vortex Spring complied with this by erecting a locked underwater gate at the entrance to the dangerous section of the cave. Only those who have valid cave diving certificates are permitted to enter, requiring a staff member to unlock the gate, and typically accompany them during the dive.

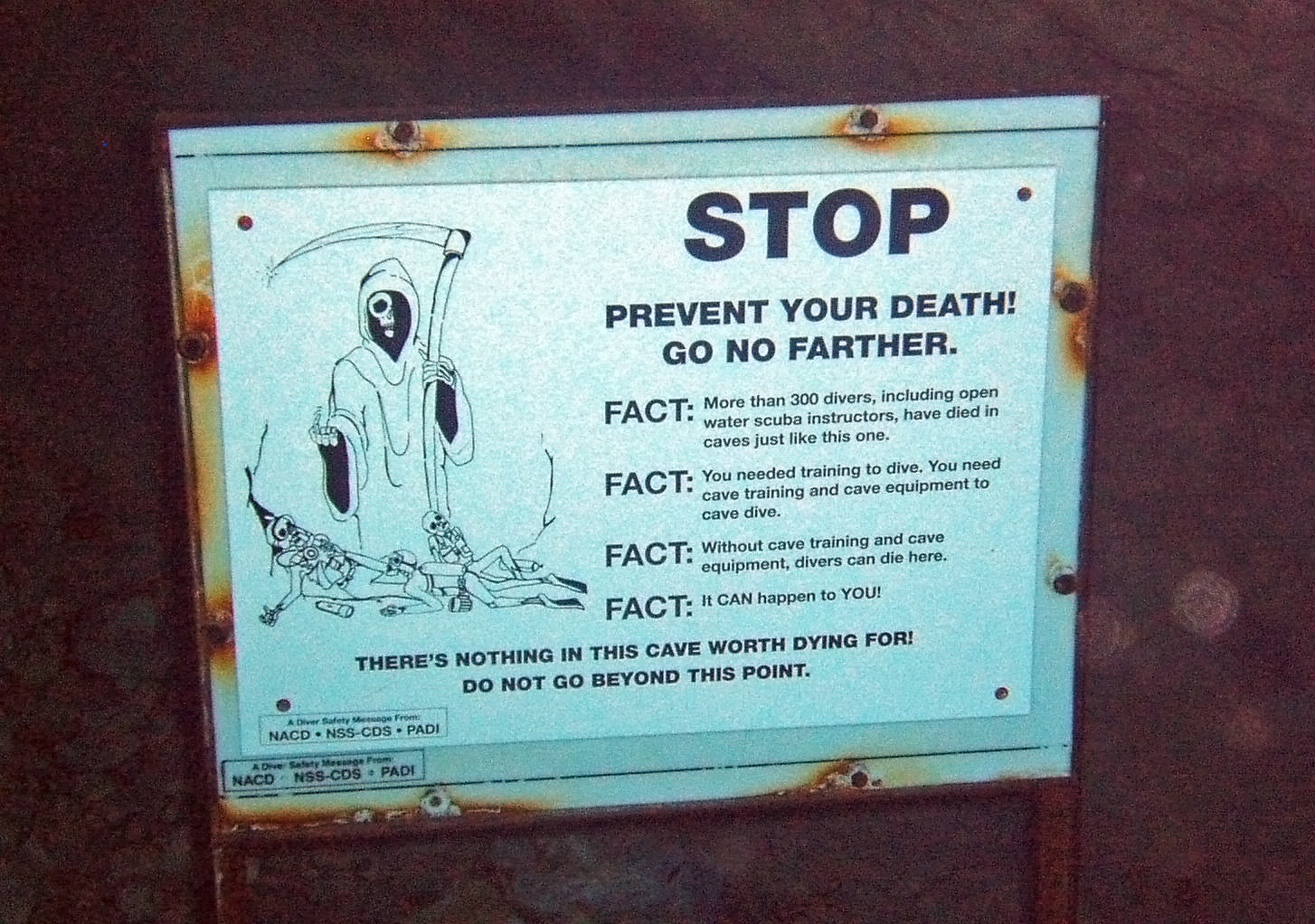
Warning sign near the entrance to the cave

In 2010, Ben McDaniel, a diver who was not certified for cave diving, but had been witnessed by staff and other divers gaining access to the restricted area of the cave by forcing open the gate, did not resurface after an employee let him through the gate one evening. It was initially assumed that he had died accidentally after becoming trapped underwater, but extensive searches did not find his body, nor any sign that one was present in the remote recesses of the cave.

In 2012, another diver, Larry Higginbotham, died in the cave, believed by those who recovered him to have been searching for McDaniel's body, motivated by a large reward offered by McDaniel's parents, which they rescinded after news of the event.

== See also ==
- Nutty Putty Cave
