= Disappearance of Ben McDaniel =

Scuba diver who disappeared during or after a cave dive

Coordinates: 30.77149°N 85.94812°W

Benjamin J. McDaniel
- McDaniel in diving gear
- Born: April 15, 1980; Memphis, Tennessee, US
- Disappeared: August 18, 2010 (aged 30); Vortex Spring, Florida
- Status: Missing for 16 years, 1 month and 3 days
- Known for: Disappearance while scuba diving
- Height: 6 ft 1 in (185cm)

On August 20, 2010, 30-year-old Ben McDaniel, of Memphis, Tennessee, United States, was reported missing after employees in the dive shop at Vortex Spring, north of Ponce de Leon, Florida, noticed that his pickup truck had remained in the shop's parking lot for the previous two days. McDaniel, who had been diving regularly at the spring while living in his parents' nearby beach house, had last been seen by two of those employees on the evening of August 18, on a dive entering a cave 58 feet (18 m) below the water's surface. While he was initially believed to have drowned on that dive, and his parents still strongly believe his body is in an inaccessible reach of the extensive cave system, no trace of him has ever been found. The state of Florida issued his family a death certificate in 2013.

McDaniel had been living at his parents' beach house on the Emerald Coast during a sabbatical in the wake of a divorce, a business failure, and the death of his younger brother two years earlier. An avid diver since his teens, he had been a regular at the spring, where he had apparently been covertly exploring the cave despite lacking the required certification. Lengthy searches have only located some anomalously placed and filled decompression tanks; many of the divers who took part in those searches believe that if McDaniel is indeed dead, his body is not in the cave as he was too large to enter its narrower passages. The McDaniels devoted their family's extensive financial resources to the search, at one point guaranteeing the replacement cost of a remotely operated underwater vehicle (ROV). A reward they offered was rescinded in 2012 after the death of another diver who may have been trying to collect it, vindicating the criticism of the divers who had warned of that possibility and resented the McDaniels' insinuation that those who had searched for their son at great personal risk had not been "brave" enough.

Although the McDaniels continue to believe that his body is in an area of the cave beyond the reach of current search capabilities, they have also entertained the possibility that his death was not an accident but the result of foul play. A private investigator they hired believes that his body may have been removed before any authorities were contacted, or that he may even have been murdered on land and the narrative of his disappearance fabricated as a cover story.

A segment of Investigation Discovery's Disappeared was devoted to the case, as well as Ben's Vortex, a documentary co-directed by diver Jill Heinerth. In addition to the accident and murder theories, the documentary also considers the possibility that McDaniel staged the disappearance to escape a troubled recent past that included a divorce and financial setbacks. The McDaniels have vehemently rejected that theory, pointing to the dog and girlfriend he left behind as well as doubting that he would have knowingly subjected them to that level of grief after seeing how his brother's death had affected them.

== Background ==
Ben McDaniel was born on April 15, 1980. He was the oldest of three sons born to Shelby and Patty McDaniel, a wealthy couple who lived in Collierville, Tennessee, outside Memphis. In the late 2000s, he was going through a difficult period in his life. He had returned to live with his parents after his marriage ended in divorce and his construction business failed, the latter leaving him with tax debts of almost $50,000 to the Internal Revenue Service and the state of Tennessee.

He was also still grieving for his younger brother Paul, a frequent rock climbing partner during their youth, who died in 2008 at the age of 22 from a stroke. He had found Paul unconscious in the family home and tried to revive him; he later became active in raising money for the foundation his parents established to support research into prevention and treatment of strokes. Later, it was revealed that Paul's cause of death was "anoxic encephalopathy due to combined drug (opiate/benzodiazepine) toxicity"; a drug overdose, not a stroke. Paul had not been prescribed opiates.

His parents suggested their son take a sabbatical, offering to support him financially while he and his dog, a chocolate Labrador he had rescued, lived in the family's beach home at Santa Rosa Beach on the Emerald Coast of the Florida Panhandle. He accepted the offer and moved into the house in April 2010. His parents and girlfriend say the move was proving beneficial, as McDaniel was beginning to think and talk about moving on from his recent personal setbacks.

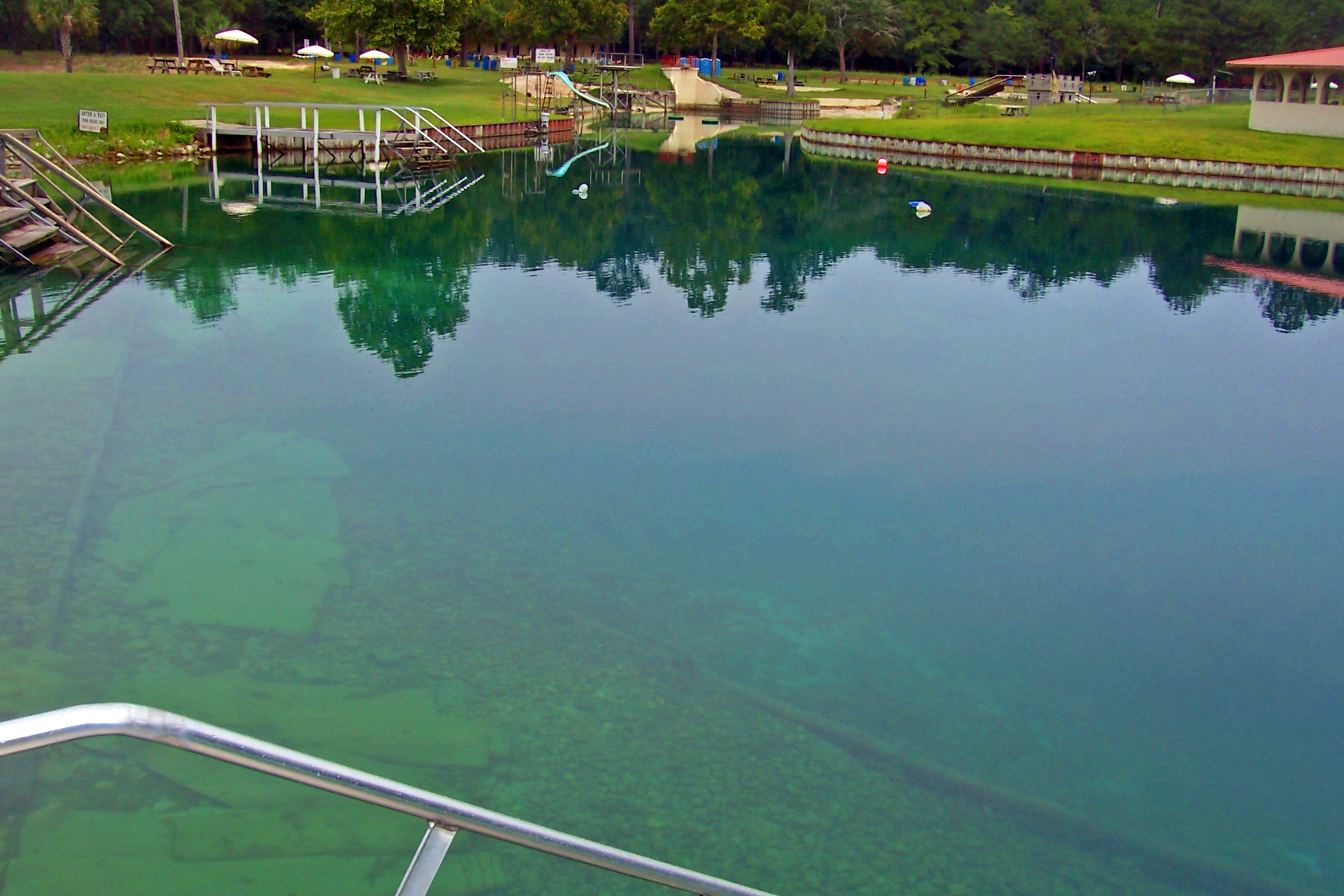
Vortex Spring

Relocating to the Gulf Coast allowed McDaniel to indulge in his preferred hobby, scuba diving. He had first taken it up at the age of 15, practicing with his tanks in the family pool. Despite living on the coast during his sabbatical, he preferred to dive in fresh water, becoming a frequent visitor to Vortex Spring, located inland a short distance north of Ponce de Leon.

=== Vortex Spring ===
At Vortex Spring, which claims on its website to be the largest diving facility in the state, divers descend into clear waters at a constant temperature of 68 °F (20 °C) fed by the Floridan Aquifer. Diving instruction is offered for all levels; experienced divers come for the underwater wildlife and the cavern, which begins 58 feet (18 m) below the surface. All divers are required to present proof of open-water certification and sign a release of liability.

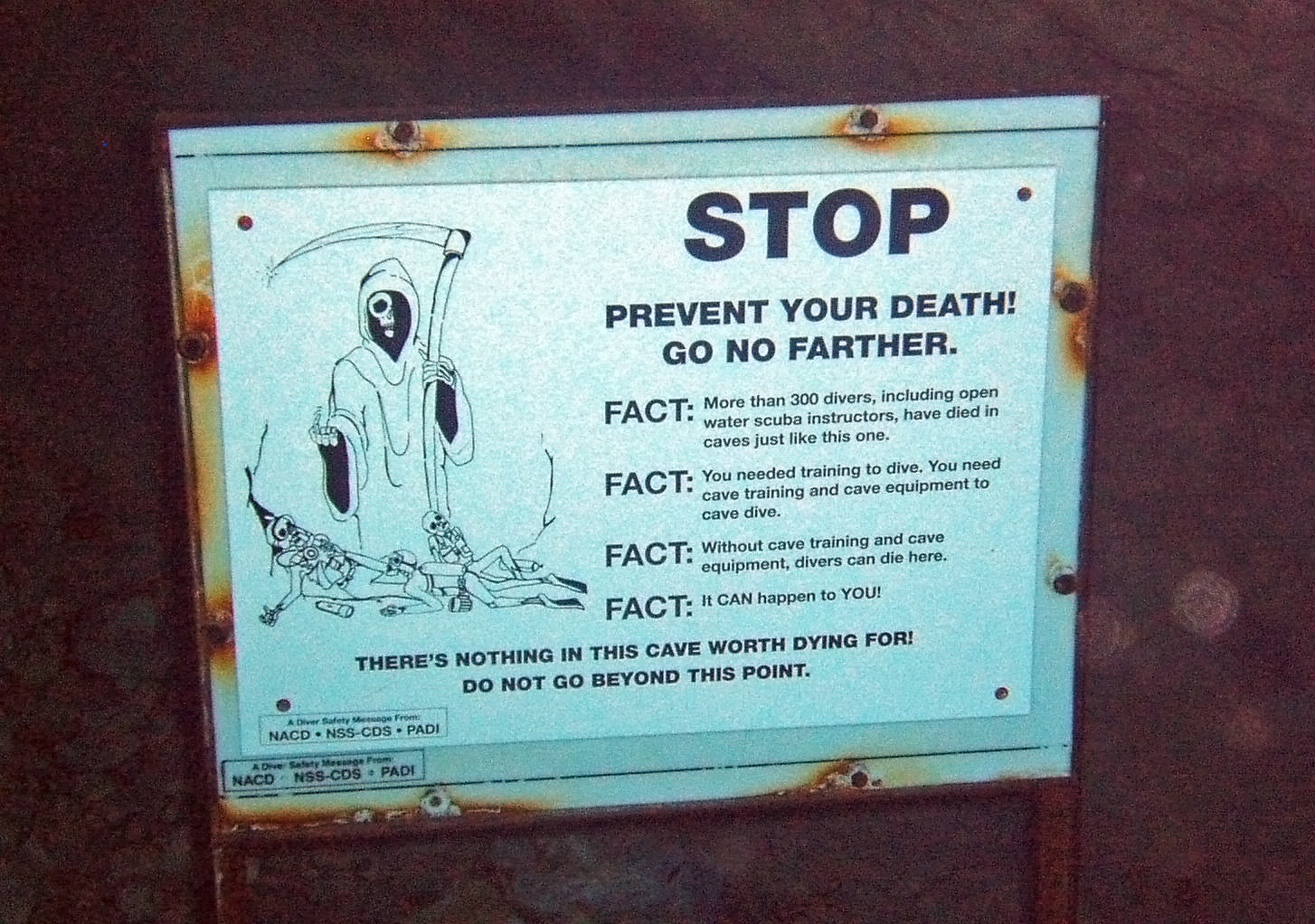
Warning sign near the entrance to the cave

For the most experienced divers, the main attraction of Vortex Spring is the cave, which starts 300 feet (91 m) from the cavern, at a depth of 115 feet (35 m). At the entrance is a sign depicting the Grim Reaper which warns divers of the dangers of continuing onward. The cave steadily narrows, reaching a makeshift rebar gate with a chain and padlock, at a point almost 300 feet (91 m) from the entrance. The dive shop withheld the gate key, unless a diver showed proof of cave diving certification, which requires two months' training including 125 dives with an instructor or certified diving partner. This policy was instituted after the deaths of 13 divers in the cave during the 1990s, and in response to threats from the state to ban diving in the cave entirely. Beginning at the gate, over 1,600 feet (490 m) through the area's limestone bedrock have been mapped, to a depth of 310 feet (94 m); the cave's full extent is unknown. At some points, the passage narrows to 10 inches (25 cm), requiring divers to remove their tanks, push them forward through the passage, and then twist their bodies to follow.

McDaniel's dives at the site were regular enough that the dive shop employees and other frequent visitors came to know him. One of the employees, Chuck Cronin, believed that while McDaniel had the proper equipment and considerable diving knowledge, he was often overly confident in his abilities and not shy about saying so. That opinion, the Memphis Commercial Appeal later reported, was shared by posters on a scuba diving website, scubaboard.com, who had also met McDaniel during trips to Vortex Spring. (According to a 2014 online comment by his father, he could not find anyone at Vortex Spring willing to be his diving partner, so he did his dives alone.) His parents later defended him from those criticisms by seeing them as positive traits. "Ben was brave," his father later said. "Ben was fearless. He followed his passions."

== Disappearance ==
In mid-August, four months into his Florida sojourn, McDaniel returned to Tennessee for a week. His parents and girlfriend, Emily Greer, said he seemed optimistic. He told them he was working on getting certified as an instructor so he could find a job and that he was researching cave diving with an eye toward getting that certification as well. On his nights out with Greer, he told her of plans to eventually start a diving-related business. On the weekend of August 14–15, he returned to Florida, leaving behind a letter thanking his parents for the sabbatical and promising to look after them as they grew older. They never saw him again.

On August 18, the Wednesday after he returned to the Santa Rosa Beach house, he went up to Vortex Spring again. In the middle of the day, he did one dive. Other divers saw him looking closely at the area around the cave entrance as if he was planning something. After resurfacing, he was recorded on security cameras making a transaction to fill his tanks at the dive shop. He spent much of the rest of the afternoon by himself alongside the spring, witnesses said, testing equipment and making notes in his dive log.

The day had been hot, with temperatures around 90 °F (32 °C), and as evening came McDaniel began preparing for another dive. He called his mother on his cell phone, the last contact he had with his family. Around 7:30 p.m., as the sun began to set, he went in again.

Cronin and fellow employee Eduardo Taran, on their way back from a dive themselves – something they often did on Wednesdays after the shop closed – saw McDaniel as he began descending, with his lights on and wearing a helmet, suggesting he was venturing into the cave. Taran, who had suspected for some time that Ben was forcing the gate open, went down to him and unlocked it, watching McDaniel go in and then returning to Cronin. No one is known to have seen him since.

On some nights when they had seen McDaniel dive late, the two had stayed at the spring after resurfacing until they saw bubbles on the surface, indicating that he was beginning to decompress in order to safely resurface. On the night of the 18th, they instead went back to Taran's house for coffee.

McDaniel's truck was still in the parking lot the next morning, but with many visitors the employees said they were too busy to notice. They did see the truck the next morning. After determining that no one else had seen McDaniel, Taran called the Holmes County sheriff's office.

== Search ==
Upon arrival, the sheriff's deputies sealed off the spring with crime-scene tape. McDaniel's tanks, wet suit and other diving equipment were not present and there were no signs of a struggle near his truck or anywhere else he could have been. His wallet, with almost $1,100 in cash, and cell phone were in the cab of his truck; dive logs showed that he had explored the cave and a map he made was also found.

At the Santa Rosa Beach house officers found his dog, hungry from having been unfed for two days. Based on these circumstances, police and dive shop employees assumed that he had never resurfaced and had in all probability drowned somewhere in the cave trying to get out. Cadaver dogs alerted on the water surface, further supporting that theory.

Reports of a missing diver in the Vortex Spring cave spread and other cave divers volunteered for what they assumed would be a recovery operation, taking advantage of the weekend. McDaniel's parents were called, and they drove to Florida, along with Greer, to observe from the shore. News media in the Panhandle and Memphis followed the search closely.

Captain Harry Hamilton, an investigator in Holmes County, assumed at first that a very large number of divers, both amateur and expert, would volunteer to search for and recover McDaniel's body. He soon realized that very few divers "in the world" possessed the training and skill to attempt such a dangerous cave diving recovery. Experienced divers scoured the cave, investigating small crevices and fissures McDaniel might have entered in a panicked attempt to exit the cave as his tanks ran low, which was a pattern found in other cave diving deaths. It was risky work, and one diver said they had nearly died during the search. Multiple divers searched through the weekend, but did not find McDaniel.

=== Discovery of tanks ===
Two tanks known to belong to McDaniel were found near the entrance to the cave. This discovery struck some searchers as inconsistent with McDaniel's supposed intent to explore the cave, as cave divers usually place extra "air" tanks for decompression at points along their exit route, and not only at the entrance to the cave. When tested, the tanks were found to contain normal air and not the specialized gas mix required for diving at depth. McDaniel would have been aware of this requirement, if he had been researching cave diving as his parents reported.

More detailed information regarding tanks was given in the Ben's Vortex documentary. Three tanks believed to belong to McDaniel were recovered. Tank one, an "aluminum 80" (80 cubic ft capacity), full tank with a regulator, was found 200 feet (61 m) inside the cave. Two other tanks, lacking regulators, were attached to the "talk box" (an inverted metal box that traps air, allowing divers to remove their regulators and talk to each other while under the surface) in the outer cavern area (Piano Room) where the talk box was located at the time. All contained normal air, not a specialized gas mix. The talk box, originally located in the Piano Room of the cave, was moved to the basin area of Vortex Springs and is now at a depth of only 21 feet (6.4 m).

=== Searches by recovery specialist ===
By Sunday, August 22, no other signs of McDaniel had been found. Edd Sorenson, a veteran cave diver and recovery specialist with nearly 2,500 logged dives, received a text message from his wife. At the time, he was leading an expedition based on a yacht in the Bahamas. He arrived at Vortex Springs the next day. Other divers, and an official with International Underwater Cave Rescue and Recovery, told him it was too dangerous to search any deeper into the cave.

Sorenson, who has been described by the Tampa Bay Times as being able to go where other divers cannot, persisted. He made three separate dives that day, going (by his account) 1,700 feet (520 m) into the cave, 200 feet (61 m) farther than those sections McDaniel had mapped, using a diver propulsion vehicle and smaller tanks to increase his range. He found nothing – no body, and no evidence of one such as increased activity by carnivorous aquatic scavengers, nor any evidence that McDaniel had gotten into those sections, such as marks on the cave walls or disturbed silt.

McDaniel was 6 feet 1 inch (185 cm) tall and weighed 210 pounds (95 kg), one inch (2.5 cm) taller and 20 pounds (9.1 kg) heavier than Sorenson. Without cave diving training, Sorenson said, there was no way McDaniel could have gotten through some of the narrower passages, called restrictions by divers, in the cave. "I know what I'm doing and I barely made it through," he told the Commercial Appeal. "The last place I searched was pristine, without a mark that a diver had been there. It would be impossible to go through that restriction without making a mark on the floor or ceiling. He's not in there."

=== Mapper and ROV efforts ===
McDaniel's parents hired Steve Keene, who had originally mapped the Vortex Spring cave in 2003, to look. After seven dives, he apologized to them for not finding any fresh sign of McDaniel. "If he's in there, I don't know where he'd be," he said later. They agreed to put up $54,000 to guarantee the cost of replacing a remotely operated underwater vehicle brought to the spring by the Fort Lauderdale police, in case it was lost in the cave. Due to technical issues, it was unable to go any farther than the human divers had ventured. In total, 16 divers spent 36 days looking for McDaniel's body in the cave with no results. Volunteer searches continued afterwards at the spring through November, often with McDaniel's parents and Greer in attendance.

=== Searches on land ===
With the cave thoroughly searched, some divers began questioning whether McDaniel was there at all. Perhaps his body had been secretly removed from the cave before searching began and disposed of on land or it had washed out through the spring's outlet. Others, including Cronin and Lowell Kelly, Vortex Spring's owner at the time, suggested he had staged his own disappearance to start his life over under another identity and escape his past troubles. Authorities began to consider these possibilities and adjust their search.

The cadaver dogs searched the woods around Vortex Spring without success. Assisted by helicopters, they searched the swamps along the spring's outflow into Blue Creek and Sandy Creek to the Choctawhatchee River. Thirty separate tests of the water over the next several months showed no sign of an increase in the bacteria that would indicate the presence of a decomposing human body. Taran, who said he had let McDaniel into the cave despite knowing he lacked certification to dive in it, passed a polygraph test of his account.

=== Reward offer and controversy ===
Frustrated by the limitations the search had thus far encountered, and believing that McDaniel's body was in an area of the cave no one had yet reached, McDaniel's parents offered a reward of $10,000, raised from money contributed at a benefit held on what would have been their son's 31st birthday, at the end of the year to anyone "brave" enough to go to those places and find it. The insinuation of cowardice alienated divers who had already risked their lives searching the cave, and raised fears among them that it would only encourage untrained divers to enter the cave and take potentially fatal risks for the reward money. Undeterred, McDaniel's parents increased the award, twice.

In March 2012, by which time the reward had been increased to $30,000, the fears of the cave divers were realized. Two days before the Investigation Discovery cable channel series Disappeared aired a segment on McDaniel's case, a diver from Biloxi, Mississippi, Larry Higginbotham, died in the cavern at Vortex Spring. His body was found the next day after he, too, had failed to return from a dive. "He just got himself in a pinch and couldn't find his way back out", said one of the divers who recovered the body.

There was no explicit evidence that Higginbotham was trying to find McDaniel and claim the reward, but the divers who recovered his body believed he was. "He was found near a shovel left near a restriction so small that no one could get through it," said Sorenson, who had pulled Higginbotham's body back through four tight restrictions.

The following month, amid increasing criticism, McDaniel's parents rescinded the reward offer. "Not only did it endanger the lives of divers who would risk going farther than they should," said Sorenson, who was by then even more firmly convinced that their son had not died in the cave, "it put all of our lives at risk because we have to go in to recover the bodies." By that time, McDaniel's parents had also come to believe that, if he had not died in the cave, he had been murdered. A phone tip line they set up had not received any calls, and no one who had not yet said anything was likely to be further motivated to do so, they said. McDaniel's father elaborated the following year that the family was told to rescind the reward while in the Vortex Spring area for this reason.

McDaniel's mother did not believe McDaniel had any intention of abandoning his life. He had left his dog in Santa Rosa Beach and had not given Greer any indication of such plans. She stated he had seen the impact Paul's death had had on his parents.

== Subsequent investigations ==
By 2011, it seemed unlikely that McDaniel's body would be found in the cave. McDaniel's parents began considering the possibility that he had died as a result of foul play, and that his diving disappearance was staged to cover up a crime. Or, perhaps he had been found dead by the dive shop staff, who feared the consequences of that discovery. They hired a Florida private investigator, Lynn-Marie Carty, who found that other people associated with Vortex Spring besides Kelly had criminal records. "There is just as much reason to look above the water for Ben's body as there was to look below it in the cave," she told the Commercial Appeal.

Some other events reported to have occurred on the day McDaniel disappeared supported that theory. Kelly said shortly afterwards that on that evening, a "wild-eyed" and apparently drunk man appeared at the shop and asked if it was too late to dive; the possibility has been raised that this man, if he existed, may have been involved. Earlier that day, a diver had had a confrontation with several teenagers on the property about their drinking; they eventually left but may have come back in an attempt to exact revenge.

In March 2012, McDaniel's parents arranged for cadaver dogs to search the area of the springs again, but with no results.

=== Ben's Vortex ===
Canadian diver Jill Heinerth and her husband Robert McClellan, both certified cave divers and documentary filmmakers, went to Vortex Spring to make a short video. They hoped to show it to the McDaniel family in the hopes of giving them a better understanding of the risks associated with cave diving. At the time, Heinerth believed that McDaniel's body was not in the cave's depths; however, during the research process, she read McDaniel's dive logs and map and concluded that he had gotten very far into the cave. She theorized that McDaniel may have burrowed deeper into a narrow crevice. Heinerth and McClellan turned their private video short into a feature-length documentary, Ben's Vortex, released in 2012.

== See also ==
- List of people who disappeared mysteriously: post-1970
- List of Disappeared episodes
