= Jill Heinerth =

Canadian cave diver (born 1965)

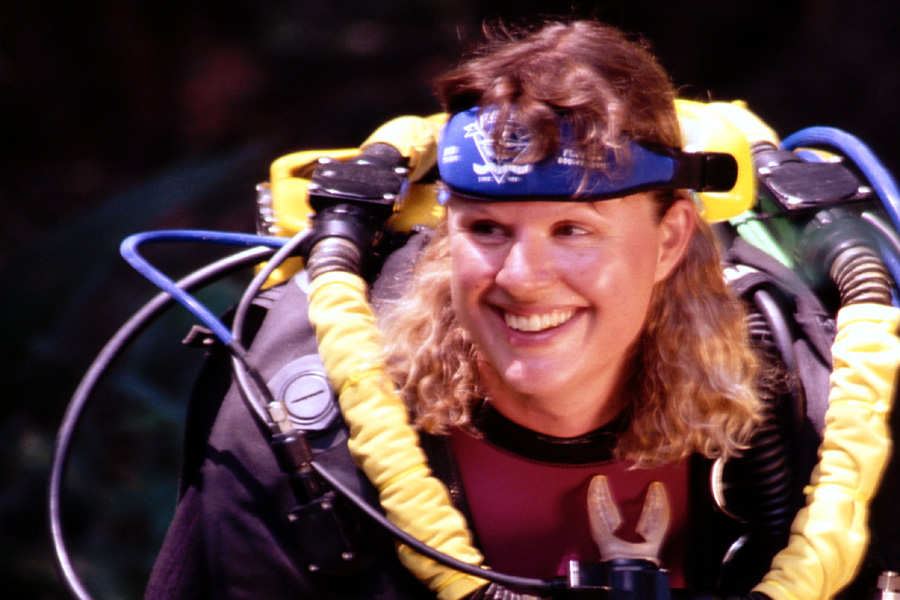
- Jill Heinerth
- Born: January 1965 (age 61); Toronto, Canada
- Occupations: Explorer, author, underwater photographer, public speaker, educator, cave diver
- Spouses: Paul Heinerth (m. 1996, divorced) Robert McClellan (m. 2007)
- Website: www.intotheplanet.com

Jill Heinerth (born 1965) is a Canadian cave diver, underwater explorer, writer, photographer and film-maker. She has made TV series for PBS, National Geographic Channel and the BBC, consulted on movies for directors including James Cameron, and written several books and produced documentaries, including We Are Water and Ben's Vortex, about the disappearance of Ben McDaniel.

== Early life and education ==
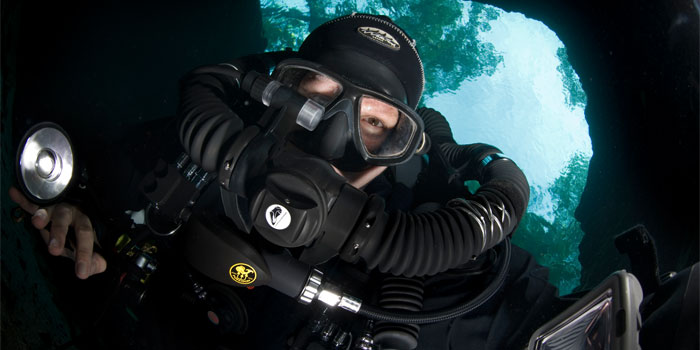
Jill Heinerth diving

As a child, Jill was inspired by Jacques Cousteau's television series. In 5th grade, she gave a Science Fair project about mysterious disappearances in the Bermuda Triangle. She gained a Bachelor of Fine Arts in Visual Communications Design at York University, and ran a small graphic design agency in Toronto while teaching scuba in Lake Huron's port of Tobermory in the evenings. In 2023 Heinerth was awarded an honorary PhD from Victoria University in the University of Toronto.

== Career ==
In 1991, Heinerth quit her office job and moved to the Cayman Islands to dive full-time, honing skills in underwater photography. She then moved to Florida to work on cave diving, where she was mentored by documentary filmmaker Wes Skiles. She collaborated with his Karst Productions, based in High Springs, Florida.

In 1998, Heinerth was part of the team that made the first 3D map of an underwater cave. Heinerth became the first person to dive the iceberg caves of Antarctica, penetrating further into an underwater cave system than any woman ever In 2001, she was part of a team that explored ice caves of icebergs where she and her then husband Paul Heinerth "discovered wondrous life and magical vistas" and experienced the calving of an iceberg, documented in the film Ice Island.

In 2015, Heinerth participated in exploring the numerous anchialine caves of Christmas Island.

In 2016, Heinerth led an expedition that explored and surveyed the flooded Bell Island Mines in Newfoundland and Labrador, Canada.

Heinerth is a Fellow of The Explorers Club and the inaugural Explorer-in-Residence of the Royal Canadian Geographical Society.

She consults on training programmes for diving agencies, publishes photojournalism in a range of magazines and speaks around the world.

Heinerth has written opinion pieces and articles about exploration and climate change for global publications including the Los Angeles Times.

In 2020, Heinerth spoke with the podcast This is Love about diving in ice caves in Antarctica.

Jill Heinerth is a public speaker and educator represented by Speaker's Spotlight agency.

In 2020, Heinerth was interviewed on many radio, TV and podcasts programs including the NPR radio program Fresh Air.

In August 2022, Heinerth led a team of expeditionary technical divers who confirmed and photographed a lost, sunken WWII bomber at the bottom of Gander Lake in Newfoundland.

Heinerth was a member of a Royal Canadian Geographical Society team that discovered the wreckage of the Quest, the polar exploration vessel of the Shackleton–Rowett Expedition of 1921–1922 on which Sir Ernest Shackleton died in 1922.The wreck was found in 390 metres of water on the seabed of the Labrador Sea roughly 80 km off Labrador's coast, sitting almost upright, and appearing to be broadly intact.

Jill Heinerth is the subject of the award-winning feature documentary film Diving Into The Darkness, produced by Running Cloud Productions and directed by Nays Baghai. The 2024 film won the feature documentary award at the Santa Barbara International Film Festival.

== Personal life ==
Heinerth married cave diver Paul Heinerth in 1996; they later divorced. In April 2007, she married her second husband, writer, photographer, and new media expert Robert McClellan, with whom she lives in Carleton Place, Ontario, Canada. Heinerth has described her hobbies as hiking, kayaking and cycling; "My favorite pastime is getting up at dawn and cycling to my local spring where a robust swim against the current of the Santa Fe River starts my day on the right track."

== Works ==
=== Bibliography ===
- Heinerth, Jill; Oigarden, B (2008). Cave diving articles & opinions: A comprehensive guide to cave diving and exploration. High Springs, FL: Heinerth Productions, Inc. p. 320.
- Heinerth, Jill (2010). Digital Underwater Photography: Jill Heinerth's Guide to Digital Underwater Photograph. Heinerth Productions Incorporated. ISBN 978-0979878923.
- Heinerth, Jill (2014). The Essentials of Cave Diving (Second ed.). HEINERTH PROD Incorporated. ISBN 978-0979878947.
- Kakuk, Brian; Heinerth, Jill (2010). Side Mount Profiles. Heinerth Productions Incorporated. ISBN 978-0979878954.
- Heinerth, Jill (2014). The Basics of Rebreather Diving. Heinerth Productions, Inc. ISBN 978-1940944005.
- Heinerth, Jill (2014). Women Underwater. Heinerth Productions, Inc. ISBN 978-1940944012.
- Heinerth, Jill; Pinto, Lesli (2015). Chester the Manatee and the Very, Very, Terribly Bad Itch. Heinerth Productions, Inc. ISBN 978-1940944081.
- Heinerth, Jill (2016). The Scuba Diver's Guide to Underwater Video: GoPro to Professional Filmmaking. Heinerth Productions, Inc. p. 126. ISBN 978-1940944210.
- Heinerth, Jill (2019). Into The Planet: My Life as a Cave Diver. Ecco. ISBN 978-0062691545
- Heinerth, Jill (2021). The Aquanaut. Tundra Books. ISBN 978-0735263635

=== Film ===
Heinerth has produced TV series for PBS, National Geographic Channel, Discovery Channel and the BBC, consulted on movies for directors including James Cameron. She has produced documentaries including We Are Water and Ben's Vortex.

Jill hosted and shot underwater videography for the Under Thin Ice episode of on the CBC Television Network. Produced by GalaFilm of Montreal, Canada. In 2026 Jill Heinerth was featured as a technical iceberg diver and featured presenter on "The Berg" episode of CBC's The Nature of Things.

== Awards ==
In 2012, Heinerth was named the "Sea Hero of the Year" by SCUBA Diving Magazine.

Heinerth is a member of the Explorers Club, a fellow of the National Speleological Society, and she has been inducted into the Women Divers Hall of Fame. She won the OZTek Media Award in March 2013. In November 2013, she was awarded the first ever Christopher Ondaatje Medal for Exploration by the Royal Canadian Geographical Society.

In June 2016, Heinerth was named as the first Explorer-in-Residence for the Royal Canadian Geographical Society.

In January 2017, the Academy of Underwater Arts and Sciences announced that Jill Heinerth was to become a 2017 AUAS Fellow by receiving an NOGI Award for 'Sports & Education'.

Later that year, on 7 March 2017, the Governor General of Canada announced that Jill Heinerth was to receive the Canadian Polar Medal.

In March 2018 Jill Heinerth was awarded the Beneath The Sea Diver of the Year (Education) Award.

On 18 August 2020 it was announced that Jill Heinerth would be inducted into the International SCUBA Diving Hall of Fame. Due to the COVID-19 pandemic the induction will be delayed until 2021.

In February 2021 Jill's Children's book The Aquanaut was selected by Dolly Parton as a Blue Ribbon Selection of Dolly Parton's Imagination Library.

Jill Heinerth was named as the 2024 Honorary Ottawa Riverkeeper at the Riverkeeper's annual gala on 29 May 2024.

In 2025, Heinerth received the King Charles III Coronation Medal.

Heinerth received the 2026 21st Century Adventurer Award, presented by Defender and the European Outdoor Film Tour (EOFT).
