= Subsea marker =

Passive identification markers used underwater as identifiers

Subsea markers are passive identification markers used underwater to identify equipment or a designated workspace. As subsea equipment may be covered in underwater growth like seaweed, kelp and algae, special non-fouling materials are sometimes utilized for equipment marking to ensure these are readable even after prolonged periods of submergence.

Some subsea markers are made from a durable rubber which has been manufactured to include synthetic oils. The oil is evenly distributed through the material and gives the material excellent hydrophobic properties. The hydrophobic properties of the material prevent marine growth from attaching to the surface of the marker making it readable even after several years of submersion under water.

== Applications ==
Subsea markers are typically used to identify equipment in the oil industry. Alternative uses are for marking fish like sharks and whales. Subsea markers could also be used in sewage systems or to mark shipwrecks for divers.
