= Paul Hosie =

Australian cave diver

Paul Hosie (born 30 June 1967) is an Australian cave diver.

Hosie gained his Cave Diving qualification in 1997. Over the past ten years, Hosie has been involved in the discovery and mapping of over 10,000m of new cave passages in Australia. This has included the exploration of remote cave diving sites in Australia including Kija Blue Sinkhole in Australia's Kimberley region (ADM Issue 24/2006 ). Hosie has been recognised as a member of the World Exploration Team of Divers in Advanced Diver Magazine and was the recipient of the 2003 Oztek Diver of the Year Award. In 2007, Hosie was awarded the National Speleological Society (USA) Cave Diving Section - Exploration Award along with his team members for the exploration of Kija Blue Sinkhole Hosie has been active in the caving community in WA. He is currently exploring the area of Eneabba to find new caves and pay homage to Jeff Butt, who was the inspiration for the inaugural Australian Speleological Federation Award for Exploration that he was awarded in 2007 from the Australian Speleological Federation.

== Awards ==
- 2003: OZTek Australasian Diver of the Year
- 2007: Jeff Butt exploration award, Australian Speleological Federation
- 2007: National Speleological Society (USA) Cave Diving Section - Exploration Award
