= Cave diving =

Diving in water-filled caves

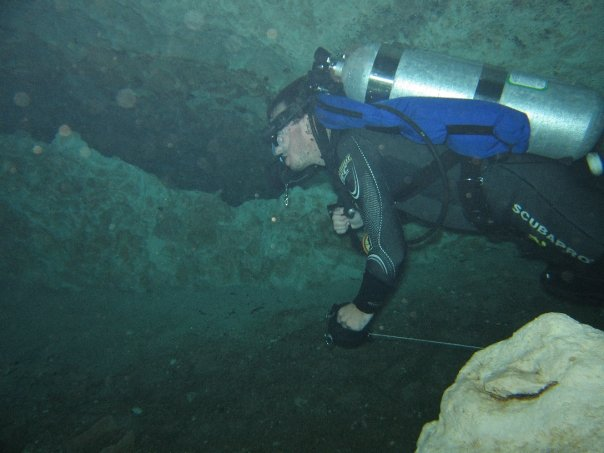
A cave diver running a reel with guide line into the overhead environment

Cave diving is underwater diving in water-filled caves. It may be done as an extreme sport, a way of exploring flooded caves for scientific investigation, or for the search for and recovery of divers or, as in the 2018 Thai cave rescue, other cave users. The equipment used varies depending on the circumstances, and ranges from breath hold to surface supplied, but almost all cave-diving is done using scuba equipment, often in specialised configurations with redundancies such as sidemount or backmounted twinset. Recreational cave-diving is generally considered to be a type of technical diving due to the lack of a free surface during large parts of the dive, and often involves planned decompression stops. A distinction is made by recreational diver training agencies between cave-diving and cavern-diving, where cavern diving is deemed to be diving in those parts of a cave where the exit to open water can be seen by natural light. An arbitrary distance limit to the open water surface may also be specified.

Equipment, procedures, and the requisite skills have been developed to reduce the risk of becoming lost in a flooded cave, and consequently drowning when the breathing gas supply runs out. The equipment aspect largely involves the provision of an adequate breathing gas supply to cover reasonably foreseeable contingencies, redundant dive lights and other safety critical equipment, and the use of a continuous guideline leading the divers back out of the overhead environment. The skills and procedures include effective management of the equipment, and procedures to recover from foreseeable contingencies and emergencies, both by individual divers, and by the teams that dive together.

In the United Kingdom, cave-diving developed from the locally more common activity of caving. Its origins in the United States are more closely associated with recreational scuba diving. Compared to caving and scuba diving, there are relatively few practitioners of cave-diving. This is due in part to the specialized equipment and skill sets required, and in part because of the high potential risks due to the specific environment.

Despite these risks, water-filled caves attract scuba divers, cavers, and speleologists due to their often unexplored nature, and present divers with a technical diving challenge. Underwater caves have a wide range of physical features, and can contain fauna not found elsewhere. Several organisations dedicated to cave diving safety and exploration exist, and several agencies provide specialised training in the skills and procedures considered necessary for acceptable safety.

== Environments ==
Two types of overhead diving environment are defined in recreational cave diving: Both a cave or a cavern are natural voids under the Earth's surface.

The formation and development of caves, known as speleogenesis, can occur over the course of millions of years. Caves can vary considerably in size, and are formed by various geological processes. These may involve a combination of chemical processes, erosion by water, tectonic forces, microorganisms, pressure, and atmospheric influences.

Most caves are formed in limestone by dissolution. Caves can be classified in various ways, including a contrast between active and relict, where active caves have water flowing through them and relict caves do not, though water may be retained in them. Types of active caves include inflow caves ("into which a stream sinks"), outflow caves ("from which a stream emerges"), and through caves ("traversed by a stream"). In speleology, a cavern is an enlarged space within a cave—but in cave diving different terms are commonly used (such as 'chamber' or 'room'), as 'cavern' implies visual proximity to an exit.

=== Cave ===
The underwater cave environment includes those parts of caves which may be explored underwater. Recreational cave diving can be defined as diving underground beyond the reach of natural daylight, as a way of distinguishing between cave and cavern diving. In this context, while artificially formed underground spaces such as mines are not generally called caves by divers, the activity of diving in them is often classed as cave diving for training and certification purposes by diver training agencies.

=== Cavern ===
Cavern diving is an arbitrarily defined, limited scope activity of diving in the naturally illuminated part of underwater caves, where the risk of getting lost is small, as the exit can be seen, and the equipment needed is reduced due to the limited distance to surface air. It is defined as a recreational diving activity as opposed to a technical diving activity on the grounds of low risk and basic equipment requirements.

== Procedures ==
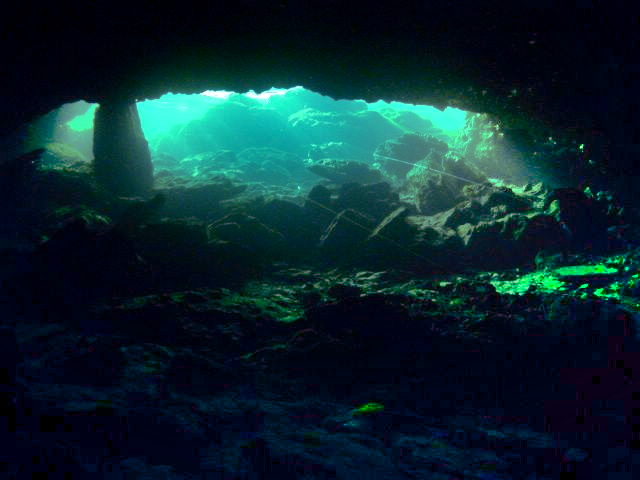
Entrance to Peacock Springs Cave System

The procedures of cave-diving have much in common with procedures used for other types of penetration diving. They differ from open-water diving procedures mainly in the emphasis on navigation, gas management, operating in confined spaces, and that the diver is physically constrained from direct ascent to the surface during much of the dive.

As most cave-diving is done in an environment where there is no free surface with breathable air allowing an above-water exit, it is critically important to be able to find the way out before the breathing gas runs out. This is ensured by the use of a continuous guideline between the dive team and a point outside of the flooded part of the cave, and diligent planning and monitoring of gas supplies. Two basic types of guideline are used: permanent lines, and temporary lines. Permanent lines may include a main line starting near the entrance/exit, and side lines or branch lines, and are marked to indicate the direction along the line to the nearest exit. Temporary lines include exploration lines and jump lines.

Decompression procedures may take into account that the cave diver usually follows a very rigidly constrained and precisely defined route, both into and out of the cave, and can reasonably expect to find any equipment such as drop cylinders temporarily stored along the guideline while making the exit. In some caves, changes of depth of the cave along the dive route will constrain decompression depths, and gas mixtures and decompression schedules can be tailored to take this into account.

== Skills ==
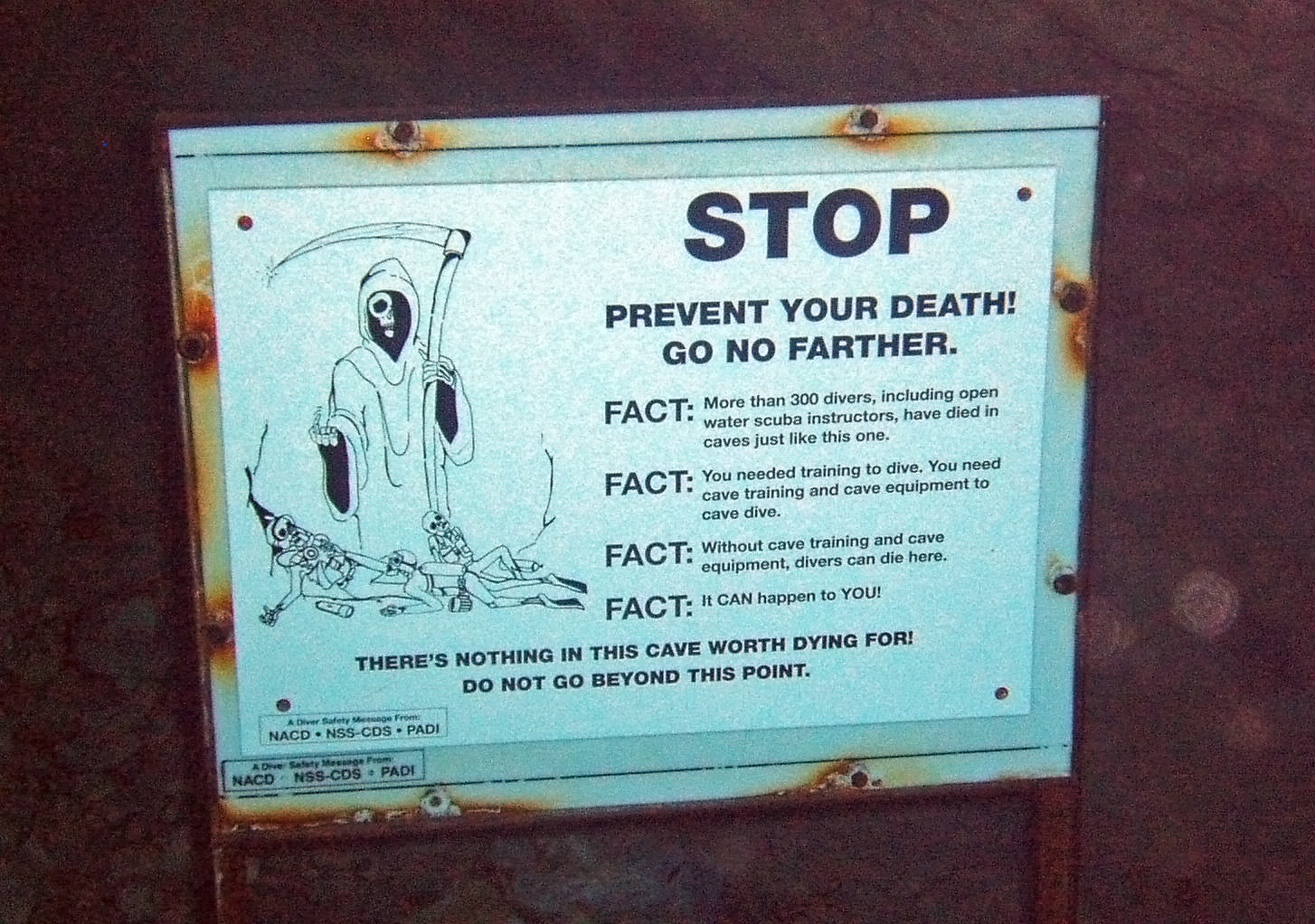
Warning sign near the entrance to a cave

Most open-water diving skills apply to cave-diving, and there are additional skills specific to the environment, and to the chosen equipment configuration.

- Good buoyancy control, trim and finning technique help preserve visibility in areas with silt deposits. The ability to reverse kick to back out of restrictions where there is no space to turn around is useful.
  - Finning skills: Frog kick, which avoids up- and downward directed vortices and are less likely to disturb silt on the bottom or loose material on the ceiling, and modified frog kick, a version which is more suited to narrow spaces; modified flutter kick, a version of flutter kick which minimises downward directed vortices; back kick, which produces thrust towards the feet, used to move backwards along the long axis of the diver, and helicopter turns, which rotate the diver on the spot around a vertical axis, using lower leg and ankle movements.
- The ability to navigate in total darkness using the guideline to find the way out is a safety critical emergency skill. Line management skills required for cave-diving include laying and recovering guide lines using a reel, tie-offs, the use of a jump line to cross gaps or find a lost guide line in silted out conditions, identifying the direction along the guideline leading to the exit, and the skills of dealing with a break in a guideline.
- Emergency skills for dealing with gas supply problems are complicated by the possibility of the emergency occurring in a confined space and low visibility or darkness, and at a considerable horizontal distance from a free surface to the atmosphere.
- Communicating by touch and light signals.
- Providing and receiving emergency breathing gas while swimming through narrow spaces.

=== Line management ===
The essential cave-diving procedure is navigation using a guide line. This includes laying and marking line, following line and interpreting line markers, avoiding entanglement, recovering from entanglement, maintaining and repairing line, finding lost line, jumping gaps, and recovering line, any of which may need to be done in zero visibility, total darkness, tight confined spaces or a combination of these conditions.

- Laying a cave line: the procedure of running line (unreeling line under light tension as one advances) to avoid snagging on the diver and so that it runs fairly straight between placements, placing the line so it can all be seen and reached, so it can be followed in good or bad visibility, avoiding line traps, and securing the line sufficiently at suitable places to keep it in position.
  - Making placements - securing the guideline as it is being run and the choice of primary and secondary tie offs.
  - Temporary line – line that is laid on the way into parts of a cave without permanent line, and recovered to the reel on the way out.
  - Permanent line – line that is thicker, and therefore easier to see, stronger, and more abrasion resistant, and more securely fastened, intended to be left in place for use by other divers. It may be secured to placements at closer intervals to facilitate finding the other end and reconnection in case of a break. It is not recovered during exit, and will generally be marked.
    - Gold line is heavy duty permanent guide line of a bright yellow colour and kernmantle construction that leads to the exit. The colour was chosen to make the line more easily identifiable while remaining highly visible, and a heavier duty line also helps in identification by feel and makes the line more durable. In some regions the consensus among cave diving professionals is to reserve gold line for cavern areas which are used for tours. In some cases the gold line extends to the naturally illuminated zone, while in others it will start inside the dark zone, to avoid tempting incompetent and inadequately equipped divers from following the line into the cave.
- Marking line: Permanent line is marked to indicate the direction to the nearest exit, and to indicate where dive teams have passed but have not yet returned by looping the line onto a line marker, ensuring that a directional marker points in the correct direction, and that all markers are sufficiently securely attached, while remaining easily removable if temporary.
  - Directional markers - cave arrows used to indicate the way out along the line.
  - Personal markers – cookies – temporary markers to indicate that a diver has passed beyond a point but has not returned yet, particularly where the group leaves the permanent line or makes a jump to a secondary permanent (branch) line. A personal directional marker may be attached to a line to indicate that the owner has gone in that direction, which can happen after divers are separated if one finds the line but not the other divers, and decides to exit independently.
- Following a line – the skills of navigating back out of a cave using the line as a guide, particularly in the dark and low visibility.
- Finding a lost line: although cave-diving procedures are intended to minimize the risk of losing the guide line, it can happen, and as the chance of finding one's way out without the line are drastically reduced, losing the line is considered a life-threatening situation, and the diver must be competent in the methods for relocating the line in all reasonably foreseeable circumstances, which include a bad silt-out, total darkness, and loss of contact with the other divers in the team. Methods of search should prevent the diver from drifting away from the vicinity of the line, so the start position for the search should be secured by tying off a search line. In principle, if the diver feels their way around the cross section of the cave orthogonal to the line direction until they get back to the starting point, the guideline should be either found directly, or be within the loop of the search line, but even this is not guaranteed to work, as the shape of the cave and limited breathing gas supplies could make this impossible.
- Fixing a line break, This requires the ability to tie reliable knots, which may have to be done in bad visibility. It also requires the diver to find the other end of the break. On the way into a cave a line break is an inconvenience, as if the other side cannot be found, the divers can still find their way out. On the way out a line break is a life-threatening emergency until the other end is found, as gas supply is limited and there is no infallible way to find the other end while there is enough gas to complete the exit.
- Jumping a gap to a branch line – this involves tying off to the permanent line in a way that is unlikely to come loose, but may be released quickly on the return. Passing a loop on the end of the jump line round the permanent line and over the reel is a standard method. A tag on the end of the loop helps release it quickly. This method cannot be inadvertently released by other divers following the main line.
- Recovering temporary line – this is done by the last diver in line on the way out, so the others can follow the line out of the cave, even in reduced visibility, without risking losing the line. They may prepare the line for the reel operator, by releasing tie-offs, which cuts down on delays. In an emergency exit the reel and line may be temporarily abandoned, as it can be retrieved later. The reel operator keeps a light tension on the line and tries to keep it evenly distributed over the width of the reel while winding in. The divers further ahead on the line can feel the presence of others behind them by line tension and small movements of the line as it is reeled in.

=== Lost line ===
Losing the guide line in a cave is a potentially life-threatening emergency. While following recommended best practice makes it highly unlikely that a diver will lose the line, it can and does happen, and there are procedures which will usually work to find it again. Any reliable information on where the diver is likely to be relative to the last known position of the line may be critical, and the procedure of choice will depend on what is reliably known. In all situations, the diver will attempt to stabilise the situation and avoid getting further lost, and make a thorough visual check in all directions from where they are at the time, taking into account the possibility of the line being in a line trap. If the diver has not also separated from their buddy, the buddy may know where the line is, and can be asked, and if the diver is separated from their buddy, the buddy may be at the line, and the buddy's light may be visible.

Stabilising the position is generally done by finding the nearest feasible tie-off point and securely tying off a search line. The direction of the guide line when last seen should be known, and therefore the direction the diver was swimming in before losing the line. If the diver was neutrally buoyant while following the line, the approximate depth can be reconstructed by finding the depth of neutral buoyancy again, without adjusting inflation of BCD or dry suit. Unless the line was lost by the diver not noticing a change of direction, it is likely to be at much the same depth, in much the same direction, and at a similar lateral and vertical distance as when last seen, making it logical to try that direction first. While swimming towards the estimated position of the line and slowly paying out search line, the diver will search visually, and in low visibility or darkness, also by feel, making arm sweeps across the expected direction of the line, while defending the head from impact with the other arm. The distance swum towards the estimated position of the lost line can be measured by the spacing and number of knots paid out on the search line. If the search fails, the diver will return to the tie off and try again in the next best guess for the direction the line may be. The diver may also choose to try a different search method. The best search method for any given situation will depend on the water conditions, the layout of the section of cave, the way the line was laid, the situational knowledge and skills of the diver, and the equipment available – a method that would be ideal for one situation might not work at all for another.

If the line is found, but not the other divers, the diver can tie off their search reel to the guide line as an indicator to other members of the team that they were lost but have found the guide line, and indicate the direction that they intend to proceed along the guideline with a personal directional marker so that others who see it while searching for the lost diver will know whether the diver chose the right direction to exit the cave.

=== Lost buddy ===
This is generally the converse situation to the lost guide line, in that the diver loses contact with their buddy or team but remains in contact with the guide line, so is not themselves lost. Their first priority is to not get lost or disorientated, and in furtherance of this aim would attach a directional line marker to the guide line indicating the direction to the exit before starting a search. The search line can be tied to the directional marker to prevent it from sliding along the line during the search. The direction for the search would depend on the layout of that part of the cave, and where the missing diver should have been in the group. The search party must consider their own safety first, regarding how much gas they can afford to use in a search, which will depend on the stage of the dive when the diver is noticed to be missing. When searching in darkness, the searchers should periodically turn off their lights as this will allow them to see the lost diver's light more easily.

=== Gas planning and management ===
Gas planning is the aspect of dive planning which deals with the calculation or estimation of the amounts and mixtures of gases to be used for a planned dive profile. It usually assumes that the dive profile, including decompression, is known, but the process may be iterative, involving changes to the dive profile as a consequence of the gas requirement calculation, or changes to the gas mixtures chosen. Use of calculated reserves based on planned dive profile and estimated gas consumption rates rather than an arbitrary pressure based on a fraction of the initial gas supply is sometimes referred to as rock bottom gas management. The purpose of gas planning is to ensure that for all reasonably foreseeable contingencies, the divers of a team have sufficient breathing gas to safely return to a place where more breathing gas is available. In almost all cases this will be the surface.

Gas planning includes the following aspects:

- Choice of breathing gases to suit the depth at which they will be used,
- Choice of scuba configuration, to conveniently carry the gas, or store it at stage points along the route
- Estimation of gas quantities required for the planned dive, including bottom gas, travel gas, and decompression gases, as appropriate to the profile.
- Estimation of gas quantities for reasonably foreseeable contingencies. Under stress it is likely that a diver will increase breathing rate and decrease swimming speed. Both of these lead to a higher gas consumption during an emergency exit or ascent.
- Choice of cylinders to carry the required gases. Each cylinder volume and working pressure must be sufficient to contain the required quantity of gas.
- Calculation of the pressures for each of the gases in each of the cylinders to provide the required quantities.
- Specifying the critical pressures of relevant gas mixtures for appropriate stages (waypoints) of the planned dive profile (gas matching).

The primary breathing apparatus may be open circuit scuba or rebreather, and bailout may also be open circuit or rebreather. Emergency gas may be shared among the team members, or each diver may carry their own, but in all cases each diver must be able to bail out onto a gas supply of their own for long enough to get to the next planned source of emergency gas. If for any reason this situation no longer applies, there is a single point of critical failure, and the risk becomes unacceptable, so the dive should be turned.

Gas management also includes the blending, filling, analysing, marking, storage, and transportation of gas cylinders for a dive, and the monitoring and switching of breathing gases during a dive, and the provision of emergency gas to another member of the dive team. The primary aim is to ensure that everyone has enough to breathe of a gas suitable for the current depth at all times, and is aware of the gas mixture in use and its effect on decompression obligations and oxygen toxicity risk.

==== Gas management rules of thumb ====
The rule of thirds for gas management is a rule of thumb used by divers to plan dives so they have enough breathing gas remaining in their diving cylinder at the end of the dive to be able to complete the dive safely. This rule mostly applies to diving in overhead environments, such as caves and wrecks, where a direct ascent to the surface is impossible and the divers must return the way they came.

For divers following the rule, one third of the gas supply is planned for the outward journey, one third is for the return journey and one third is a safety reserve. However, when diving with a buddy with a higher breathing rate or a different volume of gas, it may be necessary to set one third of the buddy's gas supply as the remaining 'third'. This means that the turn point to exit is earlier, or that the diver with the lower breathing rate carries a larger volume of gas than he alone requires.

A different option for penetration dives is the Half + 15 bar (half + 200 psi) method, in which the contingency gas for the stage is carried in the primary cylinders. Some divers consider this method to be the most conservative when multi-staging. If all goes to plan when using this method, the divers surface with stages nearly empty, but with all the contingency gas still in their primary cylinders. With a single stage drop, this means the primary cylinders will still be about half-full.

=== Special cases ===
- High flow sinks. Gas planning is more complicated when the flow in the cave opposes the diver on the exit, as it is then not reasonable to assume that the amount of gas needed for the exit is equal to the amount used for the entry, and the rule of thirds does not apply. A significantly larger reserve will be needed, and the turn pressure will be higher.
- Complex traverses
- Complex circuits

== Training ==
Cave-diving training includes equipment selection and configuration, guideline protocols and techniques, gas management protocols, communication techniques, propulsion techniques, emergency management protocols, and psychological education. Cave diver training also stresses the importance of risk management and cave conservation ethics. Most training systems offer progressive stages of education and certification.

- Cavern training covers the basic skills needed to enter the overhead environment. Training will generally consist of gas planning, propulsion techniques needed to deal with the silty environments in many caves, reel and handling, and communication. Once certified as a cavern diver, a diver may undertake cavern diving with a cavern or cave certified "buddy", as well as continue into cave-diving training.
- Introduction into cave training builds on the techniques learned during cavern training and includes the training needed to penetrate beyond the cavern zone and working with permanent guidelines that exist in many caves. Once intro to cave certified, a diver may penetrate much further into a cave, usually limited by 1/3 of a single cylinder, or in the case of a basic cave certification, 1/6 of double cylinders. An intro cave diver is usually not certified to do complex navigation.
- Apprentice cave training serves as the transition from intro to full certification and includes the training needed to penetrate deep into caves working from permanent guide lines as well as limited exposure to side lines that exist in many caves. Training covers complex dive planning and decompression procedures used for longer dives. Once apprentice certified, a diver may penetrate much further into a cave, usually limited by 1/3 of double cylinders. An apprentice diver is also allowed to do a single jump or gap (a break in the guideline from two sections of mainline or between mainline and sideline) during the dive. An apprentice diver typically has one year to finish full cave or must repeat the apprentice stage.
- Full cave training serves as the final level of basic training and includes the training needed to penetrate deep into the cave working from both permanent guidelines and sidelines, and may plan and complete complex dives deep into a system using decompression to stay longer. Once cave certified, a diver may penetrate much further into a cave, usually limited by 1/3 of double cylinders. A cave diver is also certified as competent to do multiple jumps or gaps (a break in the guideline from two sections of mainline or between mainline and sideline) during the dive.
- Further training may be available in skills for cave surveying and mapping.

=== Certification ===
Various diver training and certification organizations offer training for cave divers, often based on the three cave zones defined by CMAS. Some organizations offer cavern diving training for recreational divers, (Zone 1). Cave diving involves significant risks, so a self-taught approach is discouraged.

The following training courses are offered by the listed organisations:

Zone	CMAS	GUE	ANDI	NACD	NAUI	NSS-CDS	PADI	TDI
Cavern diver (Zone 1)	Cave diver I		Cavern Diver, Level 2	Cavern Diver	Cavern Diver	Cavern Diver	Cavern Diver	Cavern Diver
Cave diver (Zone 2)	Cave diver II	Cave Diver Level 1	Cave Diver, Level 1	Intro to Cave Diving	Cave Diver Level I	Basic/Intro Cave Diver		Intro to Cave
		Cave Diver Level 2		Apprentice to Cave		Apprentice Cave Diver		
Cave diver (Zone 3)	Cave diver III	Cave Diver Level 2	Cave Diver, Level 3 and Cave Explorer, Level 4	Full Cave Diver	Cave Diver Level II	Cave Diver		Full Cave
Cave diver (58 m)		Cave 2 + TEK 1	Cave Explorer Level 5					
Cave diver guide					Cave Guide (Technical Support Leader)			
Cave diving instructor 1	Cave diving instructor I	Cave Instructor Level 1	Assistant Instructor (ASI)	Cavern Instructor	Assistant Instructor	Instructor	Specialty Instructor	
Cave diving instructor 2	Cave diving Instructor II	Cave Instructor Level 2	Open Water Instructor (OWI)	Cave Instructor	Instructor	Instructor		
Cave diving instructor 3	Cave diving instructor III	Cave Instructor Level 3						

In France, courses organized by the national cave diving commission of the FFESSM, are offered to holders of level 2 certification or higher. The French Cave Diving School of the FFS also offers courses open to any autonomous diver.

== Exploration, surveys and mapping ==
A significant aspect of cave diving by competent and enthusiastic cave divers is exploration, survey and mapping. Data collected is often shared and may be stored on databases to help optimise the effectiveness of such surveys, and make the information generally available.

Underwater cave mapping is complicated by both a lack of access to the surface for GPS positions, darkness, with short line-of-sight, and limited visibility, which complicate optical measurement. Altitude/depth is relatively simple as accurate depth measurement is available to divers in the form of decompression computers, which log a depth/time record of reasonable accuracy and are available for instantaneous readout at any point, and depth can be referenced to the altitude at the surface. Vertical dimensions can be directly measured or calculated as differences in depth.

Surface coordinates can be collected via GPS and remote sensing, with varying degrees of precision and accuracy depending on the type of entrance. In some caves the water surface is in view of GPS satellites, in others it is a considerable distance along a complex route from the nearest open air. Three dimensional models of varying accuracy and detail can be created by processing measurements collected by whatever methods were available. These can be used in virtual reality models. The usual methods for survey and mapping of underwater caves are dead reckoning and direct measurements of distance, compass direction and depth, by diving teams of two or three scuba divers, who record azimuth of the cave line, measurements of height, width, depth, and slope at intervals along the line, generally using a permanent guide line as a reference baseline, and take photographic records of features and objects of interest. Data are collected on wet-notes and by digital photography. Hand-held sonar may be used for distance measurement where available. Where the depth or other constraints prevent divers from exploring in person, tethered and untethered remotely operated underwater vehicles (ROUVs) have been used effectively, using sonar technology to scan and map the surroundings, and video to record the appearance.

Features, artifacts, remains, and other objects of interest are recorded in situ as effectively as possible, generally by photography.

== Hazards ==
Cave-diving is one of the most challenging and potentially dangerous kinds of diving and presents many hazards. Cave-diving is a form of penetration diving, meaning that in an emergency a diver cannot swim vertically to the surface due to the cave's ceilings, and so must swim the entire way back out. The underwater navigation through the cave system may be difficult and exit routes may be at a considerable distance, requiring the diver to have sufficient breathing gas to make the journey. The dive may also be deep, resulting in potential deep diving risks.

Visibility can vary from nearly unlimited to low, or non-existent, and can go from very good to very bad in a single dive. While a less-intensive kind of diving called cavern diving does not take divers beyond the reach of natural light (and typically no deeper than 30 metres (100 feet)), and penetration not further than 60 m (200 ft), true cave-diving can involve penetrations of many thousands of feet, well beyond the reach of sunlight. The level of darkness experienced creates an environment impossible to see in without an artificial source of light even if the water is clear. Caves often contain sand, mud, clay, silt, or other sediment that can further reduce underwater visibility in seconds when stirred up. Consequently, visibility is often worse during exit, and divers rely on the guideline for finding the way out.

The water in caves can have strong flow. Most caves flooded to the surface at the cave mouth are either springs or siphons. Springs have out-flowing currents, where water is coming up out of the Earth and flowing out across the land's surface. Siphons have in-flowing currents where, for example, an above-ground river is going underground. Some caves are complex and have some tunnels with out-flowing currents, and other tunnels with in-flowing currents. Inflowing currents can cause serious problems for the diver, as they make the exit more difficult, and the diver is carried to spaces that are unfamiliar and may be dangerous, while outflowing currents generally make the exit quicker and the diver is carried through places they have been before and can be prepared for difficult areas.

Cave-diving has been perceived as one of the more deadly sports in the world. This perception may be exaggerated because the majority of divers who have died in caves have either not undergone specialized training or have had inadequate equipment for the environment. Some cave divers have suggested that cave-diving is statistically much safer than recreational diving due to the much larger barriers imposed by experience, training, and equipment cost, but there is no definitive statistical evidence for this claim.

There is no reliable worldwide database listing all cave-diving fatalities. Such fractional statistics as are available, however, suggest that few divers have died while following accepted protocols and while using equipment configurations recognized as acceptable by the cave-diving community. In the very rare cases of exceptions to this rule there have typically been unusual circumstances.

== Safety ==
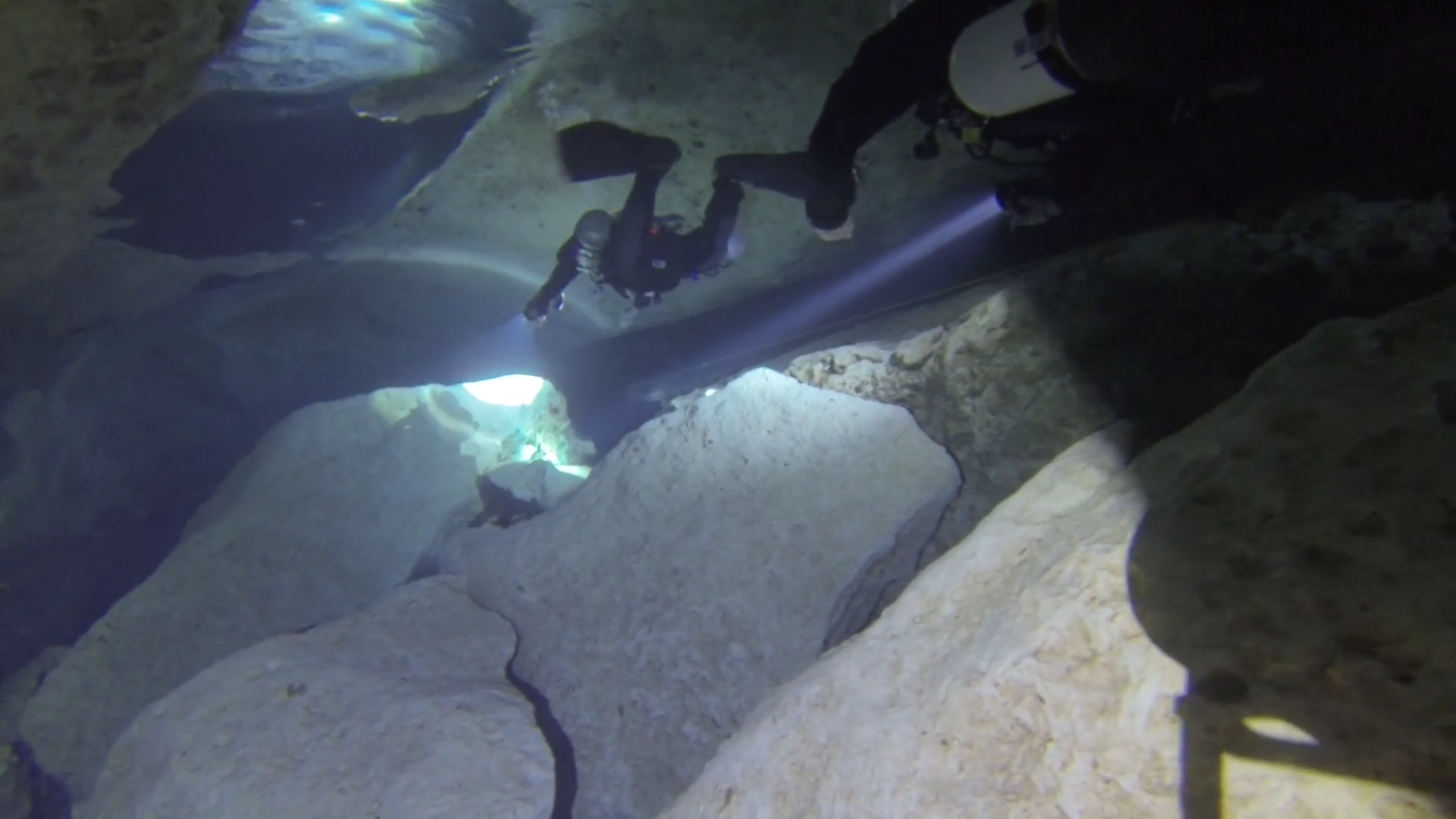
Cave divers wearing sidemount cylinders following a main line

Most cave divers recognize five general rules or contributing factors for safe cave-diving, which were popularized, adapted and became generally accepted from Sheck Exley's 1979 publication Basic Cave Diving: A Blueprint for Survival. In this book, Exley included accounts of actual cave-diving accidents, and followed each one with a breakdown of what factors contributed to the accident. Despite the unique circumstances of each individual accident, Exley found that at least one of a small number of major factors contributed to each one. This technique for breaking down accident reports and finding common causes among them is now called accident analysis, and is taught in introductory cave-diving courses. Exley outlined a number of these resulting cave-diving rules, but today these five are the most recognized:

- Training: A safety conscious cave diver does not intentionally exceed the scope of their training. Cave-diving is normally taught in stages, each successive stage focusing on more complex aspects of cave-diving. Each stage of training is intended to be reinforced with actual cave-diving experience to develop competence before starting training at a more complex level. Accident analysis of cave-diving fatalities has shown that academic training without sufficient real world experience is not always enough in the event of an underwater emergency. By systematically building experience the diver can develop the confidence, motor skills and reflexes to remain calm and apply the appropriate procedures in an emergency. An inexperienced diver is more likely to panic than an experienced diver when confronted with a similar situation, all other factors being equal. Experience in dealing successfully with real or simulated problems is of the greatest value, experience of dives where nothing goes wrong reinforces the skills used, but not the skills that were not needed but might be critical in an emergency. When trained to the highest available level, further competence can be developed by practice and gradual extension of range of experience.
- Guide line: A continuous guide line is maintained at all times between the leader of a dive team and a fixed point selected outside the cave entrance in open water. Often this line is tied off a second time as a backup directly inside the cavern zone. As the dive leader lays the guideline they take great care to ensure there is appropriate tension on the line, and that it does not go into line traps, tying off the line as necessary to keep it leading through a clear route. Other team members remain between the lead diver and the exit, in easy reach of the line at all times. If a silt out occurs, divers can find the line and follow it back to the cave entrance. Failure to use a continuous guide line to open water is cited as the most frequent cause of fatality among untrained, non-certified divers who venture into caves. Greater care to avoid line traps is required for laying permanent line, and more frequent tie-offs would be expected, as a permanent line is more susceptible to breaking over time.
- Depth rules: Gas consumption, nitrogen narcosis and decompression obligation increase with depth, and the effects of nitrogen narcosis may be more critical in a cave due to the high task loading and presence of combinations of hazards. Cave divers are advised not to dive to depths exceeding the planned depth and the applicable range of their equipment and the breathing gases in use, and to keep in mind this effective difference between open water depth and cave depth. Excessive depth is frequently cited as a contributory factor in fatal incidents involving fully trained cave divers.
- Breathing gas management: The breathing gas supply must last the diver until out of the overhead environment. There are several strategies for gas management. The most common protocol is the 'rule of thirds,' in which one third of the initial gas supply is used for ingress, one third for egress, and one third to support another team member in the case of an emergency. This is a very simple method, but is not always sufficient. UK practice is to adhere to the rule of thirds, but with an added emphasis on keeping depletion of the separate air systems "balanced", so that the complete loss of any single gas supply will still leave the diver with sufficient gas to return safely. The rule of thirds makes no allowance for increased air consumption that the stress caused by the loss of an air system may induce. Dissimilar tank sizes among the divers are also not allowed for by the rule of thirds, and a sufficient reserve should be calculated for each dive. UK practice is to assume that each diver is completely independent, as in a typical UK sump there is usually nothing that a buddy can do to assist a diver in trouble. Most UK cave divers dive solo. US sump divers follow a similar protocol. The rule of thirds was devised as an approach to diving Florida's caves – they typically have high outflow currents, which help to reduce air consumption when exiting. In a cave system with little or no outflow it is prudent to reserve more air than is provided by the rule of thirds.
- Lights: Each cave diver should have at least three independent sources of light. One is considered the primary and is intended for general use during the dive. The others are considered backup lights and may be lower powered as they are not intended for exploration. Each light must have an expected burn time of at least the planned duration of the dive. If any diver loses light function so that they have fewer than three working lights, protocol requires that the dive be aborted for all members of the dive team and that they immediately start the exit.

Most cave-diving fatalities are due to running out of gas before reaching the exit. This is often the direct consequence of getting lost, whether the guide line is found again or not, and whether the visibility deteriorates, lights fail, or someone panics. On rare occasions equipment failure is unrecoverable, or a diver becomes inextricably trapped, seriously injured, incapacitated by using an unsuitable gas for the depth, or swept away by strong flow. Getting lost means separation from the continuous guide line to the exit, and not knowing the direction to the exit.

Some cave divers are taught to remember the five key components with the mnemonic: "The Good Divers Always Live" (training, guide, depth, air, light).

In recent years new contributing factors were considered after reviewing accidents involving solo diving, diving with incapable dive partners, video or photography in caves, complex cave dives and cave-diving in large groups. With the establishment of technical diving, the use of mixed gases—such as trimix for bottom gas, and nitrox and oxygen for decompression—reduces the margin for error. Accident analysis suggests that breathing the wrong gas for the depth or not analyzing the breathing gas properly has also led to cave-diving accidents.

Cave-diving requires a variety of specialized procedures, and divers who do not correctly apply these procedures may significantly increase the risk to the members of their team. The cave-diving community works hard to educate the public on the risks they assume when they enter water-filled caves. Warning signs with the likenesses of the Grim Reaper have been placed just inside the openings of many popular caves in the US and Mexico, and others have been placed in nearby parking lots and local dive shops.

Many cave-diving sites around the world include open-water basins, which are popular open-water diving sites. The management of these sites try to minimize the risk of untrained divers being tempted to venture inside the cave systems. With the support of the cave-diving community, many of these sites enforce a "no-lights rule" for divers who lack cave training—they may not carry any lights into the water with them. It is easy to venture into an underwater cave with a light and not realize how far away from the entrance (and daylight) one has swum; this rule is based on the theory that, without a light, divers will not venture beyond daylight.

In the early phases of cave-diving the analysis shows that 90% of accidents were not trained cave divers; from the 2000s on the trend has reversed to 80% of accidents involving trained cave divers. Modern cave divers' capability and available technology allows divers to venture well beyond traditional training limits and into actual exploration. The result is an increase of cave-diving accidents, in 2011 the yearly average of 2.5 fatalities a year tripled. In 2012 fatalities reached the highest annual rate to that date at over 20.

As response to the increase in fatalities during the years 2010 onwards, the International Diving Research and Exploration Organization (IDREO) was created in order to "bring awareness of the current safety situation of Cave Diving" by listing current worldwide accidents by year and promoting a community discussion and analysis of accidents through a "Cave Diver Safety Meeting" held annually.

== Equipment ==
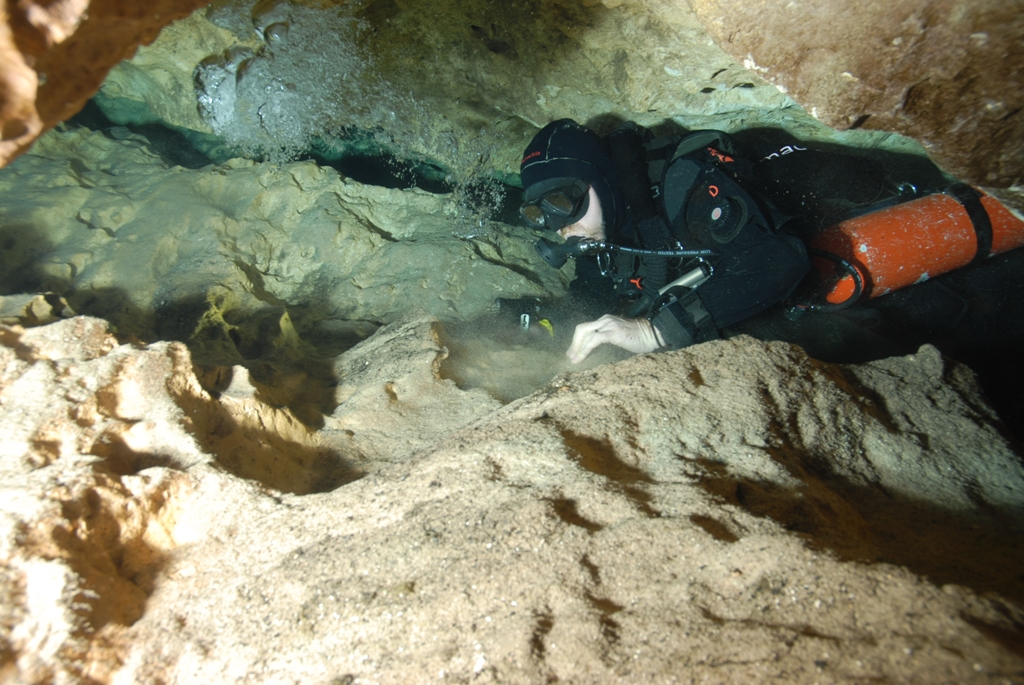
Sidemount diver in a fairly tight space

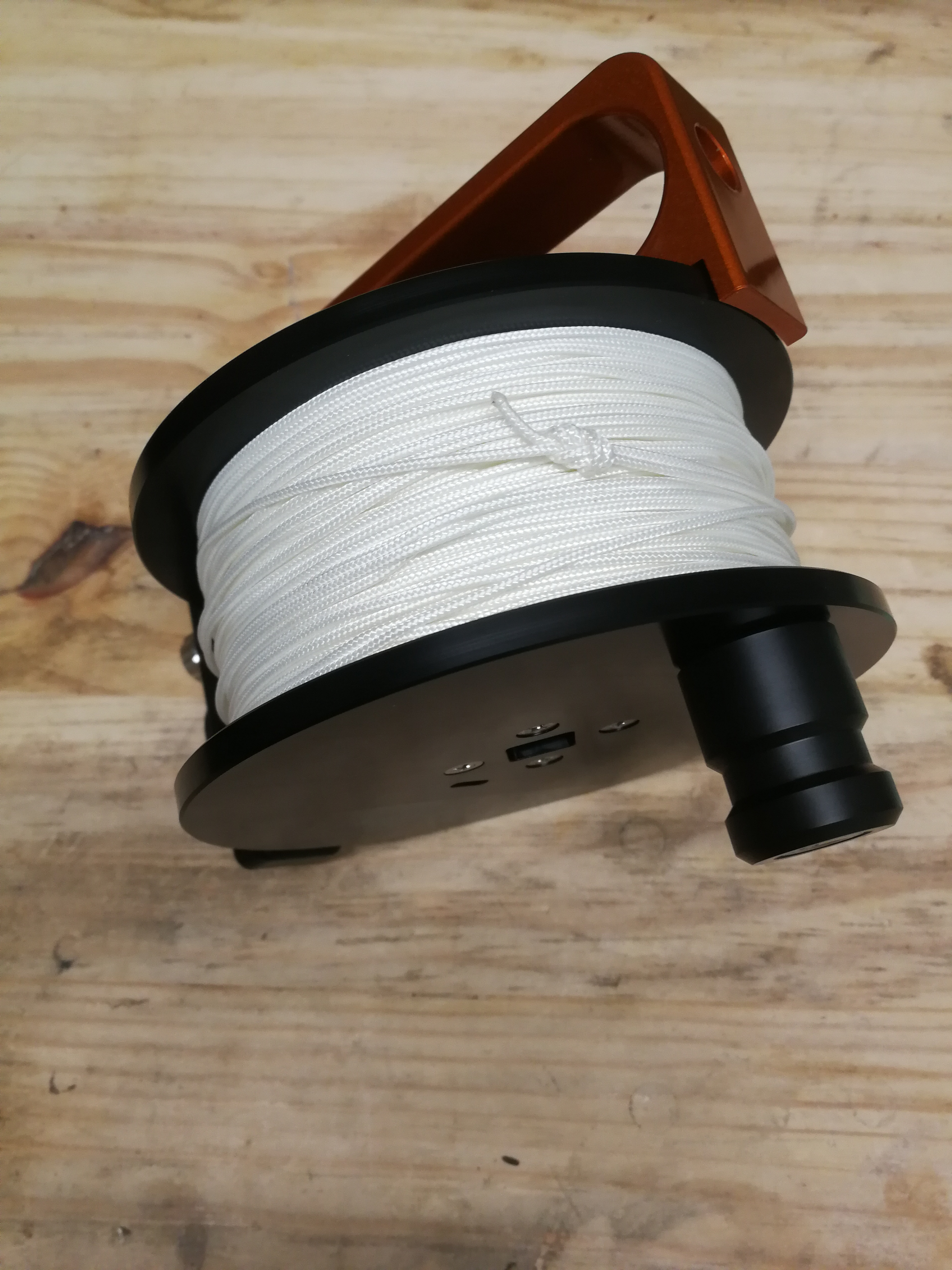
Cave diving guideline reel

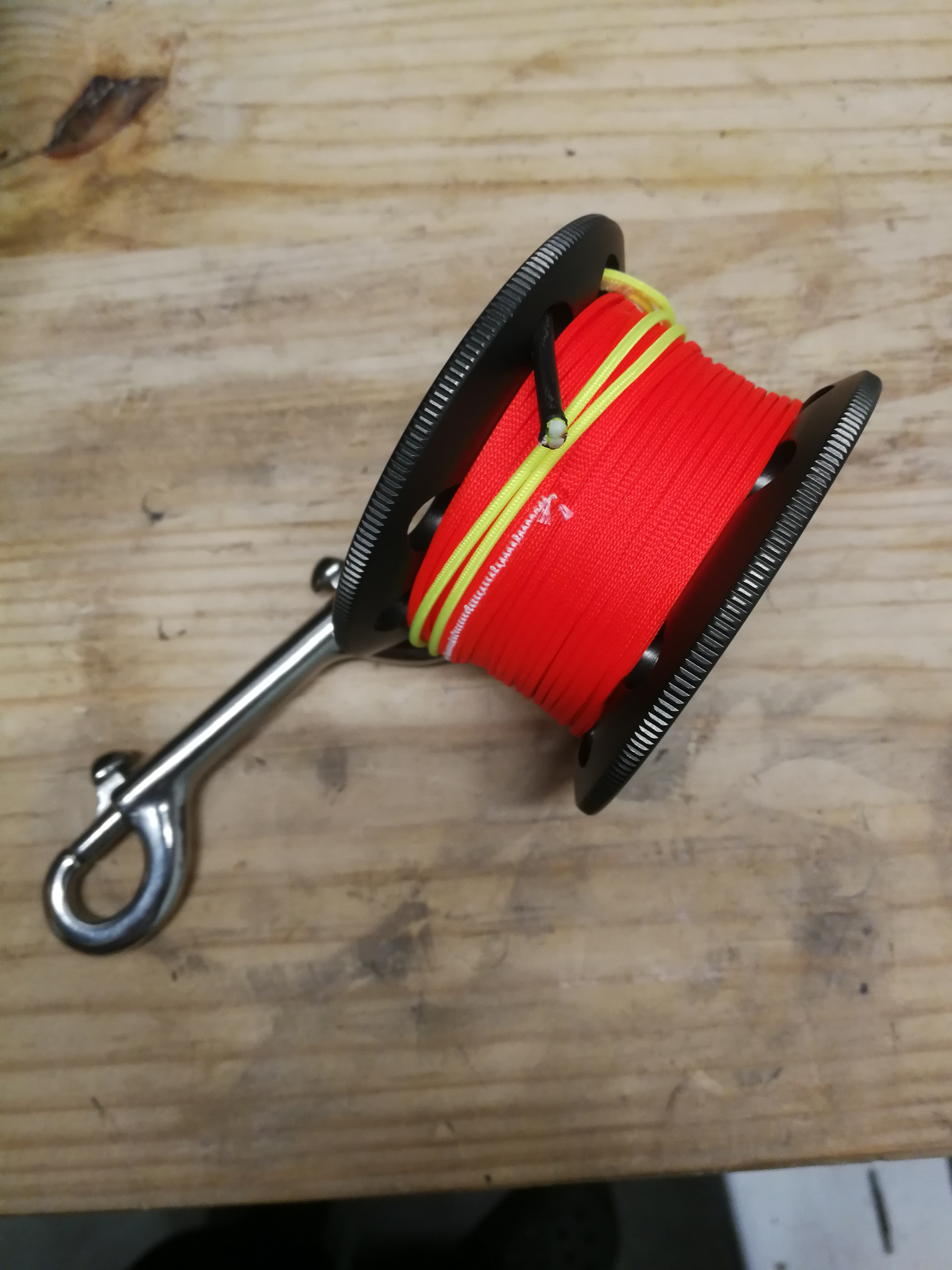
Cave line spool with double end bolt snap

Equipment used by cave divers ranges from fairly standard recreational scuba configurations, to more complex arrangements which allow more freedom of movement in confined spaces, extended range in terms of depth and time, allowing greater distances to be covered in acceptable safety, and equipment which helps with navigation, in what are usually dark, and often silty and convoluted spaces.

Scuba configurations which are more often found in cave-diving than in open water diving include independent or manifolded twin cylinder rigs, side-mount harnesses, sling cylinders, rebreathers and backplate and wing harnesses. Bill Stone designed and used epoxy composite tanks for exploration of the San Agustín and Sistema Huautla caves in Mexico to decrease the weight for dry sections and vertical passages.

Stage cylinders are cylinders which are used to provide gas for a portion of the penetration. They may be deposited on the bottom at the guideline on preparation dives, to be picked up for use during the main dive, or may be carried by the divers and dropped off at the line during the penetration to be retrieved on the way out.

One of the high risk hazards of cave-diving is getting lost in the cave. The use of guide lines is the standard mitigation for this risk. Guide lines may be permanent or laid and recovered during the dive, using cave reels to deploy and recover the line. Permanent branch lines may be laid with a gap between the start of the branch line and the nearest point on the main line. Line used for this purpose is known as cave line. Gap spools with a relatively short line are commonly used to make the jump.

Line arrows are used to point towards the nearest exit, and cookies are used to indicate use of a line by a team of divers.

Silt screws are short lengths of rigid tube (usually plastic) with one sharpened end and a notch or slot at the other end to secure the line, which are pushed into the silt or detritus of the cave floor as a place to tie off a guideline when no suitable natural tie-off points are available.

A simple plastic helmet, such as those used in water sports like whitewater kayaking, is good protection in case of accidental contact with the cave ceiling or stalactites.

Diver propulsion vehicles, or scooters, are sometimes used to extend the range by reducing the work load on the diver and allowing faster travel in open sections of cave. Reliability of the diver propulsion vehicle is very important, as a failure could compromise the ability of the diver to exit the cave before running out of gas. Where this is a significant risk, divers may tow a spare scooter.

Dive lights are critical safety equipment, as it is dark inside caves. Each diver generally carries a primary light, and at least one backup light. A minimum of three lights is recommended. The primary light should last the planned duration of the dive, as should each of the backup lights.

== History ==
One of the earliest known cave dives was a freedive in 1922 by Norbert Casteret in the Montespan cave, France.

Jacques-Yves Cousteau, co-inventor of the first commercially successful open circuit scuba equipment, was the world's first open circuit scuba cave diver. However, many cave divers penetrated caves prior to the advent of scuba with surface supplied breathing apparatus through the use of air hoses and compressors. Scuba diving in all its forms, including cave-diving, has advanced in earnest since Cousteau introduced the Aqua-Lung in 1943.

Two regions have had particular influence on cave-diving techniques and equipment due to their very different cave-diving environments. These are the United Kingdom, and the United States, mainly Florida.

=== Records ===
On October 16, 2026, Bartłomiej Pitala broke the world cave diving depth record by reaching a depth of 338 metres (1,109 ft) in the Matka Vrelo underwater cave system, located in Matka Canyon, near Skopje, North Macedonia. The achievement surpassed the previous record of 312 metres (1,024 ft), set by Xavier Méniscus on January 6, 2024, at the Font Estramar chasm in Salses-le-Château, France. Before that, the record of 308 metres (1,010 ft) was held by Frédéric Swierczynski, while Méniscus had previously reached 286 metres (938 ft) at Font Estramar on December 30, 2019. Earlier, Nuno Gomes had descended to 282 metres (925 ft) at Boesmansgat in South Africa.

=== UK history ===
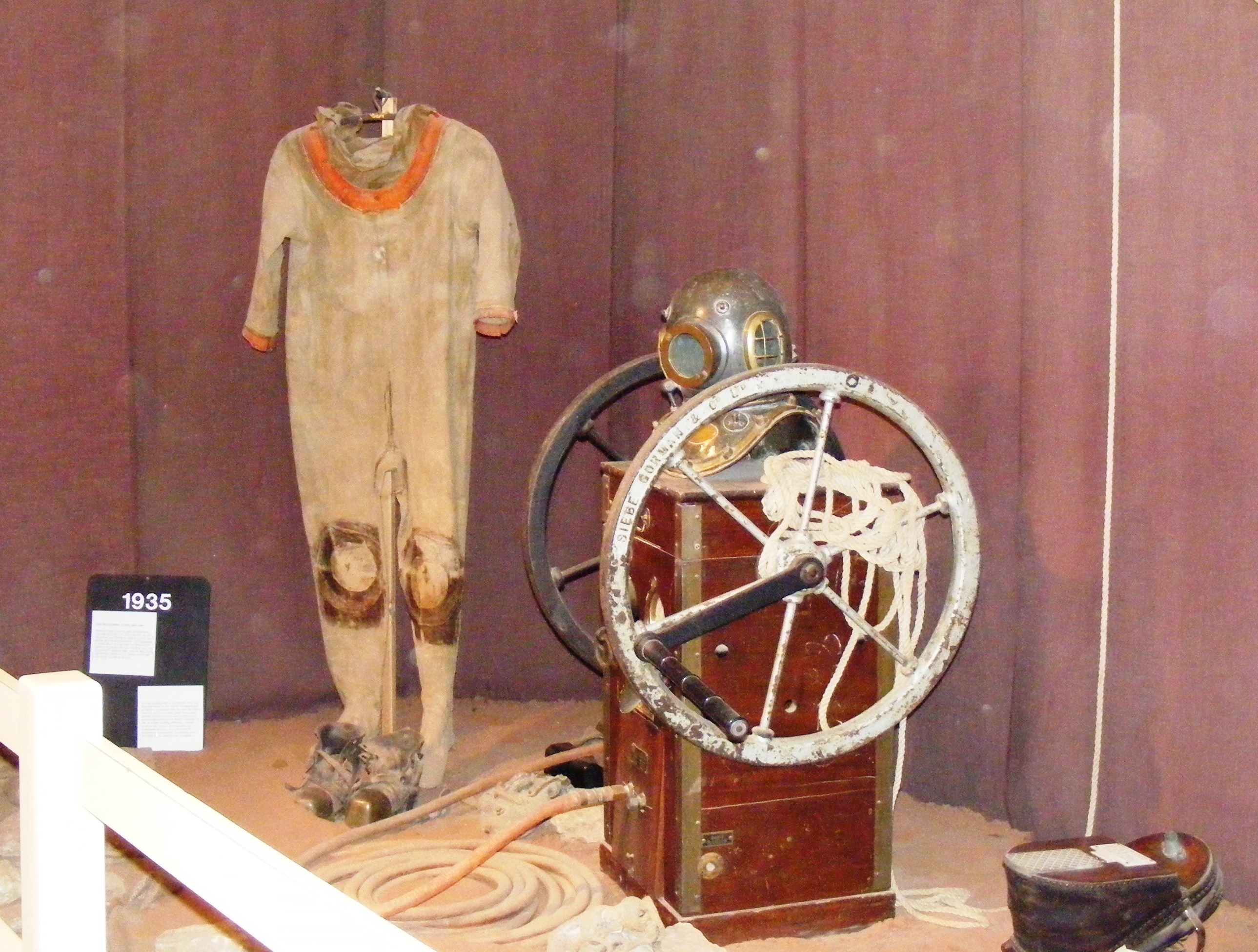
Cave-diving equipment from 1935 in the museum at Wookey Hole Caves

The Cave Diving Group (CDG) was established informally in the United Kingdom in 1935 to organise training and equipment for the exploration of flooded caves in the Mendip Hills of Somerset. The first dive was made by Jack Sheppard on 4 October 1936, using a home-made drysuit surface fed from a modified bicycle pump, which allowed Sheppard to pass Sump 1 of Swildon's Hole. Swildon's is an upstream feeder to the Wookey Hole resurgence system. The difficulty of access to the sump in Swildon's prompted operations to move to the resurgence, and the larger cave there allowed use of standard diving dress which was secured from the Siebe Gorman company. In UK cave-diving, the term "Sherpa" was used without irony for the people who carry the diver's gear although this has gone out of fashion; support is now more normally used, and before the development of SCUBA equipment such undertakings could be monumental operations.

Diving in the spacious third chamber of Wookey Hole led to a rapid series of advances, each of which was dignified by being given a successive number, until an air surface was reached at what is now known as "Chamber 9." Some of these dives were broadcast live on BBC Radio.

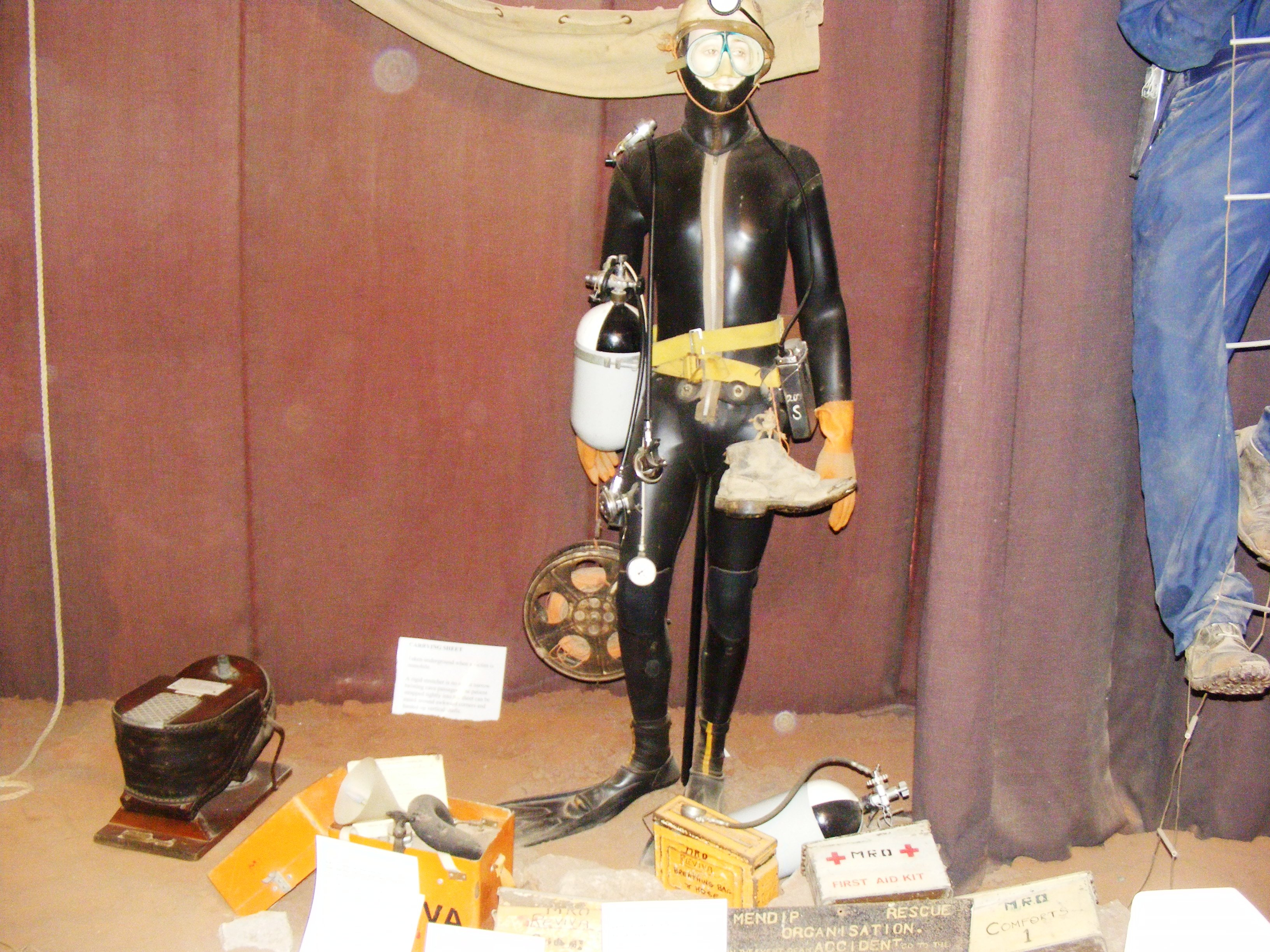
Cave-diving equipment in the museum at Wookey Hole Caves

The number of sites where standard diving dress could be used is clearly limited and there was little further progress before the outbreak of World War II reduced the caving community considerably. However, the rapid development of underwater warfare through the war made a lot of surplus equipment available. The CDG re-formed in 1946 and progress was rapid. Typical equipment at this time was a frogman rubber diving suit for insulation (water temperature in the UK is typically 4 °C), an oxygen diving cylinder, soda lime absorbent canister and counter-lung comprising a rebreather air system and an "AFLOLAUN", meaning "Apparatus For Laying Out Line And Underwater Navigation." The AFLOLAUN consisted of lights, line-reel, compass, notebook (for the survey), batteries, and more.

Progress was typically by "bottom walking", as this was considered less dangerous than swimming (note the absence of buoyancy controls). The use of oxygen put a depth limit on the dive, which was considerably compensated by the extended dive duration. This was the normal diving equipment and methods until approximately 1960 when new techniques using wetsuits (which provide both insulation and buoyancy ), twin open-circuit SCUBA air systems the development of side mounting cylinders, helmet-mounted lights and free-swimming with fins. The increasing capacity and pressure rating of air bottles also extended dive durations.

=== US history ===
In the 1970s, cave-diving greatly increased in popularity among divers in the United States. However, there were very few experienced cave divers and almost no formal classes to handle the surge in interest. The result was a large number of divers trying to cave dive without any formal training. This resulted in more than 100 fatalities over the course of the decade. The state of Florida came close to banning SCUBA diving around the cave entrances. The cave-diving organizations responded to the problem by creating training programs and certifying instructors, in addition to other measures to try to prevent these fatalities. This included posting signs, adding no-lights rules, and other enforcements.

In the United States, Sheck Exley was a pioneering cave diver who first explored many underwater cave systems in Florida, and many throughout the US and the world. On 6 February 1974, Exley became the first chairman of the Cave Diving Section of the National Speleological Society.

Since the 1980s, cave-diving education has greatly reduced diver fatalities, and it is now rare for an agency trained diver to perish in an underwater cave. Also in the 1980s, refinements were made to the equipment used for cave-diving, most importantly better lights with smaller batteries. In the 1990s, cave-diving equipment configurations became more standardized, due mostly to the adaptation and popularization of the "Hogarthian rig", developed by several North Florida cave divers, particularly William Hogarth Main, which promotes equipment choices that "keep it simple and streamlined".

=== Australian history ===
Four divers using scuba dived from the Right Imperial Cave in the Jenolan system in the Blue Mountains to an upstream chamber on 30 October 1954.

=== Europe ===
Before the development of underwater breathing equipment, speleologists explored submerged cavities on breathhold (apnea), and with the equipment of the period: swimming underwater in total darkness, and with candles and matches for subsequent exploration.

In 1909, Eugene Fournier explored the Rigole source in Perpignan, diving to a depth of four meters to explore the continuation of the cavity.

In 1924, Norbert Casteret explored the Montespan grotto in Haute-Garonne, where he swam through two successive siphons equipped with candles and matches.

Between 1936 and 1949, Max Cosyns explored various springs in Sainte Engrace, in Pais Vasco, Spain, passing through siphons on breathhold and then continuing the exploration.

After the development of scuba diving, the possibilities of cave diving have expanded. For example:

In 1953, the scouts of the La Verna Clan of Lyon (Letrone, Eppely and Ballandraux) explored the Lamina Zilua spring in Sainte Engrace (Sola), passing through three siphons and stopping at the very narrow entry to the fourth.

The Fernández Rubio brothers developed a new apnea technique for cave diving, which was used in the explorations of the Mairuelegorreta cave in 1959.

In 1965 and 1966, led by Max Cosyns, cave divers from Namur managed to climb the Kakueta Waterfall Cave (Cueva de la Cascada de Kakueta) to a fifth siphon 500 meters from the entrance, which despite diving to a depth of 30 m, they were unable to cross.

In 1973, the cave divers Barroumés and Larribau crossed the Erberua siphon (Labort), and discovered a gallery on the other side with an important archaeological site.

In 1973, the cave diver R. Jean (Fontaine la Tronche Group) crossed the first siphon of the Gouffre des Bourrugues (Larra), at a depth of 305 m below the surface.

In 1980-81 Fred Vergier passed the first 3 siphons of Sima de las Puertas de Illamina (BU-56), reaching a depth of -1338 m. In 1986 divers from the Grupo Studenets Pleven of Bulgaria passed through the fourth siphon, reaching a depth of -1355 meters. In 1987, members of the same club passed the 5th and 6th siphons, subsequently exploring a wide gallery 650 meters long, and reaching the level of -1408 m, at the time the second deepest known chasm.

== Organisations ==
Several organisations exist to support caving and cave diving. Some of them also specifically train and certify cave divers to their own standards. There are also organisations dedicated to exploration, survey, and mapping of cave systems, both dry and flooded.

=== Cave Divers Association of Australia ===
The Cave Divers Association of Australia (CDAA) is a cave diving organisation which was formed in September 1973 to represent the interests of recreational scuba divers who dive in water-filled caves and sinkholes principally in the Lower South East (now called the Limestone Coast) of South Australia (SA) and secondly in other parts of Australia. Its formation occurred after a series of diving fatalities in water-filled caves and sinkholes in the Mount Gambier region between 1969 and 1973 and in parallel to a South Australian Government inquiry into these deaths. The CDAA's major achievement has been the dramatic reduction of fatalities via the introduction of a site rating scheme and an associated testing system which was brought in during the mid-1970s. While its major area of operation is in the Limestone Coast region of SA, it administrates and supports cave diving activity in other parts of Australia including the Nullarbor Plain and Wellington, New South Wales.

=== Cave Diving Group ===
The Cave Diving Group (CDG) is a United Kingdom-based diver training organisation specialising in cave diving.

The CDG was founded in 1946 by Graham Balcombe, making it the world's oldest continuing diving club. Graham Balcombe and Jack Sheppard pioneered cave diving in the late 1930s, notably at Wookey Hole in Somerset.

=== National Association for Cave Diving ===
The National Association for Cave Diving (NACD) is a 501(c)(3) non-profit corporation founded in 1968 with the goal of improving the safety of scuba diving in caves through diver training and education. Its headquarters are in Gainesville, Florida but administration and operations are conducted from High Springs, Florida. The NACD is overseen by a board of directors composed of seven cave divers, four instructors, and three other directors. The elected officers are a president, vice president, secretary/treasurer, and training director. Membership is open to all who have an interest in underwater caves. The NACD publishes a quarterly journal, and various specialised publications, holds seminars, and workshops, and sponsors cave diving projects.

The goals of the NACD are:

- To establish and maintain current guidelines in the form of physical and psychological standards, as well as equipment and techniques necessary for safe cave diving,
- To encourage education and dissemination of safe cave diving information throughout the facilities of the organization and to provide a program of education and advanced training essential for safe cave diving,
- To achieve closer cooperation and understanding among members of the cave and recreational diving communities (and the general public) so they may work together toward the common goal of increasing safety in cavern and cave diving,
- To explore underwater caves and to encourage education and dissemination of information to government, private industry and the general public. To accomplish these goals the NACD is organized to provide the following services

NACD offers training and certification in cavern and cave diving, and instructor courses. The goal is not to encourage cavern or cave diving, but to aid divers in becoming safe cavern and cave divers. The NACD provides training standards to define their technical and philosophical principles of cave and cavern diving, but allows the instructors discretion and freedom use their own knowledge, experience, and teaching style, and acknowledges that many aspects of cave and cavern diving practice, procedure, and equipment configuration remain open to interpretation by equally qualified experts and that it is in the best interest of the student to be presented with differing views.

The NACD philosophy of safe cave diving is based on a system of checks and balances to insure that NACD standards are maintained in each course. The courses available are as described below:

The cavern diving course develops minimum skills, knowledge, dive planning abilities, problem solving procedures and the basic abilities to safely cavern dive. These skills are useful in all types of diving. The course is taught in over a minimum of two days and includes classroom lectures, field exercises, open water line drills and a minimum of four cavern dives. This course emphasizes planning, procedures, environment, propulsion techniques, buoyancy skills, problem solving, equipment modification and the specialized needs of the cavern diver. The prerequisite qualification is Advanced Open Water Diver or equivalent.

The Introduction to Cave Diving course further develops cave diving proficiency within the limitations of a single tank. It is taught over a minimum of two days and includes a minimum of four single tank cave dives. The course helps hone the skills learned on the cavern diving course, and teaches new skills and procedures for limited single tank cave penetration. It is considered a recreational cave diving course, and does not include obligatory decompression. The prerequisite qualification is cavern diver or equivalent and 25 logged non-training dives.

The Apprentice Cave Diver course is a training level which expires after a year if the full cave certification is not completed. It is an introduction to jump and gap procedures. The prerequisites are NACD Introduction to Cave or equivalent.

The full Cave Diver course covers is equipment configuration, decompression problem solving, jumps, circuits, traverses, and surveying. The prerequisite is NACD Introduction to Cave or equivalent.

NACD offers specialty cave diver training for the fully certified cave diver. Courses offered are:

- Exploration/survey techniques
- Stage diving
- Side mount diving
- Submersible Diver propulsion vehicle techniques
- Photography
- Videography

Four instructor certification levels are available.

- Cavern Instructor
- Introduction to Cave Instructor
- Cave Instructor
- Specialty Cave Instructor

=== National Speleological Society ===
The National Speleological Society (NSS) is an organization formed in 1941 to advance the exploration, conservation, study, and understanding of caves in the United States. Originally headquartered in Washington D.C., its current offices are in Huntsville, Alabama. The organization engages in the research and scientific study, restoration, exploration, and protection of caves. It has more than 10,000 members in more than 250 grottos. Since 1974 there has been as cave diving section of the society.

=== Quintana Roo Speleological Survey ===
The Quintana Roo Speleological Survey (QRSS) was established in 1990 for the safe exploration, survey and cartography of the underwater and dry caves and cenotes of Quintana Roo, Mexico, supported by the National Speleological Society.

The survey principally acts as a data repository for explored sites within the state of Quintana Roo and distributes summary statistical tables through its webpage, which as of February, 2011 included 208 underwater cave systems with a total surveyed length of 910.4 kilometers (565.7 mi), and 50 caves above the water table with a total length of 41.8 kilometers (26.0 mi).

=== Woodville Karst Plains Project ===
The Woodville Karst Plain Project (WKPP is a project and organization that maps the underwater cave systems underlying the Woodville Karst Plain, a 450-square-mile (1,200 km^{2}) area from Tallahassee, Florida, U.S. to the Gulf of Mexico which includes several first magnitude springs, including Wakulla Springs, and the Leon Sinks cave system, the longest underwater cave in the United States. The project grew out of a cave diving research and exploration group established in 1985 and incorporated in 1990 (by Bill Gavin and Bill Main, later joined by Parker Turner, Lamar English and Bill McFaden, at the time the chairman of the NACD Exploration and Survey Committee).

== Cave-diving regions ==
Cave-diving venues can be found on all continents except Antarctica, where the average temperature is too low for water to remain liquid in caves.

There are few flooded caves in Africa which are known and accessible. There are several in South Africa, a few in Namibia and Zimbabwe, and some large caves recently discovered in Madagascar.

There are a large number of flooded caves in the limestone regions and other regions of Asia, particularly in the karst regions of China and Southeast Asia. Some are accessible for recreational cave-diving, but most have probably not yet been found or explored.

Australia has many spectacular water filled caves and sinkholes, many of them in the Mount Gambier region of South Australia.

Europe has a large number of flooded caves, particularly in the karst regions.

North America has many cave-diving venues, particularly in Florida, USA, and the Yucatán Peninsula of Mexico.

South America has some cave-diving venues in Brazil.

The islands of The Bahamas have large number of underwater caves and blue holes found throughout the archipelago.

== Terminology ==
Caves and caverns as geographical entities are defined differently from cave-diving and cavern-diving, so it is possible to be cavern diving in what is technically a cave, and cave-diving in what is technically a cavern.

cave
A cavity or chamber in the earth with an entrance, some part of which is unreachable by direct natural light, large enough for human entry. There are several classes of cave. Some definitions specify a natural cavity caused by geological processes.
cavern
A type of cave comprising a system of naturally formed chambers in the earth connected by passages. Some authorities do not distinguish between caves and caverns.
cave diving
Diving in a cave, cavern, or mine where the exit to open water with a surface in contact with the atmosphere is not always visible by natural illumination from all points of the dive, or where the direct, accessible route to the free surface in contact with the atmosphere is more than an arbitrarily specified distance, commonly 130 feet (40 m), but also quoted as 60 metres (200 ft), from the diver at any time.
cavern diving
Diving in a cave, cavern, or mine where the exit to open water with a surface in contact with the atmosphere is always visible by natural illumination from all points of the dive, or where the direct, accessible route to the free surface in contact with the atmosphere is less than an arbitrarily specified distance, commonly 130 feet (40 m), but also quoted as 60 metres (200 ft), from the diver at any time.

=== Types of cave dive ===
A cave dive can be categorised by the topology of the route, which can be linear, include a circuit, or be a traverse.

linear
A dive route in which the divers return by the same route as the one they entered by.
circuit
A dive route in which the divers return partly or completely by a different route to the one they entered by, using the entrance also as the exit.
traverse
A dive route in which the divers pass through a cave from one entrance to another exit.
simple
When used to describe a circuit or traverse, simple implies that the full route can be completed before the divers reach critical pressure (generally two thirds of initial pressure, or a pressure calculated for the dive plan) on the breathing gas supply, so it should be possible to safely turn the dive and return along the original route to the starting point at any time.
complex
When used to describe a circuit or traverse, complex implies that the full route cannot be completed before the divers reach critical pressure on the breathing gas supply. In this case a setting up dive is done first, and the position reached at turnaround pressure is marked with a cookie and the divers return along the same route (linear path). They then dive the route in the other direction, and if they reach the cookie before reaching critical pressure for the same starting gas supply, they know the remaining gas is sufficient to complete the circuit or traverse if it goes according to plan. This is called proving the traverse or proving the circuit.

=== Caves by flow type ===
These terms describe flooded cave areas with reference to flow direction.

Cave where water flows out of the entrance used for diving. The flow will generally help divers on the way out.
sink

A cave where water flows into the entrance used for diving, which can hinder divers from getting out.
sump

A locally low-lying water filled passage of a cave. A cave may have several sumps separated by unflooded or partially flooded areas.

=== Types of cave by method of formation ===
aeolian cave

Cave caused by wind erosion.
coral cave
Enclosed spaces in coral reefs, created by the growth of stony corals.
flooded mine

Flooded mines and other underground spaces excavated by people and their machinery, by technical definition are not caves, but the activity of diving in such spaces is considered cave-diving, as the procedures and equipment are the same.
lava tube

Caves caused by volcanic action, where a lava flow cools and solidifies on the outside, and the fluid interior lava flows out at the lower end when the supply stops. They may be branched, but are usually continuously sloped. Other caves formed through volcanic activity include rifts, lava molds, open vertical conduits, inflationary, and blister caves.
littoral cave
sea cave

Cave along the shore of a coastal area. Usually created by wave action, and may be affected by tidal currents and wave surge.
solution cave

Cave formed by groundwater dissolving the rock over long periods. They are more common in rocks which are more soluble in mildly acidic water, such as limestones and dolomites, and may be common in karst regions.
talus cave

Cave formed by rock falls.

=== Types of cave by topology ===
- simple, linear, unbranched
- simply branched
- network, complex branched, anastomosed.

== See also ==
- Anchialine system – Landlocked body of water with underground connection to the sea
- Caving – Recreational pastime of exploring cave systems
- Hydrology – Science of the movement, distribution, and quality of water on Earth
- Penetration diving – Diving under a physical barrier to a direct vertical ascent to the surface
- Speleology – Science of cave and karst systems
- Technical diving – Diving beyond the scope of recreational diving
- Wreck diving – Recreational diving on wrecks

Notable cave divers:

- David Apperley – Australian cave diver
- Craig Challen – Australian veterinary surgeon and technical diver
- Sheck Exley – American cave and deep diving pioneer and record breaker
- Martyn Farr – British cave diver
- Nuno Gomes – South African diver and holder of scuba depth record
- Jill Heinerth – Canadian cave diver (born 1965)
- Paul Hosie – Australian cave diver
- Dave Shaw – Australian technical diver (1954–2005)
- Edd Sorenson - Florida cave diver, IUCRR member and Cave Adventurers owner
- Rick Stanton – British cave diver who specialises in rescues
- William Stone – American engineer, caver and explorer
- John Volanthen – British volunteer cave rescue diver
- Andrew Wight – Australian screenwriter and producer (1959–2012)
- Patricia Beddows – Canadian hydrogeologist and educator - co-founder of the Cave Pearl Project, member of Women Divers Hall of Fame

Other:

- Disappearance of Ben McDaniel – Scuba diver who disappeared during or after a cave dive

== Sources ==
- "Skin Diver Killed in Submerged Cave", The New York Times, 16 May 1955, Page 47.
- Basic Cave Diving: A Blueprint for Survival, Sheck Exley 1977.
