= Descent =

Descent may refer to:

== As a noun ==
=== Genealogy and inheritance ===
- Common descent, concept in evolutionary biology
- Kinship, one of the major concepts of cultural anthropology
  - Pedigree chart or family tree
  - Ancestry
  - Lineal descendant
  - Heritage
  - Royal descent - lineal descent from a monarch
- Phylogenetics
  - Tree diagram (disambiguation)
- Inheritance (law and property)

=== Mathematics ===
- Infinite descent, a method going back to Fermat to solve Diophantine equations
- Descent (mathematics), an idea extending the notion of "gluing" in topology
- Hadamard's method of descent, a technique for solving partial differential equations
- Gradient descent, a first-order optimization algorithm going back to Newton
- Descents in permutations, a classical permutation statistic in combinatorics

=== Other uses ===
- Descent (aeronautics), the decrease of an aircraft in altitude during flight
- Descent (font), the distance that a typeface descends below the baseline in typography
- Katabasis

== As a proper name ==
=== Film ===
- The Descent, a 2005 horror film
  - The Descent Part 2, the 2009 sequel to the 2005 film
- Descent (2007 film), a thriller film starring Rosario Dawson
- Descent (2017 film), a Nigerian film

=== Gaming ===
- Descent (video game), first in a series from Interplay Entertainment and Parallax Software
  - Descent II, sequel to Descent
  - Descent 3, sequel to Descent II
- Descent: FreeSpace – The Great War, a 1998 space combat simulation computer game
- Descent: Journeys in the Dark, a 2005 board game by Fantasy Flight Games
- Dragon Age: Inquisition – The Descent, a 2015 downloadable content pack for Dragon Age: Inquisition

=== Literature ===
- Descent: An Irresistible Tragicomedy of Everyday Life, a 2004 novel by Sabrina Broadbent
- The Descent (novel), by Jeff Long
- Descent (magazine), a magazine about caving
- Descent (journal), a genealogy journal published by the Society of Australian Genealogists

=== Music ===
- Descent (Immolation album), 2026
- Descent (Orbit Culture album), 2023
- "Descent" (song), a song by Fear Factory from Obsolete
- Descent, an album by the band This Burning Effigy
- "Descent", a song by Celldweller from Soundtrack for the Voices in My Head Vol. 01
- "Descent", a song by Godflesh from Us and Them
- "Descent", a song by Humanity's Last Breath from Välde
- "Descent", a song by Knut from Bastardiser
- "Descent", a song by Neurosis from Times of Grace
- "Descent", a song by Sylosis from A Sign of Things to Come
- "A Descent", a song by Born of Osiris from A Higher Place
- "The Descent", a song by Insomnium from Shadows of the Dying Sun (bonus track)
- "The Descent", a song by Polaris from The Death of Me

=== Television ===
- "Descent" (NCIS: Los Angeles), a 2013 episode of NCIS: Los Angeles
- "Descent" (The Outer Limits), a 1999 episode of The Outer Limits
- "Descent" (Stargate SG-1), a 2002 episode of Stargate SG-1
- "Descent" (Star Trek: The Next Generation), a two-part 1993 episode of Star Trek: The Next Generation
- "Descent" (Star Wars Resistance)
- "The Descent" (The Vampire Diaries), a 2011 episode of The Vampire Diaries
- "Descent" (X-Men: The Animated Series), a 1997 episode
- Descent, a 2024 Australian online comedy series released by Grouse House

== See also ==
- Dissent (homophone)
