= List of caving organizations =

There are a number of caving organizations throughout the world.

== UIS ==
The Union Internationale de Spéléologie (UIS) is the international umbrella organization for caving and speleology.

== Austria ==
The Austrian Speleological Association, formed in 1949, represents over 20 caving clubs, with some 2500 members and about 30 show caves in Austria, and is the Austrian member of UIS and FSE.

== Australia ==
- Australian Speleological Federation (ASF) is a national organisation formed in 1956. It is an environmental organisation promoting the protection of Australia's unique cave systems.

== Bosnia and Herzegovina ==
The Speleological Society Ponir (SD Ponir) was founded in 1984 in Banja Luka. The main activities of the society are cave exploration and research. In furtherance of this, SD Ponir conducts training of new members through courses and caving expeditions. The training includes theoretical courses (training in the form of lectures related to: speleohistory, speleomorphology, biospeleology, topography, first aid, etc.) and practical training (use of caving equipment and mastering verticals, and cave surveying). SD Ponir has organized a number of expeditions, which has explored many caves in the territory of BiH. SD Ponir is currently exploring the two biggest ones in the territory of BiH-Jojkinovac (460m deep).

== Brazil ==
- Brazilian Speleological Society (SBE) is a national organisation formed in 1969. SBE is member of UIS (Union International de Spéléologie) and FEALC (Federación Espeleológica de América Latina y el Caribe).

== Bulgaria ==
The Bulgarian Federation on Speleology is the only national organization in Bulgaria whose role is essentially devoted to Speleology. The Federation represents the Bulgarian cavers and speleologists. In this capacity, it organizes National Congresses, and within the International Union of Speleology it nominates the Bulgarian delegates at the International Congresses. The Federation co-ordinates both the activities of Bulgarian cavers abroad, establishing contacts with the corresponding Societies, and the activity of foreign cavers in Bulgaria.

== Canada ==
There is no national caving organization in Canada, despite the existence of a national publication (the Canadian Caver, started in 1968), and the Caving Canada website. Regional organizations exist in British Columbia and Quebec, and caving clubs exist in many of the provinces (Alberta Speleological Society, Northern British Columbia Caving Club, Speleological Society of Manitoba, etc.) and cities (Toronto Caving Group).

== China ==
Hong Meigui is an international society dedicated to the exploration of caves in China and throughout the world.

== Croatia ==
Hrvatska Gorska Služba Spašavanja is the Croatian Mountain Rescue service. It is involved in international cave rescue, such as the Morca Cave.

== Czech Republic ==
Czech Speleological Society (Česká speleologická společnost) is the national organisation with many caving clubs as members.

== Europe ==
The Fédération Spéléologique Européenne / European Speleological Federation (FSE) is the European organisation which federates the national caving federations/associations in Europe.

== France ==
French Federation of Speleology is the national organisation with many caving clubs as members.

== Germany ==
The German Speleological Federation was founded in 1955 and is the German member of UIS and FSE.

== Greece ==
- The Hellenic Speleological Federation is the only secondary national organisation in Greece and has many caving clubs as members. There are a number of independent clubs outside the Federation.
- The Hellenic Speleological Society (established in 1950) is a nationwide caving society in Greece. With six (6) Branches and main offices in Athens conducts Caving Expeditions and Studies all over the country.

== Hungary ==
The Hungarian Speleology Society was founded in 1926, but was reorganised in 1958 under the name of Hungarian Karst- and Cave Research Society (MKBT). MKBT carries out speleological research and exploration in Hungary. The national yearly publication is called Karszt és Barlang (meaning Karst and Cave).

== India ==
The National Cave Research and Protection Organization is the Non-Government Organisation Registered for cave Research & their Protection in India.

Speleological Association of India (SAI) is a registered non-profit organization launched on 4 October 2021. Through scientific exploration, study, research, public education, awareness, and training, the organization aims to inculcate a sense of ownership and stewardship; which will lead to conservation, protection, and advocacy of the caves, karsts and other systems in Indian Subcontinent.

== Indonesia ==
The Indonesian Speleological Society (ISS) formed in 2015 with some 1000 members and is the Indonesian member of UIS. Their website is caves.or.id

== Iran ==
The Iranian Cave and Speleology Association (ICSA) is a non-governmental organisation (NGO) consisting of cavers and speleologists in Iran who are interested in exploring, surveying, researching and protecting the caves of Iran. The International Speleology Union (UIS) helped with the foundation of the ICSA by training cavers and supporting them. It was founded in 2010 with permission from the Ministry of Interior. ICSA now helps governmental organisation (Such as Environment Protection Organisation, Tourism Organisation, Universities) and other non-governmental organisations (like Red Crescent Society of the Islamic Republic of Iran, Iranian Geologist Association, Iranian Photographer Association) with such issues.

Note: Iranian Federation of Mountaineering and Sport Climbing is the governmental organisation of Mountain Sports which regards caving as a sport. Focused on the sporting aspect of caving, they provide training to cavers.

== Ireland ==
The Speleological Union of Ireland is the official representative body for cavers in Ireland. It is also affiliated with the Irish Cave Rescue Organisation which operates in both the Republic Of Ireland and Northern Ireland.

== Israel ==
Israel Cave Explorers Club is the largest and most active caving club in Israel. It was founded in 2016, and the members are involved with organising international caving expeditions, surveying, conservation, hosting caver expeditions in Israel, and helping the local archaeological bodies in excavating, mapping and finding caves around Israel.

== Italy ==
The Italian Speleological Society is the official representative body for many cavers and Groups in Italy.

The Circolo Speleologico Romano was founded in 1904, is one of the oldest caving clubs in Italy. Currently, more than 250 caving groups and clubs are present in the country, with about 4,000 active cavers.

== Kosovo ==
The Speleological Federation of Kosovo was formed in February 2011. In 2003 the first speleo association was formed (Aragonit Speleo Association), independent from the mountain association of Gjeravica from the western city of Peja (formed 1928), where it worked as a speleo-section. It is working on completing data for all the caves in this country, and also organizing different speleo-expeditions throughout the country. www.aragonit-speleo.org www.facebook.com/aragonitkosovo

== Kyrgyzstan ==
Foundation for the Preservation and Exploration of Caves (FPEC) was formed in 2010. The main activities are: Complex Speleological Investigation of karst and caves in Central Asia; Speleoarchaeology; Paleoclimate; Biospeleology; etc. FPEC is a member of UIS since July 2017.

== Lebanon ==
Speleo Club du Liban was formed in 1951. It is considered one of the oldest caving associations in the Middle East.

== Jamaica ==
The Jamaican Caves Organisation (JCO) is the national caving organisation for Jamaica, and a member of the Union Internationale de Spéléologie (UIS). Activities include speleological research, exploration, mapping, and pro bono assistance to the National Environmental and Planning Agency (NEPA), the Water Resources Authority (WRA), the University of the West Indies (UWI), and visiting researchers.

== México ==
- Grupo Espeleológico Ajau - Ajau Speleological Group, an organization made up of enthusiasts and professionals from many different disciplines, does exploration and research mainly in and around the Yucatán Peninsula.

== Mongolia ==
- Mongolian Cave Research Association is a Nongovernmental Organization (NGO). Mongolian Cave Research Association was established in 2007 and conducts a varied range of cave expeditions in Mongolia.

== Netherlands ==
Speleo Nederland is the national organisation with four regional sections. The national 3 monthly publication is called "Pierk" (meaning stalactite).

== New Zealand ==
The New Zealand Speleological Society is a national organisation with local clubs that represents recreational cavers.

== Norway ==
Norsk Grotteforbund (The Norwegian Speleological Society) is the national organisation. It was established in 1980.

== Pakistan ==
Chiltan Adventurers Association Balochistan and Pakistan Cave Research & Caving Federation the only National Caving Organization in Pakistan founded by Hayatullah Khan Durrani representative of Union of International Speleology(UIS), and British Caving Federation (BCA) through Orpheus Caving Club Derby UK.

== Poland ==
Caving Committee of Polish Mountaineering Association (Polski Związek Alpinizmu) represents the Polish caving community as a whole.

In Poland, caving community has been traditionally tied closely to mountaineering. Polish Mountaineering Association gathers 26 local associations whose main profile is recreational caving and cave exploration.

== Portugal ==
- Federação Portuguesa de Espeleologia
- The Portuguese Speleological Society was founded on 1948.

== Romania ==
The Romanian Speleological Federation was founded on 28 May 1994 by the association of all speleological structures from Romania, having as goal to strengthen the national speleological activities. FRS is a member of UIS (Union International de Spéléologie), affiliated to UNESCO.

== Russia ==
- Russian Speleological Union (Rossijskij sojuz speleologov, RSS) is all-Russian public organization which unites the speleologists of Russia.
- Ekaterinburg Speleo Club (SGS)

== Slovenia ==
- The Speleological Association of Slovenia (Jamarska zveza Slovenije, JZS) is constituted by multiple national caving clubs. The association organizes commissions that deal with caving operations such as cave rescue, registry, conservation, education and the publishing of various caving-related journals.

== South Africa ==
- Cave Research Organisation of South Africa (CROSA)
- The South African Speleological Association (SASA), is the national body for caving in South Africa (Self Nominated).
- Speleological Exploration Club (SEC)

== South Korea ==
- Dongguk Universiry Caving Club (DUCC), located in Seoul, was founded in 1970. the oldest university-based caving organization in South Korea.
- Korea Caving Association (KSA)

== Spain ==
- The Federación Española de Espeleología is the Spanish Speleological Association. There are also twelve Regional Associations ("Federaciones Autonómicas" in Spanish), and people must be associated with one of them so they can do caving.
- GERS de l'A.E. Muntanya is a group from Barcelona focused on the exploration of new caves in Pirineos mountains and urban speleology.

== Sweden ==
The Swedish Speleological Society is the national body for caving in Sweden. It was founded in 1966 by the "Father of Swedish Speleology", Leander Tell.

== Switzerland ==
The Swiss Society of Speleology was created in 1939 in Geneva.

== Turkey ==
- MF (Speleological Federation of Turkey, Turkish Cavers Union)
- Cave Research Association is the oldest cave research association in Turkey. Its central organisation is in Ankara and it has a branch in Bursa. MAD arranges cave expeditions and promotes speleology in Turkey. MAD has more than 100 members with approximately 40 of them actively working.
- BÜMAK (Boğaziçi University Speleological Society) is the oldest University Club of the country. The Club has explored EGMA, deepest cave in Turkey (-1429 m deep) and is still actively finding and exploring new caves all around the country.
- BUMAD (Boğaziçi International Cave Exploration Society) is a caving society relatively recently founded but full of experienced members. Participated in ecological survey of the Thrace region and still actively searching for new caves.
- ESMAD (Eskişehir Cave Research Association)
- ANÜMAB (Ankara University Cave Research Unit) was founded on November 4, 2004. ANÜMAB makes scientific researches which include geological, biological and archaeological studies in Turkey, mostly Ankara and its surround.
- İTÜMAK (İstanbul Technical University Cave Exploration Society) is a University Club that has been continuing its work since 2007.
- UMAST (Uludag University Cave Exploration Society)

== Ukraine ==
- The Ukrainian Speleological Association (Ukr.S.A.) is a Ukrainian national non-profit membership organization created in 1992, member of Union Internationale de Spéléologie (UIS) since 1992 and European Speleological Federation (ESF) since 2012. The main goal is to support and develop the caving activities of clubs, sections and individual members. Every year the organization conducts expeditions to the world's deepest caves, for example Krubera Cave.

== United Kingdom ==
- The British Caving Association is the national body for caving in the United Kingdom. It represents all those persons and groups with a genuine interest in caves, karst and associated phenomena, whether from a strictly sporting viewpoint, a scientific viewpoint, or a combination of both.
- The British Cave Research Association is a constituent body of the British Caving Association and promotes the study of caves and associated phenomena. The association encourages original exploration, collects and publishes speleological information, and organises educational events.
- The Council of Higher Education Caving Clubs acts as an umbrella group for all university caving clubs to facilitate interactions within and between clubs, and to represent them to higher caving authorities within the UK and Europe.

== United States ==
- The National Speleological Society (NSS) is a national non-profit membership organization formed in 1941 with the purpose "to promote interest in and to advance in any and all ways the study and science of speleology, the protection of caves and their natural contents, and to promote fellowship among those interested therein." Most of the Society's approximately 12,000 members belong to local chapters known as Grottos. The Society maintains an active online discussion forum to discuss caving. Anyone interested in caving or caves is invited to participate.
- The Cave Research Foundation (CRF) is an American private, non-profit group dedicated to the exploration, research, and conservation of caves.
