= MCRA =

MCRA may refer to:

- Marine Corps Reserve Association
- McrA RNA motif
- Medical Care Recovery Act
- Mendip Cave Registry and Archive
- Mineralocorticoid receptor antagonist
