= Artur Kozłowski (speleologist) =

Polish cave diver (1977–2011)

- Born: 17 October 1977; Poznań, Poland
- Died: 5 September 2011 (aged 33); Gort, County Galway, Ireland
- Known for: Record-breaking cave diver and explorer

Artur "Conrad" Kozłowski (17 October 1977 – 5 September 2011) was a Polish cave diver who spent his last years in Ireland. Amongst other achievements in cave exploration, he set the record for the deepest cave dive in Great Britain and Ireland at a depth of 103 m (338 ft).

== Biography ==
=== Career ===
Kozłowski came to Ireland from Poznań, in Poland, in 2006 and worked as a quantity surveyor. His projects included the Aviva Stadium and Heuston Square developments in Dublin. He would later play an important role in compiling maps for Galway County Council and the National Roads Authority for the design and development of the N18 road (Now the M18 motorway).

=== Introduction to cave diving ===
When he moved to Ireland, Kozłowski was a qualified diver, with 13 warm open water dives under his belt. Shortly after his arrival he became interested in underwater cave exploration, and began learning cave diving with the Welsh cave diving instructor Martyn Farr in 2007.

He began diving in the Hell Complex, part of the Green Holes group of underwater sea caves off Doolin, County Clare and initially used the area as a training ground for his newly acquired skills. He soon began exploring and mapping undiscovered passage, and by July 2007, he had made his first significant breakthrough, making the first traverse between Hell's Kitchen and Robertson's Cave in the nearby Reef Complex.

=== Exploration ===
Kozłowski was responsible for many extensions to cave systems in both Ireland and Spain, the most notable being the extension to the Marble Arch Caves system in County Fermanagh. In 2009 and 2010 diving connections were made to nearby cave systems by Kozłowski, firstly to Prod's Pot – Cascades Rising, doubling the total length of the system from 4.5 to 9 km (5.6 mi), and subsequently to newly established Monastir Sink – Upper Cradle system, extending the wider system further to 11.5 km (7.1 mi). The discoveries make this the longest cave in Northern Ireland.

In 2008 he set the record for the deepest cave dive in Great Britain and Ireland at a depth of 103 m (338 ft) in Pollatoomary, near Killavally, County Mayo, Ireland. Perhaps his most notable achievement was the exploration of over 10 km (6.2 mi) of underwater passage in the notoriously unforgiving cave passages of the Gort region, including the discovery and exploration of Pollindre, 1 km in length and the third deepest sump in Great Britain and Ireland at 82 m (269 ft).

In March 2011 Kozłowski received the Kolosy award for cave exploration at the annual Polish travelling and outdoor sports conference, held in Gdynia.

== Writing and public speaking ==
Kozłowski was a passionate advocate of exploration and diving; his blog recounted in detail his underwater adventures. His latest discoveries filled the pages of the journal Irish Speleology and Descent magazine.

He was also an engaging public speaker; his January 2011 talk at NUIG/GMIT Sub Aqua Club was well received.

== Death and legacy ==
Kozłowski died during a cave dive in the Gort lowlands on 5 September 2011. His body was successfully recovered on 10 September 2011 after an extensive recovery effort over several days by a team including Jim Warny, Jason Mallinson, Rick Stanton and John Volanthen. The cave in which he died is called Pollonora 10, in Kiltartan, County Galway, Ireland, and his body was found at the then known limits of the cave, at a depth of −52 m (−171 ft) and approximately 810 m (2,660 ft) from the entrance.

On 15 September, Kozłowski was buried in the nearby cemetery after a service at St Attracta's church, attended by gardaí, divers and members of the Irish Cave Rescue Organisation, friends, family and members of the local community.

In August 2012, in recognition of his contribution to Irish speleology, the Speleological Union of Ireland set up the Kozłowski Fund to support original cave exploration in Ireland.

In 2013, a fundraising page was set up in order to pay for a headstone for Kozłowski's grave in Kiltartan, and for a plaque to be erected at the entrance to Pollonora 10. The plaque and headstone were engraved by a Gort-based stonemason and on 6 September 2014, marking the third anniversary of Kozłowski's death, the gravestone and plaque were unveiled to a gathering of friends and family.
