= Read's Cavern =

Cave in Somerset, England

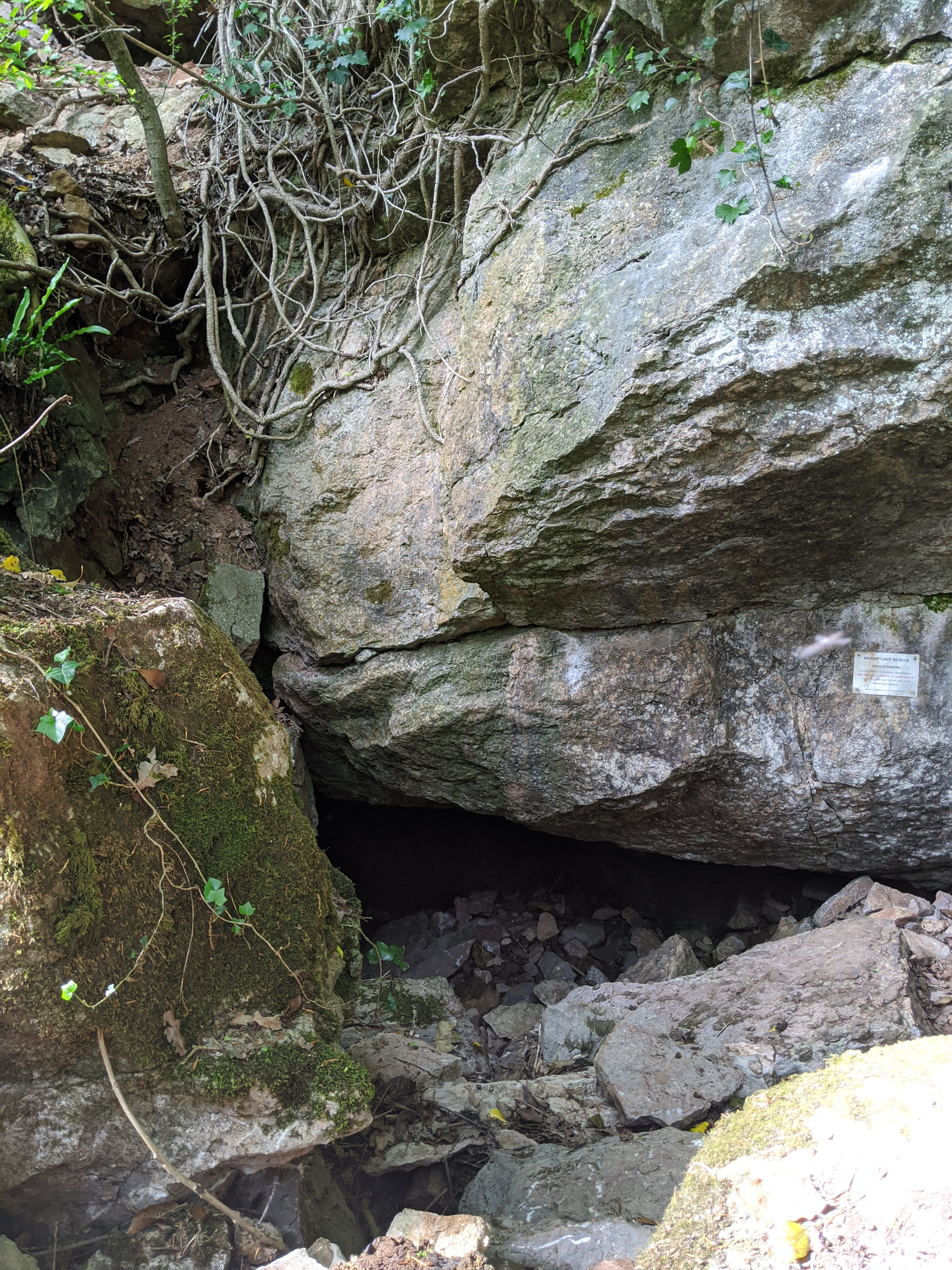
- Read's Cavern entrance

- Location within Somerset
- Location: Burrington Combe, Somerset, UK
- OS grid: ST 4682 5844
- Coordinates: 51°19′21″N 2°45′52″W
- Depth: 62 metres (203 ft)
- Length: 1,224 metres (4,016 ft)
- Elevation: 151 metres (495 ft)
- Discovery: 13 1919 UBSS
- Geology: Limestone
- Entrances: 2
- Hazards: loose boulders
- Access: Free
- BRAC grade: DC
- Registry: Mendip Cave Registry

Read's Cavern is a cave at Burrington Combe, Somerset, England, in which traces of Iron Age occupation have been found. It lies under Dolebury Hill. Its large main chamber has a boulder ruckle floor and is parallel to a cliff face. The cave was excavated by the University of Bristol Spelæological Society (UBSS) in the 1920s, when relics of Iron Age occupation were found.

The UBSS excavation followed the removal of 21 tonnes of limestone material below a cliff where a stream sinks. Among the finds were ironwork described as slave shackles.

After its discovery, the cave was first known as Keltic or Celtic Cavern until the Ordnance Survey decided that it should be known as Read's Cavern, after Mr. R. F. Read, the discoverer. It has also been called "Gough's Cave".
