= Sidcot Swallet =

Cave in Somerset, England

- Location within Somerset
- Location: Burrington Combe, Somerset, England
- OS grid: ST47545828
- Coordinates: 51°19′17″N 2°45′15″W
- Depth: 28 metres (92 ft)
- Length: 206 metres (676 ft)
- Elevation: 149 metres (489 ft)
- Geology: Limestone
- Entrances: 1
- Difficulty: Easy
- Hazards: None
- Access: Free
- Registry: Mendip Cave Registry

Sidcot Swallet is a cave near Burrington Combe, in the Carboniferous Limestone of the Mendip Hills, in Somerset, England.

It was named after the Sidcot School Speleological Society who explored it in 1925.

A swallet, also known as a sinkhole, sink, shakehole, swallow hole or doline, is a natural depression or hole in the surface topography caused by the removal of soil or bedrock, often both, by water flowing beneath.

After Goatchurch Cavern, Sidcot Swallet is probably the most popular cave on Mendip for novice parties. What it lacks in length or depth is adequately compensated for by its sporty squeezes and narrow crawls. Despite its popularity, many calcite formations still remain intact in the farthest reaches of the cave.

== See also ==
- Caves of the Mendip Hills
