= Wraxall Camp =

Small earthwork in Somerset

- England
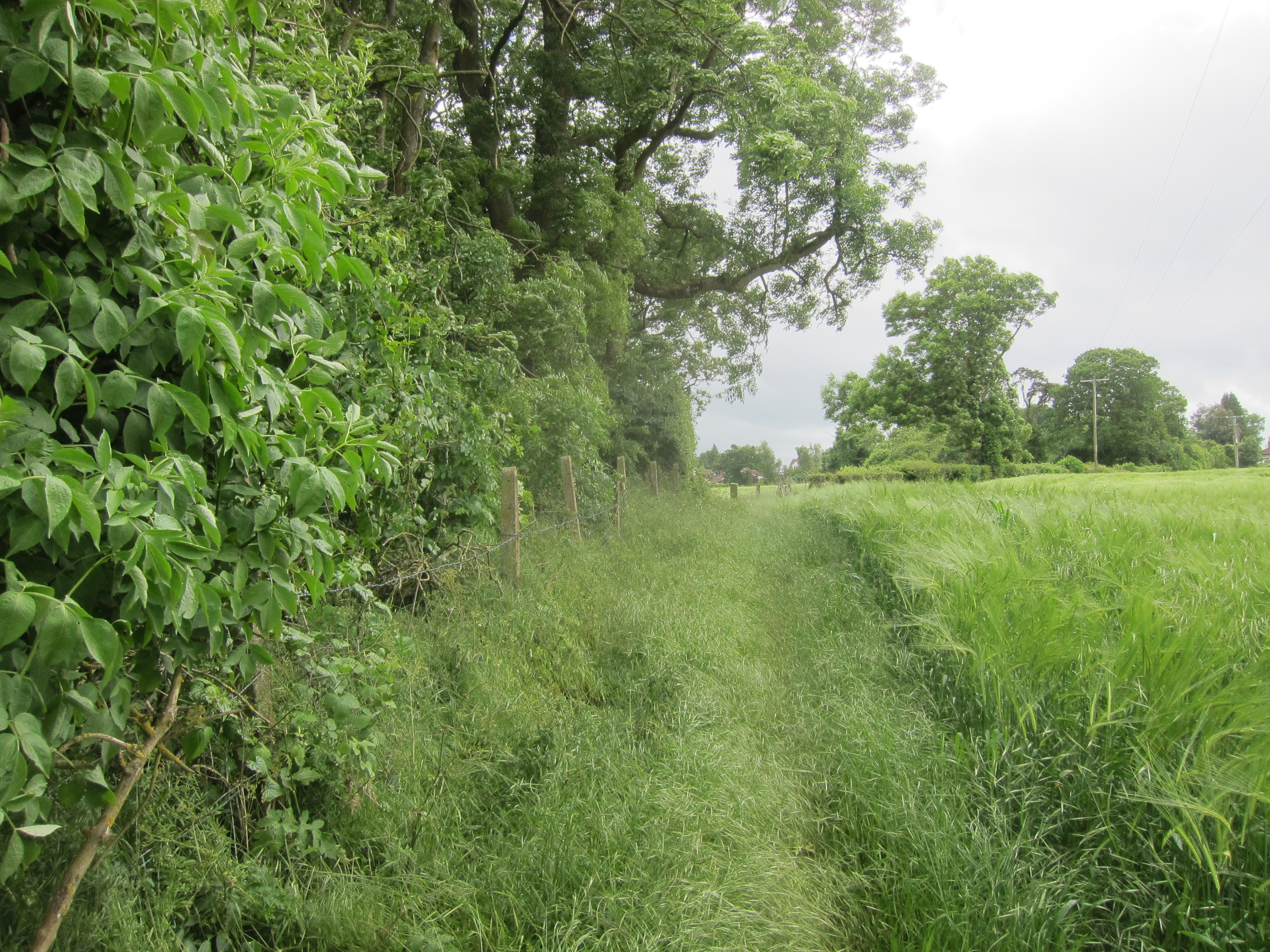
- Looking south. Woods of Wraxall Camp to the left.

Site information
- Type: Earthwork
- Condition: Overgrown

Location
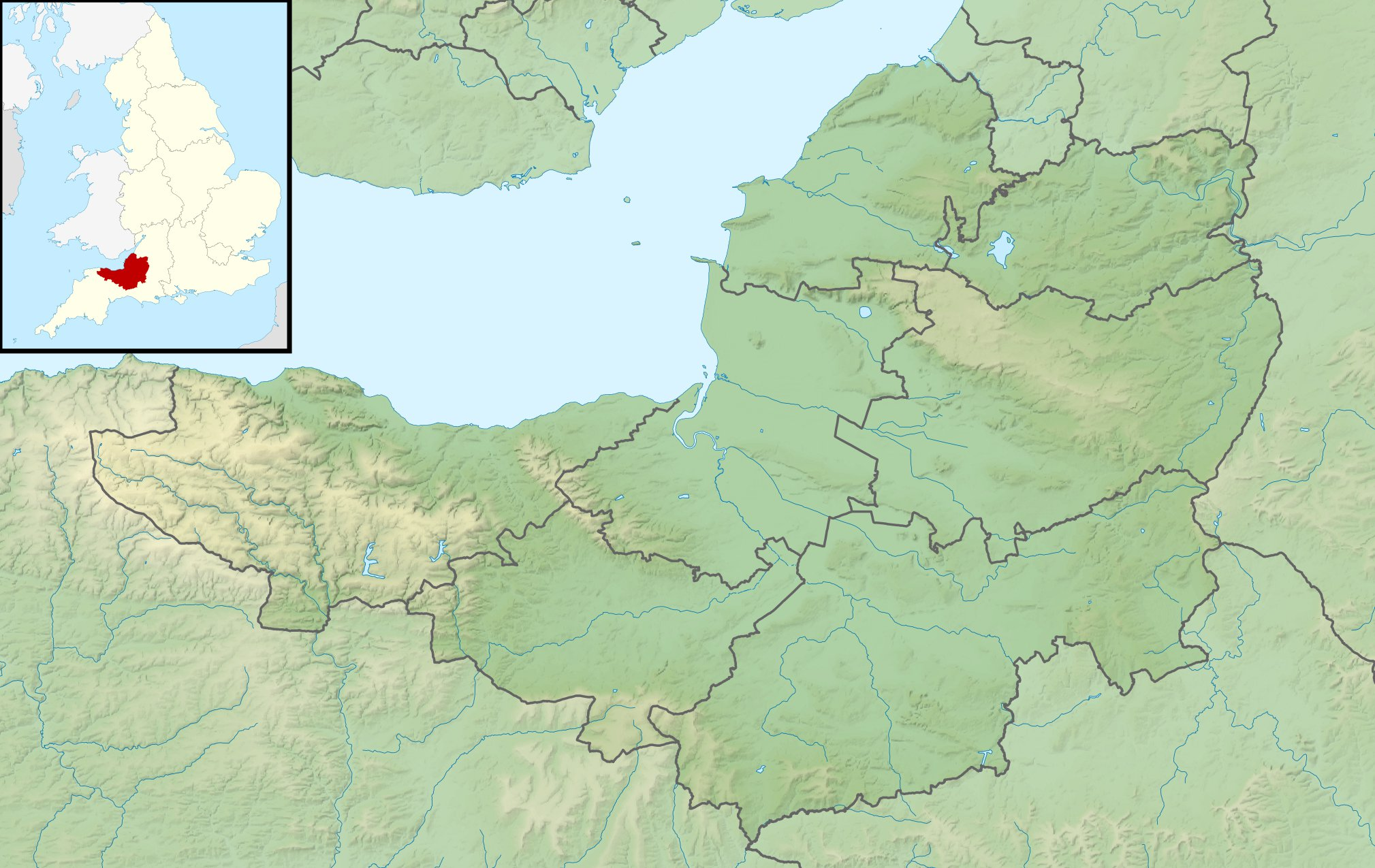
- Location in Somerset
- Coordinates: 51.444319°N 2.691328°W

Site history
- Materials: Earth

Wraxall Camp, or Failand Camp, is a small round earthwork in Somerset. The remains are indistinct and thickly covered by woods, but it appears to have been an Iron Age farmstead, and not a defensive structure.

== Location ==
Wraxall Camp is a scheduled monument in the parish of Wraxall and Failand in North Somerset, in an upland region of carboniferous limestone. The site is 1.5 miles (2.4 km) east of Wraxall village and 100 metres (330 ft) north of Failand village. It is an Iron Age settlement with a raised oval interior about 40 metres (130 ft) wide on the long axis. There may be traces of ancient agriculture between the camp and Manor Farm to the north, and the earthwork may be connected with the remains of a field system south and southwest of Manor Farm.

Partial excavations in 1928 found sherds of black burnished pottery and a Kimmeridge shale bracelet, typical of rural settlements in the Iron Age. The finds, placed in the University of Bristol Spelæological Society Museum in Bristol, were destroyed by bombing in World War II (1939–45). Many worked flints have been found in the fields around the camp. The site is thickly covered in trees.

== Structure ==
From its location on relatively high but level ground the camp seems most likely to have been a farmstead, and not defensive. Minor earthworks mark the homes in the interior, which were surrounded by a bank and ditch. The bank, up to 8 metres (26 ft) wide, was made of earth and small stones over natural rock outcrops. It is now no more than 1 metre (3 ft 3 in) high. Where the ditch can still be detected to the south and west it was 8 metres (26 ft) wide. There may be an entrance in the southwest of the enclosure.

== Sources ==
- Wraxall Camp, Historic England
- "Wraxall Camp", Megalithic Portal
