= Rod's Pot =

Cave in Somerset, England

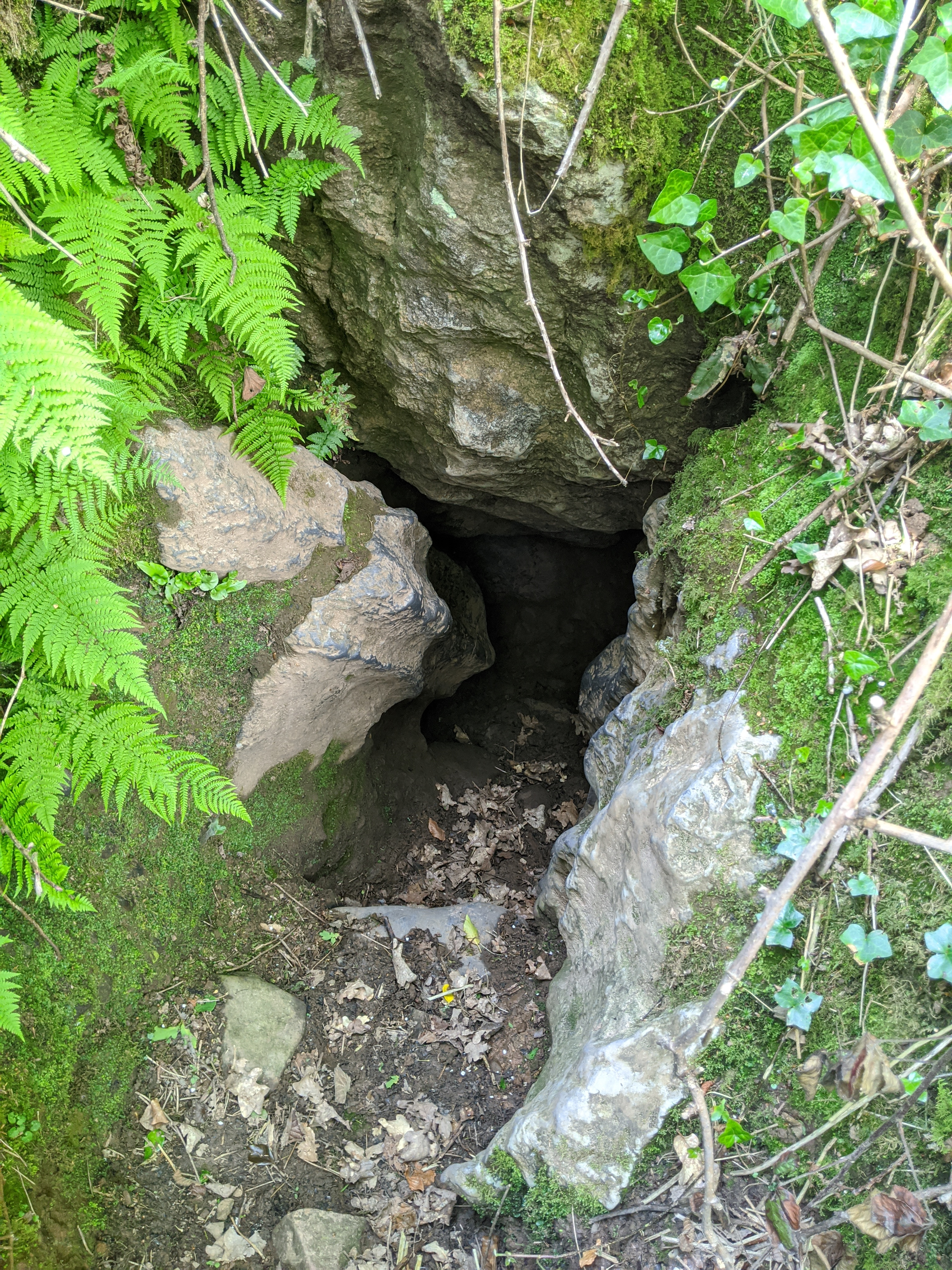
- Rod's Pot entrance

- Location within Somerset
- Location: Burrington Combe, Somerset, UK
- OS grid: ST 47215845
- Coordinates: 51°19′22″N 2°45′32″W
- Depth: 45 metres (148 ft)
- Length: 188 metres (617 ft)
- Geology: Limestone
- Entrances: 2 (Bath Swallet)
- Access: Free
- Registry: Mendip Cave Registry

Rod's Pot is a limestone cave above Burrington Combe in the Mendip Hills, in Somerset, England.

The cave was first excavated in 1944 by the University of Bristol Spelæological Society. It is one of a line of swallets marking the junction of the Limestone shales with the Carboniferous Limestones where water running off the Old Red Sandstone of Blackdown finds its way underground. Further excavation has now linked Rod's Pot to nearby Bath Swallet.

The cave was originally known as Pearce's Pot after Rodney Pearce.

== Main features ==
Rod's Pot is formed mainly of vertical rift passages, probably in the original joints in the limestone which have been enlarged by water action. The north wall of the main chamber is a continuation of the main chamber in Read's Cave, a quarter mile to the west.

The entry chamber divides into two passages about 30 feet (9.1 m) high and 40 feet (12 m) long. They merge again at the top of a 50-foot (15 m) deep vertical pothole which is a dead end. From the top of the pothole a 30-foot (9.1 m) long passage leads to the roof of the main chamber. The main chamber is about 70 feet (21 m) long, 20 feet (6.1 m) high and slopes down some 40 feet (12 m). It contains a stalagmite pillar formation and several stalactite curtains.

A small hole leads to a smaller chamber about 2 feet (0.61 m) high in which is a stalactite curtain about 8 feet (2.4 m) long and which is translucent and coloured with stripes of reddish-brown deposits. A further passageway leads to the terminal pothole.

At the base of the Bear Pit, a 3 metre deep chamber reached through a small hole halfway through the cave, a pool containing a small community of Niphargus fontanus been found.

== See also ==
- Caves of the Mendip Hills
