= Spanish Society of Speleology and Karst Science =

Spanish national caving organization

- "SedecK - Sociedad Española de Espeleología y Ciencias del Karst"
- Abbreviation: (SedecK)
- Formation: 1998; 28 years ago
- Type: INGO
- Purpose: to promote and disseminate science of speleology and karst
- Headquarters: Gómez Pardo Foundation, Alenza Street nº 1, Madrid, CP 28003
- Region served: Spain
- Members: 142 Members (1998)
- Official language: Spanish
- President: Martin Garay Policarp
- Publication: SEDECK, ISSN 1696-1897
- Website: www.sedeck.org

The Spanish Society of Speleology and Karst Science (Sociedad Española de Espeleología y Ciencias del Karst, SedecK) is a national caving organization of Spanish caving clubs to promote and disseminate the science of speleology and karst, founded in 1998.

== Purpose ==
The Spanish Society of Speleology and Karst Science (SedecK) was founded in 1998 in Madrid as a national caving organization of Spanish caving clubs to promote and disseminate science of speleology and karst in general and scientific studies about the conservation of caves and their natural contents in particular. It aims to facilitate scientific communications about karst and dialogue with administrations managing this environment.

== Activities ==
SedecK organizes and participates in seminars, symposia and conferences related to speleological sciences. It promotes the distribution of scientific publications on all aspects of karst, and collaborates with other Spanish and international associations furthering the development of speleology and karst. It has been organizing an annual meeting each year since 1999.

== Publications ==
The Association publishes a monthly journal called SEDECK on its website, also known as Boletín de las Sociedad Española de Espeleología y Ciencias del Karst.

Its articles have been cited in scientific books as for example in the 2005 book "Caracterización microclimática de cavidades y análisis de la influencia antrópica de su uso turístico", the 2006 book "Geotourism" by David Newsome (2003), the 2010 book "The Acheulian site of Gesher Benot Ya'aqov", the 2013 book "Space and Time in Mediterranean Prehistory", or the 2014 books "Hydrogeological and environmental investigations in Karst systems" and "Technical systems of lithic production in the lower and middle Pleistocene of the Iberian Peninsula". SEDECK articles have been cited also in other scientific journals, such as the Journal of Anthropological Research.

== Collaborations ==
SedecK works with the following caving clubs

- Andalusian Federation of Speleology
- Speleological Group Edelweiss
- Federació Catalana d'Espeleología
- Caving Club Muntanyenc Barcelonès
- Castilian-Manchego Federation of Speleology and Canyons
- Higher Technical School of Engineers of Mines and Energy

== Affiliations ==
SedecK is associated with the

- Cántabrian Association for the Defense of Underground Heritage
- Speleological Group Abyss
- Aragón Speleology Center
- SIDMAR, Oceanographic Studies and Services, SL
- Catalan Institute of Speleology and Karst Science, Icek,
- Club Deportivo Elemental Minas Espeleo
