= Pollnagollum =

Cave in County Clare, Ireland

Pollnagollum–Poulelva
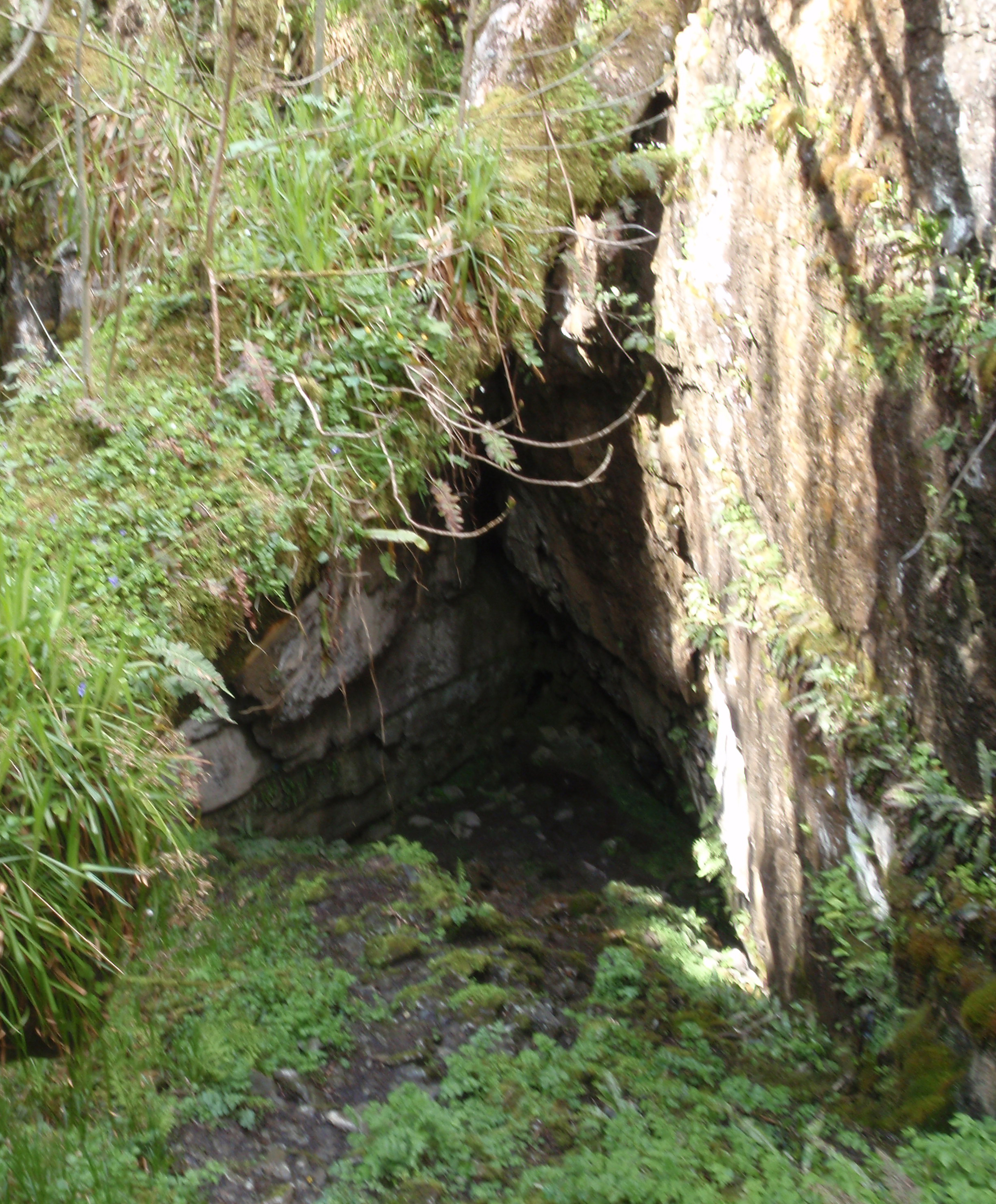
- Pollnagollum entrance pothole

- Location within Ireland
- Location: The Burren, County Clare, Ireland
- Coordinates: 53°04′38″N 9°15′05″W
- Depth: 140 m (460 ft)
- Length: Approx. 16 km (9.9 mi)
- Geology: Limestone
- Entrances: 8
- Entrances list: Pollnagollum; Poulelva; Pollbinn
- Translation: Cave of the Pigeons
- Pronunciation: Powl-nah-gollum
- Associated caves: Bullock Pot

Pollnagollum–Poulelva (usually referred to as Pollnagollum or Poulnagollum) is an active stream passage cave situated in County Clare, Ireland.

== Description ==
At over 16 kilometres (9.9 mi) in length, Pollnagollum is the longest cave on the island of Ireland and the third deepest cave in the State. The system primarily consists of winding stream passages which interconnect in various ways, offering a great variety of through trips. The cave is usually entered via the Pollnagollum entrance, with the main streamway encountered a short distance inside.

The main streamway continues for most of the length of the cave with several smaller inlets entering along its length. Near the southern end of the cave the 30-metre (98 ft) Poulelva pot is encountered; the two entrances are often used for through-trips. Much of the water in the cave is fed from the sinks of Upper Pollnagollum, at the point where surface water runs off the shale bedrock and sinks into the permeable limestone. The terminus of the cave is a low bedding plane which eventually becomes too low to progress. The water resurges at the Killaney rising to the south of the cave.

== History ==
The first known exploration of the cave was by T. J. Westropp in 1880, venturing as far as the Main Junction, but it was not until the 20th century that serious exploration began. E. A. Baker undertook the first systematic exploration of the cave in 1912 and returned in 1925. During the 1925 trip, Baker carried out a partial survey. In 1935 the Yorkshire Ramblers' Club recorded the first descent of Poulelva. In 1944 the Royal Irish Academy published a major survey and article by J. C. Coleman and N. J. Dunnington.

In 1952 cavers from the RAF discovered Branch Passage Gallery and in 1953 they connected it to the rest of the cave. A full survey was carried out in the 1960s by the University of Bristol Spelaeological Society, by which time 10 kilometres (6.2 mi) of cave had been discovered. The survey has been kept up to date by the society as cavers continue to add to its length to this day. Pollnagollum is one of the most popular and most visited caves in the country for cavers, and is often done as a beginners' trip.
