= Tree diagram =

Tree diagram may refer to:

- Tree structure, a way of representing the hierarchical nature of a structure in a graphical form

== Mathematics and logic ==
- Tree diagram (probability theory), a diagram to represent a probability space in probability theory
- Decision tree, a decision support tool that uses a tree-like graph or model of decisions and their possible consequences
- Event tree, inductive analytical diagram in which an event is analyzed using Boolean logic
- Game tree, a tree diagram used to find and analyze potential moves in a game

== Linguistics ==
- Language tree, representation of a group of languages related through descent from a common ancestor
- Parse tree, a representation of the syntactic structure of a string according to some formal grammar in linguistics
  - Sentence diagram, a pictorial representation of the grammatical structure of a sentence showing the relationships of phrase structures

== Biology ==
- Dendrogram, a tree diagram used to illustrate clusters of genes or samples in computational biology
- Phylogenetic tree, a branching diagram showing the inferred evolutionary relationships among various biological species

== Other uses ==
- Attack tree, conceptual diagrams showing how a target might be attacked
- Fault tree diagram, diagram used in deductive failure analysis in various industries
- Program structure tree, hierarchical diagram that displays the organization of a computer program
- Treemapping, a method for displaying hierarchical data using nested figures, usually rectangles.

== See also ==
- Tree topology, a topology based on a hierarchy of nodes in a computer network
- Tree diagram (physics), an acyclic Feynman diagram, pictorial representations of the mathematical expressions governing the behavior of subatomic particles
- Outliners, a common software application that is used to generate tree diagrams
- Network diagram
- Tree (disambiguation)
- Descent (disambiguation)
