= Speleo club du liban =

Caving club in Lebanon

Spéléo Club du Liban النادي اللبناني للتنقيب في المغاور
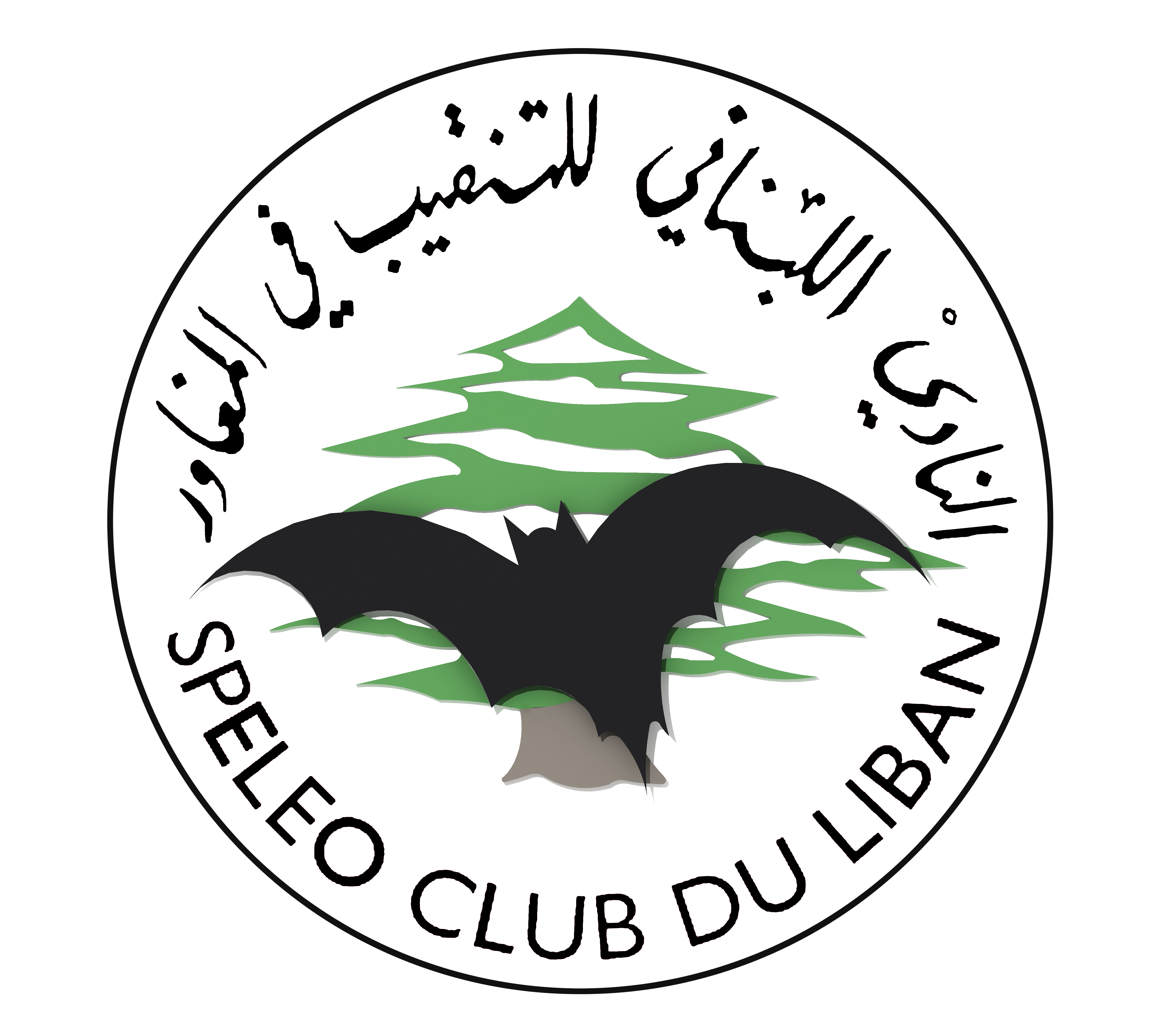
- Abbreviation: SCL
- Formation: 1951
- Founder: Lionel Ghorra; Albert Anavy; Sami Karkabi; Raymond Khawam
- Purpose: Caving club
- Headquarters: Matn, Mount Lebanon
- Location: Lebanon
- Coordinates: 33.893958°N 35.614738°E
- Region served: Lebanon
- President: Johnny Tawk
- Vice President: Chadi Chaker
- Treasurer: Joey Abou Jaoudeh
- Secretary General: Patrick Lteif
- Affiliations: International Union of Speleology
- Website: speleoliban.org
- Contact: 00961-71-727929

Spéléo Club du Liban ("Lebanon's Caving Club") was formed in 1951. It is the oldest caving association in the Middle East.

== History ==
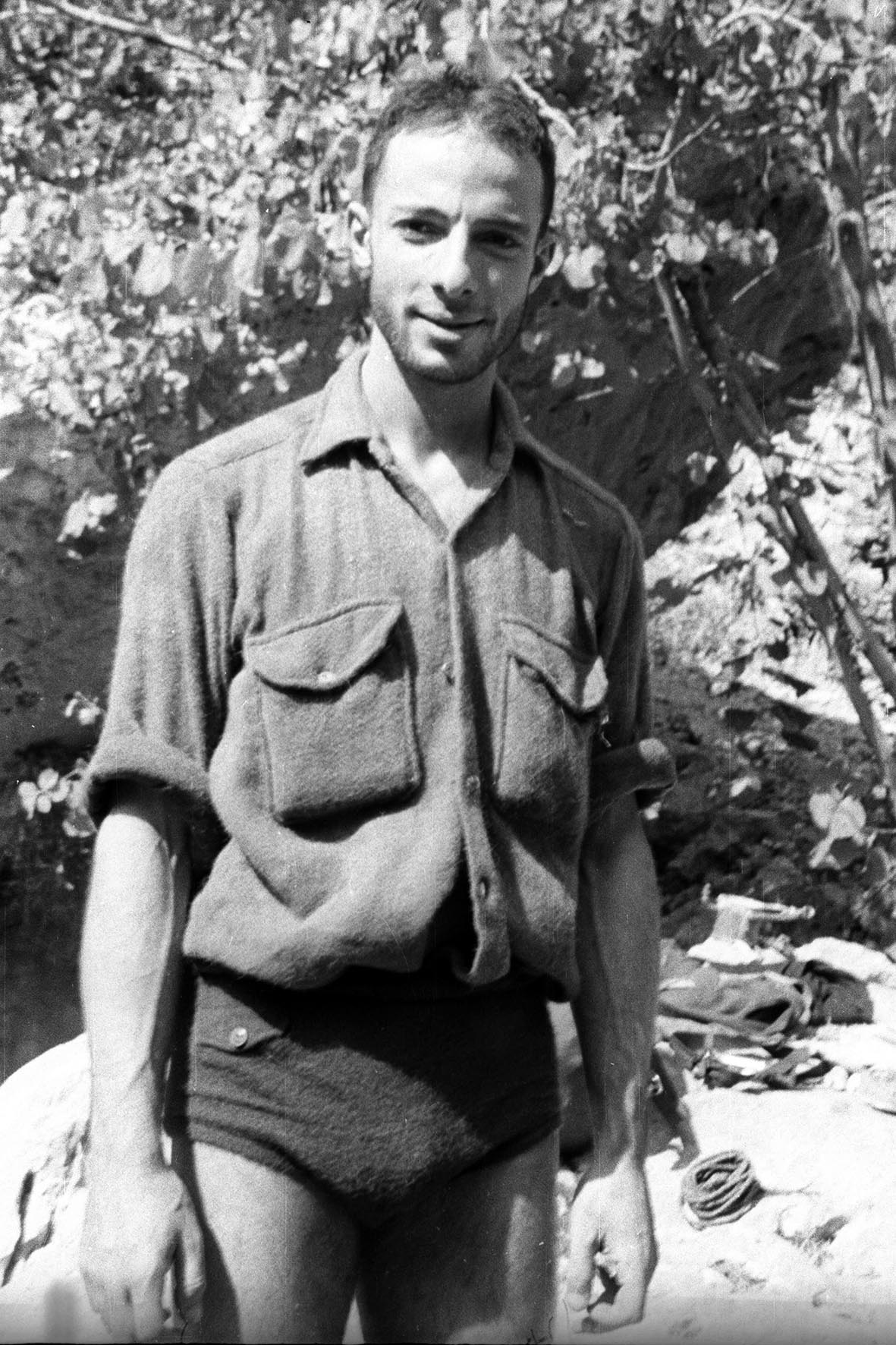
Sami Karkabi

In 1940, Lionel Ghorra escorted a French expedition to the Jeita Cave. Ghorra was passionate about the discipline and he led as of 1946 a group of friends who went further into the Jeita cave. Documents about the discipline were gathered, contacts with foreign caving entities were established, and the idea of putting together a collective and organized structure was taking shape. Born in 1951, the Speleo-Club of Lebanon was only officially registered six years later in 1957. The club’s founding fathers were the cavers Lionel Ghorra, Sami Karkabi, Raymond Khawam, and Albert Anavy.

The discoveries made in Jeita led to its opening to the public as a tourist show-cave, with Sami Karkabi as its director. The club was officially recognized as beneficial to the nation (d’Utilité Publique) in 1963. Two years later in 1965, the SCL, representing Lebanon, became a founding member of the International Union of Speleology (UIS). At this event, Albert Anavy was also elected as the first General Secretary of the UIS.

Throughout the years, SCL cavers made discoveries and studies, attempted underground dives, improved equipment by DIY innovations. SCL is regularly asked to train the Lebanese army in cave rescue operations and in single rope technique. In addition it is also requested to conduct underground studies for various organizations such as governmental bodies, municipalities, and even consultancy firms.

SCL releases periodically Al Ouat’Ouate (the bat in Arabic), the club’s magazine since 1955. Consistent, with club activities, the Ouat’Ouate covers all aspects of speleology.

The SCL was the initiator of the first National Gathering of Speleology in 1996, and the main organizer of the Middle-East Speleology Symposium MESS in 2001. SCL moved also organized MESS2 in 2006, thus committing itself to organize such an event every five years.

== Awards and recognition ==
The club was awarded the 'A Club that is a Benefit to the Public' Order by the Lebanese government in 1963. The SCL was decorated with the National Order of the Cedar, with the rank of Knight, by the President of the Republic in 1969.

SCL’s continuous progress and achievements was last officially rewarded by being granted the National order of the Cedar a second time, with the grade of Officer.

== Community service ==
In 2007, authorities called on the Speleo Club du Liban to help control a fire at Deir al-Qamar, praising the spelunkers turned firefighters: "The youth really helped the firemen, who were not able to do all the work themselves."
