= J. C. Coleman =

Irish speleologist, archaeologist and geographer

- Born: John Cristopher Coleman; 1914; Cork, Ireland
- Died: 20 April 1971 (aged 57)
- Occupations: Geographer, archaeologist, speleologist, mountaineer
- Known for: Founding the Speleological Society of Ireland
- Children: 4

John Cristopher "Jack" Coleman (1914–1971) was a respected Irish geographer, archaeologist, speleologist and mountaineer. He devoted much of his life to the study of the caves of Ireland, the product of which were his many contributions to scientific journals in Ireland and the United Kingdom, his founding of the Speleological Society of Ireland and the publishing of his book, The Caves of Ireland.

Through his extensive exploration of Irish caves and nationally and internationally published articles, Coleman played an instrumental role in advancing the study of speleology in Ireland during the mid-to-late 20th century. He is called the "father of Irish caving" due to his life's work.

== Life and caving exploits ==
Coleman was born in Cork, and worked for Bord Fáilte from 1945, having trained as a geographer at Cork University.

He began caving in 1932, initially exploring caves within cycling distance of his home in Cork City such as Carrigtwohill Caves and Ovens Caves (where he found weapons left over from the Civil War).

In 1940 Coleman met Portlaoise textile chemist N. J. Dunnington, who joined him in explorations of caves in South Cork. In July 1941 the pair cycled heavily laden bicycles to County Clare to investigate Pollnagollum, and over the ensuing years undertook a systematic exploration of the cave system. In 1944 the Royal Irish Academy published an article on the cave system by Coleman and Dunnington, which received widespread praise from the scientific community and attracted a new wave of speleologists to the Burren.

Coleman was the first speleologist to identify scalloping as an indicator of the direction of water flow in a cave. His findings, made between 1946 and 1949, were published by the University of Bristol Spelæological Society (UBSS). Coleman would later cite the relationship that he built with the society over the following years to be a major stimulus in continuing his work on Irish caves, and ultimately in completing his book on the subject. By the 1960s he had been made Honorary Life Member of the UBSS.

Throughout the 1950s Coleman carried out much scientific fieldwork in areas such as Counties Sligo, Monaghan and Kerry, and the Cong region, which would pave the way for further discoveries by local and visiting speleologists.

In 1964 Coleman founded the Speleological Society of Ireland, the first representative body for cavers in Ireland. He was also the first editor of the Society's journal Irish Speleology. Coleman published his work widely in a number of publications. His articles included work on Dunmore Cave, Carrigtwohill Caves and Pollnagollum, but it was not until 1965 that his seminal work, The Caves of Ireland, was published. Originally written by Coleman as his MA thesis at Cork University, the book was the first and currently only publication to comprehensively list and describe cave sites throughout Ireland.

Coleman was also a prominent member of the Irish Mountaineering Club and was president of the club from 1950 to 1953.

Coleman was killed in a car accident on 20 April 1971, at the age of 57. He was survived by his wife, son and three daughters.

== List of publications ==
=== Books ===
- — (1948). The Mountains of Killarney. Dundalk, Co. Louth: Dundalgan Press.
- — (1950). Journeys into Muskerry. Dundalk, Co. Louth: Dundalgan Press.
- Coleman, J. C., ed. (1954). Official Guide: Clare. Dublin.
- — (1965). The Caves of Ireland. Tralee, Co. Kerry: Anvil Press.

=== Articles ===
- Coleman, J. C. (1938). "The kitchen middens of Cork Harbour". Journal of the Cork Historical and Archaeological Society. 2. XLIII: 39–44.
- — (1940). "The Ovens Cave, Co. Cork". Journal of the Cork Historical and Archaeological Society. 2. XLV: 47–52.
- — (1941). "Exploration of Carrigacrump caves, Co. Cork". Journal of the Cork Historical and Archaeological Society. 2. XLVI: 16–24.
- — (1942). "Cave excavation at Midleton, Co. Cork". Journal of the Cork Historical and Archaeological Society. 2. XLVII: 63–76.
- — (2 May 1942). "Walking under County Clare". The Times Pictorial. p. 3.
- — (September 1943). "Underground drainage in County Cork". Irish Naturalists' Journal. VIII (4): 124–128.
- — (1944). "Excavations in Ovens Cave, Co. Cork". Journal of the Cork Historical and Archaeological Society. 2. XLIX: 58–59.
- — (1944). "The craft of coopering". Journal of the Cork Historical and Archaeological Society. 2. XLIX: 79–89.
- — (1944). "Cave excavations, Co. Cork". Journal of the Royal Society of Antiquaries of Ireland. 7. XIV: 228.
- — (1944). "Poulnagollum [letter to editor]". British Caver. 12: 67–68.
- —; Dunnington, N. J. (October 1944). "The Poulnagollum cave, Co. Clare". Proceedings of the Royal Irish Academy. L (B): 105–132.
- — (1945). "The caves of Imokilly barony". Journal of the Cork Historical and Archaeological Society. 2. L: 6–9.
- — (1945). "'Kitchen midden' near Douglas, Co. Cork". Journal of the Cork Historical and Archaeological Society. 2. L: 62–63.
- — (1945). "An indicator of waterflow in caves". Geological Magazine. 82 (3). Cambridge University Press: 138–139. Bibcode:1945GeoM...82..138C. doi:10.1017/S0016756800078134.
- — (1945). "Souterrain near Bealnamorrive, Co. Cork". Journal of the Royal Society of Antiquaries of Ireland. 7. XV: 112–114.
- — (1945). "Preliminary note on an indicator of water-flow in caves". British Caver. 13: 35–36.
- — (March 1945). "Stalmotite growth in the new cave, Mitchelstown, Co. Cork". Irish Naturalists' Journal. VIII (7): 254–255.
- Coleman, J. C.; Stelfox, A.W. (September 1945). "Excavation at Carrigtwohill Caves, Co. Cork". Irish Naturalists' Journal. VIII (8): 299–302. JSTOR 25533361.
- Coleman, J. C. (1947). "Some souterrains in County Cork". Journal of the Cork Historical and Archaeological Society. 2. LII: 69–73.
- — (1947). "Irish cave excavation". The Journal of the Royal Society of Antiquaries of Ireland. 7. XVII: 63–80.
- — (1948). "Irish limestone regions and caves". Journal of the British Speleological Association. 1 (3): 87–91.
- Coleman, J. C.; Dunnington, N. J. (1948). "The Pollnagollum cave, Co. Clare, Éire". Journal of the British Speleological Association. 1 (4): 100–120.
- Coleman, J. C. (1949). "The Irish caveworld". The Capuchin Annual: 51–65.
- — (1949). "An indicator of water-flow in Caves". Proceedings of the University of Bristol Spelæological Society. 6 (1): 57–67.
- — (1949). "Irish cave pearls". Proceedings of the University of Bristol Spelæological Society. 6 (1): 68–71.
- Coleman, J. C.; Dunnington, N. J. (April 1949). "Further explorations: Pollnagollum cave, Co. Clare". Irish Naturalists' Journal. IX (10): 272–274.
- Coleman, J. C. (1950). "Caves in the Tralee district". Journal of the Cork Historical and Archaeological Society. 2. LV: 25–30.
- Dunnington, N. J.; Coleman, J. C. (1950). "Dunmore Cave, Co. Kilkenny". Proceedings of the Royal Irish Academy. 53B: 15–24. JSTOR 20490874.
- Coleman, J. C. (1950). "The Aille river and cave, Co. Mayo". Irish geography. II (2): 58–60.
- — (1952). "Caves near Carrickmacross, County Monaghan". Irish geography. II (4): 180–183.
- — (1955). "Caves in the Cong area of Galway and Mayo". Irish geography. III (2): 94–106. doi:10.1080/00750775509555493.
- — (March 1965). "The names of Irish caves". British Caver. 42: 70–72.
- Coleman, J. C.; Williams, P. W. (1965). "Coole Cave, Co. Galway, Ireland". Proceedings of the University of Bristol Spelæological Society. 10 (3): 299–304.
- Coleman, J. C. (1966). "Flooding in the Lisdoonvarna Area, County Clare". Irish Speleology. 1 (2): 32.
- — (1966). "Sinks and risings near Quin, County Clare". Irish Speleology. 1 (3): 20.
- — (1969). "Some marine and lacustrine karst features in Ireland". Proceedings of the 5th International Congress of Speleology. 1. Stuttgart, Germany: M4/1–M4/6.
- — (1969). "Part-natural caves in Ireland". Proceedings of the 5th International Congress of Speleology. 2. Stuttgart, Germany: S18/1–S18/4.
- — (1969). "The society in Ireland". Proceedings of the University of Bristol Spelæological Society. 12 (1): 75–82.

== See also ==
- Caving
- Category:Caves of Ireland
