= Genova (2008 film) =

- Theatrical release poster
- Directed by: Michael Winterbottom
- Written by: Laurence Coriat; Michael Winterbottom
- Produced by: Andrew Eaton
- Starring: Colin Firth; Catherine Keener; Willa Holland; Perla Haney-Jardine; Hope Davis
- Cinematography: Marcel Zyskind
- Edited by: Paul Monaghan
- Music by: Melissa Parmenter
- Production company: Revolution Films
- Distributed by: Metrodome Distribution
- Release dates: 7 September 2008 (TIFF); 27 March 2009 (United Kingdom)
- Running time: 94 minutes
- Country: United Kingdom
- Language: English

Genova (released in the US as A Summer in Genoa) is a 2008 drama film co-written and directed by Michael Winterbottom and starring Colin Firth, Catherine Keener, and Hope Davis. It was filmed in the titular city of Genoa (Genova in Italian) during the summer of 2007. It premiered at the 2008 Toronto International Film Festival and won the best director's award at the San Sebastián International Film Festival.

== Plot ==
Following the death of his wife, Marianne, in a car accident, Joe, a university lecturer, decides to teach English Literature at a university in Genova, Italy. Joe is accompanied by his two daughters, 16-year-old Kelly and 10-year-old Mary. The trio occupies a flat in the crowded Genova streets and soon adapt to the local way of life, taking day trips to the beach and hiring an Italian tutor in piano playing.

Kelly falls in love with local Italian teenage boy and begins dating him, without her father's knowledge. Mary remains close to her father and still deals with painful memories of her mother's death. Mary was directly responsible for the accident and remains haunted by her image.

Joe, while enjoying life in Genova, has to deal with the demands of being a single parent while also balancing his re-emergent love life. One romantic interest is Barbara, a colleague at the university with whom he shared a brief romantic relationship back at Harvard when both were students. Barbara tries to get close to the family, helping with translation and their day-to-day needs in Genova, but beginning to intrude in their private lives. Another romantic interest is a young Italian student in Joe's literature class. She is brash and idealistic and quickly makes her intentions known to the professor.

Joe makes a lunch date with the Italian student, spurning the much older Barbara. Kelly gets into a fight with her Italian boyfriend and is forced to hitch a ride home from the beach. Meanwhile, Mary is left to walk home alone due to Kelly's tardiness and instead follows an apparition of her late mother across a busy intersection, causing another car crash and almost getting killed. The movie ends with the two daughters beginning their studies at a local Italian secondary school, eager to start a new chapter as a family in Genova.

== Cast ==
- Colin Firth as Joe
- Catherine Keener as Barbara
- Hope Davis as Marianne
- Willa Holland as Kelly
- Perla Haney-Jardine as Mary
- Kyle Griffin as Scott
- Kerry Shale as Stephen
- Gherardo Crucitti as Mauro
- Margherita Romeo as Rosa
- Gary Wilmes as Danny
- Demetri Goritsas as Demetri
- Alessandro Giuggioli as Lorenzo

== Production ==
Andrew Eaton produced the film and suggested that it reflected Michael Winterbottom's family life in the same way that Winterbottom's ex-wife, Sabrina Broadbent, had documented their family life in her novel Descent: An Irresistible Tragicomedy of Everyday Life.

== Music ==
The theme used for the opening credits is the Le Grand Choral by Georges Delerue, first used in La Nuit Americaine. Étude No. 3 (Tristesse) by Chopin recurs throughout.

== Reception ==
Genova was generally well received. As of June 2020, the film holds a 77% approval rating on Rotten Tomatoes, based on 44 reviews with an average rating of 6.24/10. The website's critics consensus reads: "Michael Winterbottom's tale of grief and mourning, though frustrating in places, is intelligent filmmaking with superb central performances." The film was released direct to DVD in the United States in April 2011, immediately after Firth's Oscar win, under the alternate title A Summer in Genoa.
