= Mendip Cave Registry and Archive =

The Mendip Cave Registry and Archive (MCRA) has the object of recording and indexing all available information on caves, mines, rock shelters and other sites of speleological interest primarily in the area of Bristol, Somerset, Bath and Wiltshire in South West England.

== History ==
The MCRA was formed as the Mendip Cave Registry in January 1956.

In 1969 the Registry ceased to function but it was revived in 1994 by Dave Irwin. In 2007 it was decided to expand the Registry to include archive material and the name was amended to Mendip Cave Registry and Archive.

== Publications ==
- Taviner, Rob 'Tav'. Is That So?. MCRA. p. 172. ISBN 978-0-9531310-2-0.

== Related ==
There are also some established cave registers for other parts of the United Kingdom. These are:

- Mendip cave registry (already mentioned)
- Welsh Cave Register operated by the Cambrian Caving Council established in the 1960s.
- The Caves of Scotland presented in the form of a comprehensive one-page bibliography
- Southern Ireland Cave Bibliography operated by UBSS
- The Derbyshire Cave Registry, which doesn't have a web presence, but was established in 1970.
- The authoritative cave catalogue in Yorkshire has historically been the Northern Caves volumes. but more recently cave survey data has been submitted to BCA cave survey database

=== International ===
Government organized national cave registries are common in countries where such karst features is relevant to infrastructure projects, such as water supply and road building.

- Austria - The Austrian cave directory is jointly organized by Verband Osterreichischer Hohlenforscher and the speleological department of the Natural History Museum in Vienna. It is organized by mountain range.
- Slovenia - The Speleological Association of Slovenia has a database of more than 10,000 caves in its Cadastre collected over 100 years.
- Australia - The Karst Index Database run by the Australian Speleological Federation contains more than 6500 features.

Further information can be found on the UIS Informatics Commission contacts page.

== See also ==
- Caving in the United Kingdom
