= Yorkshire Subterranean Society =

The Yorkshire Subterranean Society is a caving club based at Helwith Bridge near Horton in Ribblesdale in the Yorkshire Dales. The Yorkshire Subterranean Society is more commonly known as the YSS. The YSS organises regular Caving and Walking meets to the Yorkshire Dales twice a month and other UK Caving areas through the year. The YSS also organises social events and "Try Caving" or potholing weekends for people wishing to have a go at the sport. The YSS also provides single rope technique (SRT) training to its members.

== History ==
The club was founded in 1964 and celebrated its 60th anniversary in 2024 at the Flacon Manor, Settle.

The YSS was formed by a group of enthusiasts in October 1964 initially calling themselves "The Undertakers Subterranean Society". After adverse publicity, they changed their name to the Yorkshire Subterranean Society in August 1965.

== Expeditions ==
- Gouffre Berger 1986
- Gouffre Berger 1988
- Gouffre Berger 1991
- Gouffre Berger 2006
- Pierre Saint Martin 2007
- Cueto Conventosa 2007
- 2008 sees the club plan to visit BU56 otherwise known as Sima de las Puertas de Illamina

== See also ==
- Caving in the United Kingdom
