= Grampian Speleological Group =

The Grampian Speleological Group is the oldest caving club in Scotland, having been founded in 1961. It is also the largest, with members exploring caves across Britain and the world.

== See also ==
- Caving in the United Kingdom
