= Goatchurch Cavern =

Limestone cave in Somerset, England

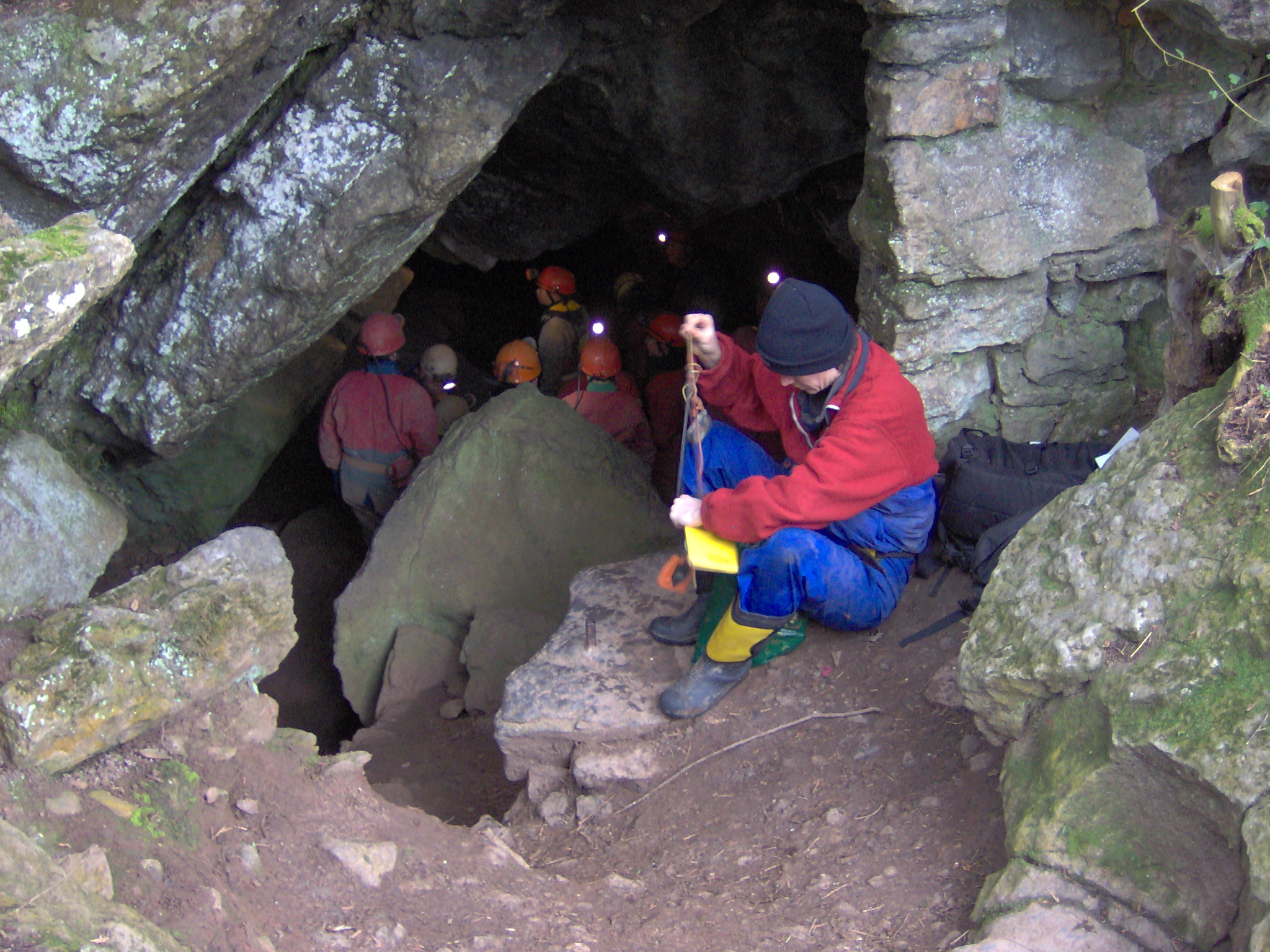
- View into main entrance with a group of school children

- Location within Somerset
- Location: Burrington Combe
- OS grid: ST 47585823
- Coordinates: 51°19′15″N 2°45′13″W
- Depth: 55 metres (180 ft)
- Length: 750 metres (2,460 ft)
- Geology: Limestone
- Entrances: 2
- Access: Free
- Cave survey: M. Rennie 1959
- BRAC grade: DC
- Registry: Mendip Cave Registry

Goatchurch Cavern is a cave on the edge of Burrington Combe in the limestone of the Mendip Hills, in Somerset, England.

== Description ==
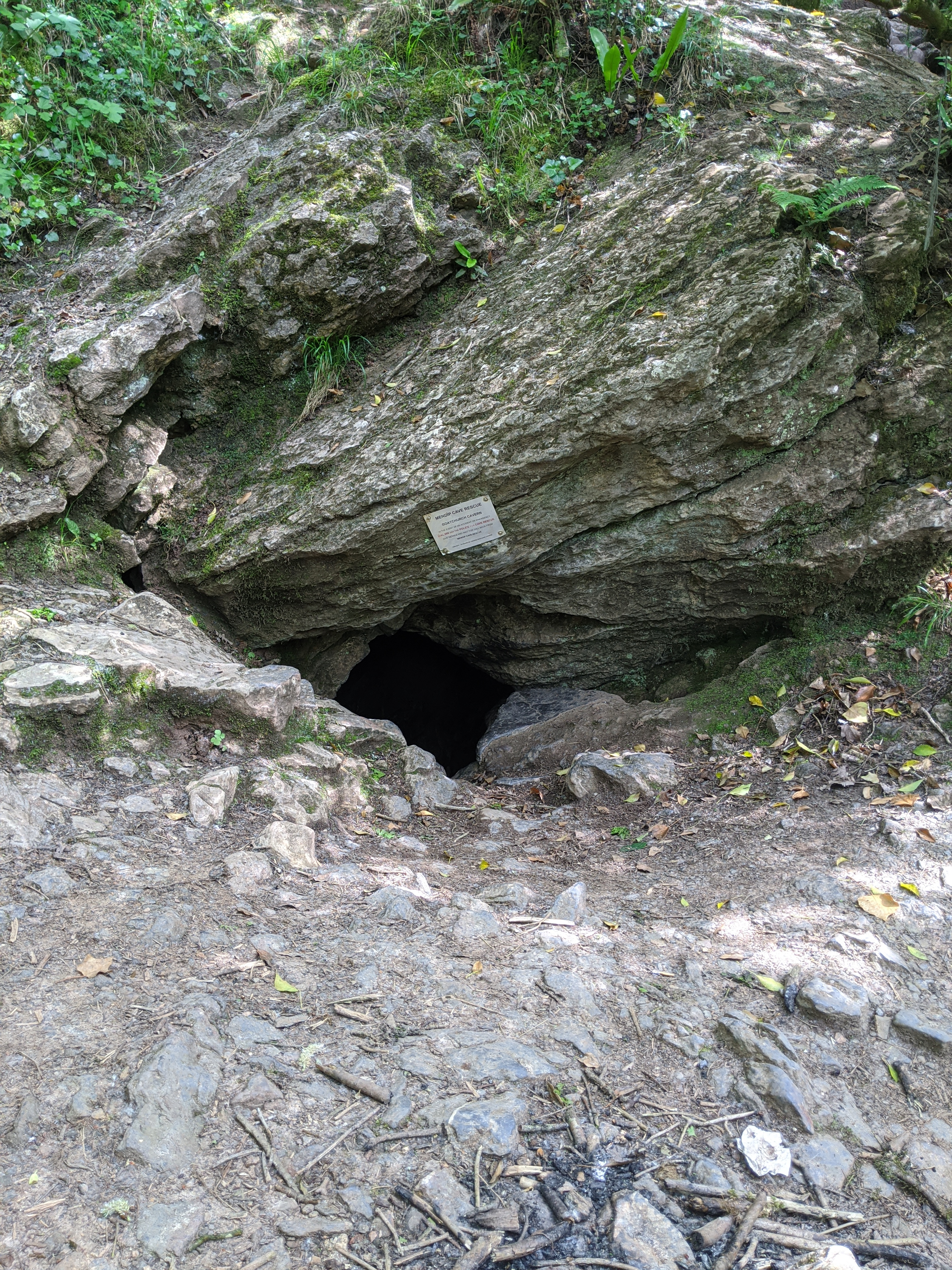
Tradesman's Entrance - second smaller entrance to the cave.

Due to early attempts to turn it into a show cave, there are remains of iron handrails inside the cave and a large amount of decoration throughout the cave. Many of the surfaces within are highly polished and slippery, as a result of numbers visiting over many decades, which have also damaged the decoration.

The cave is especially popular for training people who are new to caving. This is due to its easy access and wide range of experiences that do not necessitate the use of special equipment such as ropes or ladders.

The two entrances to the cave enable cavers to do a through trip.

== History ==
The earliest written record of this cave was in 1736 when John Strachey of Sutton Court at nearby Stowey made reference to "guy Hole" or "Goechurch". In 1829 John Rutter wrote about the large cave and in 1864 William Boyd Dawkins referred to it as "The Goatchurch" although he also used the name "Goat's Hole" in 1874. It is possible that the local dialect corrupted "Guy" into "Goat" to provide the current name.

It is thought that Goatchurch Cavern was explored by lead miners in the 19th century. Around 1900 the owner unsuccessfully tried to turn it into a show cave. In 1924 UBSS dug open the second entrance.

Notes of exploration in the 1920s record finds from the Pleistocene period including bones of mammoth, bear, hyaena and cave lion. During November 2003 inscribed marks were noticed in Goatchurch Cavern while cleaning away graffiti. Three finely cut marks were uncovered, resembling the letter W with a patina darker than in nearby graffiti dated 1704. These have been identified as ritual protection marks, possibly dating from the period 1550 to 1750. The term 'ritual protection mark' was preferred to the description "witch marks".

== Surveys ==
The cave is historically understood to be approximately 750 metres (2,500 ft) long, although 1500 m (4900 ft) of surveyed passage has been measured (UBSS, unpublished survey, pending: 2007) and reaches a surveyed depth of 61.5 m (202 ft). It has two entrances and a complex network of predominantly dry passages terminating, for most visitors, in a thin phreatic tube known as 'The Drainpipe' or 'The Bunny Run'. This is a long tight wriggle through 30 ft (9 m) of passageway that is only practically navigable whilst travelling forwards, something that is of relevance due to the Drainpipe terminating in a small blind-ending boulder chamber; meeting another caver halfway is not a pleasant experience. Another notable feature of the cave is 'The Coffin Lid'. This is where a rock, often likened to a coffin by cavers, partially blocks the way down.

A survey was conducted within Goatchurch Cavern to investigate the effect of seasonal variations on the recorded radon concentration, from which an average summer to winter ratio of 4.79 was determined. Radiation doses to users of the caves were estimated and for occupational cavers doses of in excess of 16 mSv were found to be likely.

== See also ==
- Caves of the Mendip Hills
