= Bath Swallet =

Cave in Somerset, England

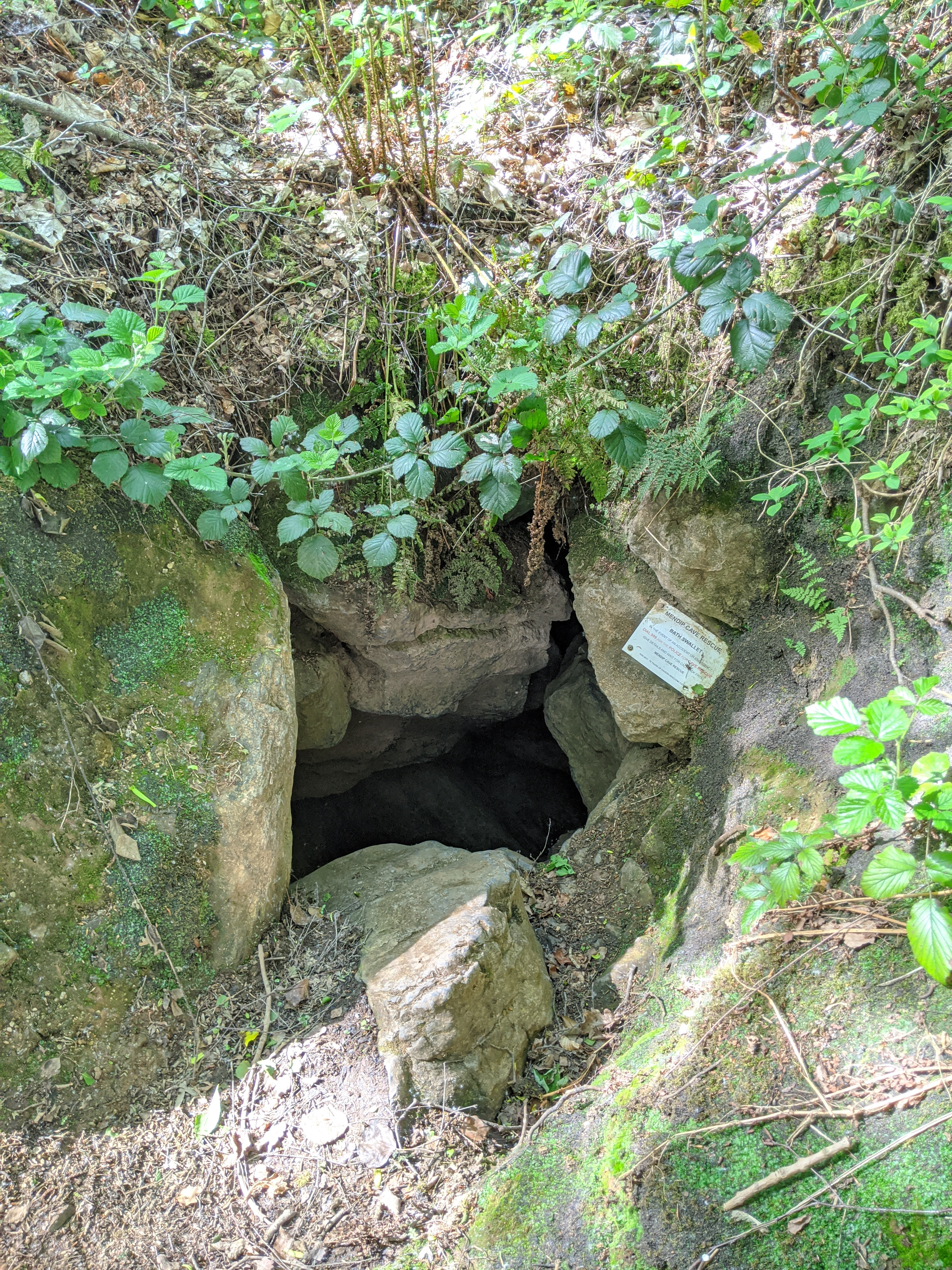
- Bath Swallet entrance

- Location within Somerset
- Location: Burrington Combe, Somerset, UK
- OS grid: ST47255845
- Coordinates: 51°19′22″N 2°45′30″W
- Depth: 37 metres (121 ft)
- Length: 76 metres (249 ft)
- Geology: Limestone
- Entrances: 2 (Rod's Pot)
- Hazards: Fall hazard
- Access: Free
- Registry: Mendip Cave Registry

Bath Swallet is a karst cave in Burrington Combe on the Mendip Hills in Somerset, England.

On Wednesday 19 September 2007 members of the Wessex Cave Club and Cheddar Caving Club succeeded in connecting Bath Swallet and Rod's Pot. It had been anticipated that the upward dig in Bath would connect with the end of 'Purple Passage' in Rod's Pot and this proved to be true. This creates what is probably Mendip's third longest through trip.

== See also ==
- Caves of the Mendip Hills
