= Circolo Speleologico Romano =

Italian speleological organization

The Circolo Speleologico Romano (CSR) is an Italian, non-profit speleological organization dedicated to the exploration, research, and conservation of caves. The CSR is one of the oldest caving groups in Italy. Its activity has contributed to the birth and the increase of the Italian Speleology

== History ==
The Circolo Speleologico Romano (CSR) was founded on the 5th of July 1904 by Guido Cora, the illustrious geographer and brave mountain climber, Baron Carlo Franchetti, Alessandro Datti and others. Immediately the CSR established relationships with other European groups, especially Swiss, French and Belgium sharing the exploration of the Abruzzo region (Luppa’s cave, Val de Varri’s Cave) and in France. The first major exploration campaigns outside Italy, of the Anatolia caves, began after the First World War leading to important biological discoveries. In this period the bio-speleological activity received a strong acceleration especially due to the two associates Patrizi and Cerruti. More than 200 new species of troglobites carry the name of CSR associates. Since the beginning of the exploration activity all the data collected about each cave has been organized in the cave cadastre. In the 90s the regional cave cadastre was passed to the Federazione speleologica del Lazio. In 1924 the club published its first bulletin, detailing the explorations and the scientific activities of its associates. This bulletin (renamed Notiziario del Circolo Speleologico Romano in 1946) is exchanged with the publications of similar organizations in more than 40 nations around the world, continually expanding the social library of the association. In 1954 for its merits in scientific field, to the fulfilment of its 50 year of activity, the CSR was named "Ente Morale" by decree of the President of the Italian Republic Luigi Einaudi. In the 1960s the CSR began to mount large international expeditions (1962 Gouffre Berger in France, 1963 in Lebanon, in 1964 Ojo Guareña in Spain and then Poland, Turkey, Albania. Since 1969 its research in Chiapas (southern Mexico) has been particularly relevant, where it has explored and surveyed more than 60 km of new caves. The bio-speleological results of these activities are published in three volumes of the Accademia Nazionale dei Lincei with the title “Subterranean Fauna of Mexico”. To commemorate the 100th year of activity of the Circolo Speleologico Romano Poste Italiane has produced a special stamp in 3.5 million of pieces.
