= Irish Cave Rescue Organisation =

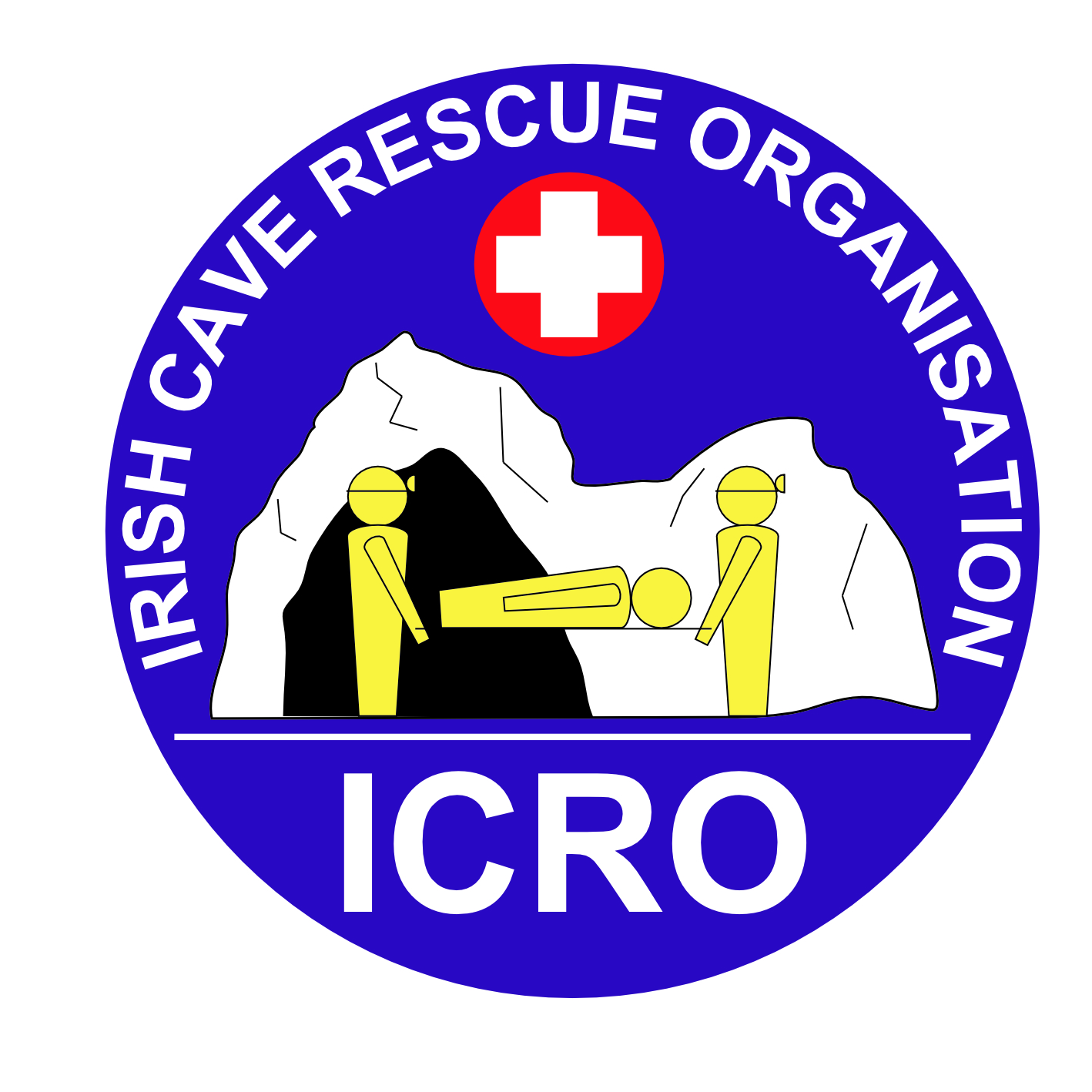
- 2024 logo

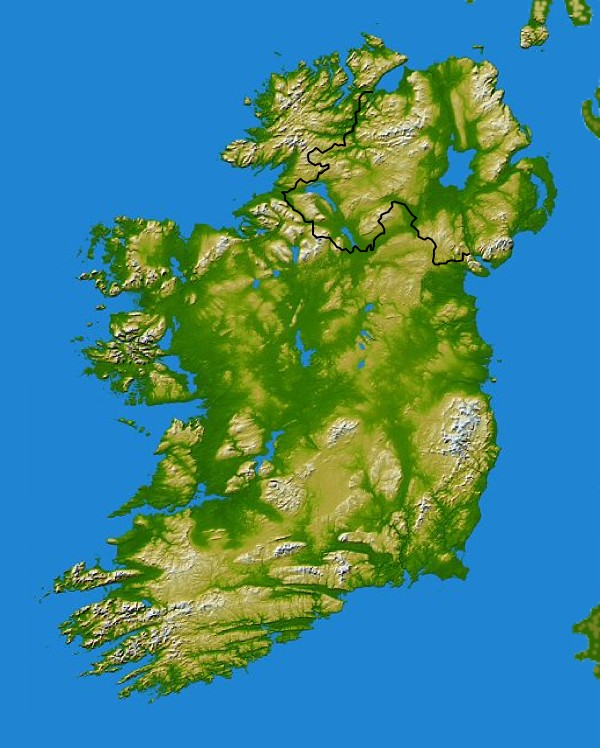
- Scope of ICRO services
- Abbreviation: ICRO
- Formation: 1961; 65 years ago
- Purpose: Cave rescue
- Region served: Northern Ireland, United Kingdom; Republic of Ireland
- Main organ: Committee
- Affiliations: Speleological Union of Ireland, British Cave Rescue Council
- Volunteers: 100
- Website: caving.ie

The Irish Cave Rescue Organisation (ICRO) is a voluntary body responsible for cave and abandoned mine rescues within the island of Ireland. The organisation attends, manages and carries out rescues at the request of the Garda Síochána in the Republic of Ireland and the Police Service of Northern Ireland (PSNI) in Northern Ireland, United Kingdom, and is responsible to both police services.

The rescue organisation has 100 members, including general members who are available to help in any situation and those who have specific skills to assist a rescue, such as first-aid training and the ability to rig a cave.

== Funding ==
The organisation was previously funded by the Northern Ireland Mountain, Cliff and Cave Rescue Coordinating Committee (through Sport Northern Ireland and the Department of Culture, Arts and Leisure) and the Irish Coast Guard.

It is now funded by the Northern Ireland Department of Justice and a member of the Northern Ireland Search & Rescue Policy Group and the Northern Ireland Search & Rescue Practitioners Group.

== Affiliations ==
ICRO is affiliated with the Speleological Union of Ireland (SUI), collectively they are known as SUICRO, as well as the British Cave Rescue Council. If needed, additional rescuers from Britain can be called in with specialised skills, such as for the recovery of Artur Kozłowski in 2011.

ICRO has representatives on the National Co-ordinating Committee for Mountain and Cave Rescue (NCCMCR) in the Republic of Ireland and the Northern Ireland Mountain Rescue Co-ordinating Committee (NIMRCC).

== Training ==
ICRO carries out major rescue training exercises throughout the year, and additional specialist training in areas such as rescue rigging, rope skills, stretcher handling, communications, wilderness first aid and casualty care. Once a year an extended overnight rescue training exercise takes place, replicating the reality and duration of a real cave rescue incident. Through the British Cave Rescue Council, ICRO has access to training in rescue techniques in Britain.

== See also ==
- Mountain Rescue Ireland
