= Descent: An Irresistible Tragicomedy of Everyday Life =

2004 novel by Sabrina Broadbent

- First edition
- Author: Sabrina Broadbent
- Language: English
- Subject: Marriage
- Genre: Autobiographical novel Roman à clef
- Published: 2004
- Publisher: Chatto & Windus
- Publication place: United Kingdom
- Media type: Print
- ISBN: 0099464527

Descent: An Irresistible Tragicomedy of Everyday Life is a 2004 roman à clef by Sabrina Broadbent about a troubled marriage. The protagonist, Genevieve, is a psychiatric nurse whose husband, a filmmaker, leaves her at home while he travels the world having sexual intercourse with well-known actresses. Descent was Broadbent's debut novel and is based on her own marriage. After Descent, her next novel was You Don't Have to be Good, which also takes romantic problems as its subject. Descent was the inaugural winner of the W H Smith Raw Talent Award. Stephen Rodrick of The New York Times called Descent "a touching, smart novel."

== Background ==
The novel is based on Broadbent's previous marriage. Broadbent had been married to Michael Winterbottom and had had two daughters with him, but the couple divorced; Andrew Eaton suggested that Winterbottom went on to reflect the family's life in fiction as well, in the film Genova, although Winterbottom denied this claim. As an autobiographical novel, Descent specifically documents the deterioration of Broadbent's marriage to Winterbottom as a result of his long work-related absences. Broadbent began writing the novel at age 49, after taking a Jacksons Lane course in creative writing. In relation to Descent, Broadbent said, "I didn't really set out to write a novel... I was writing about a woman who gets to that point in her life that everything seems to be collapsing."
