= The Canadian Caver =

Semiannual Canadian cave publication

Front cover of Summer 2007 edition

The Canadian Caver is a semiannual publication that documents the activities of Canadian cavers exploring caves within Canada and overseas.

The Canadian Caver was created by members of the McMaster University Climbing and Caving Club from McMaster University in Hamilton, Ontario to document cave explorations throughout North America at a time when Canada's fledgeling caving clubs had no club newsletters. The first issue was produced in December 1969 and included articles on cave exploration in Alberta, Mexico, West Virginia and Georgia, and climbing in the Bugaboos of British Columbia.

By 1974 caving clubs in western Canada had achieved a level of maturity and stability (aided by the emigration of MUCCC cavers) that allowed the production and editorship of The Canadian Caver to move to Edmonton, Alberta, where it remained for several years. In 1978 cavers from Vancouver Island produced an issue, which introduced the concept of a roving production/editorship that persists to the present day.

The advent of computers and inexpensive printing in the mid-1980s meant that Canada's principal caving clubs began to document cave explorations in their own newsletters, which presented a challenge of relevancy to The Canadian Caver. Rather than being the sole archive of cave surveys and histories of cave explorations, The Canadian Caver now provides a semiannual synopsis of the more significant cave explorations by Canadians at home and abroad.

The Canadian Caver serves as a national voice for cavers in Canada, a country that lacks a formal national caving organization. The Canadian Caver itself has no formal organization, no public funding, no fixed format, no long-range planning and no permanent editors.
