= Descent (2017 film) =

2017 Nigerian film

- Theatrical release poster
- Directed by: Abdulfatai Awal
- Written by: Bridget Phathudi; Abdulfatai Awal
- Produced by: Nwankwo Chibuzor
- Starring: Zack Orji; Matt Stern; Palesa Madisakwane; JT Medupe; Tayo Faniran; Benedikt Sebastian
- Release date: December 1, 2017
- Language: English

Descent is a 2017 Nigerian film produced by Nwankwo Chibuzor. Descent addresses issues relating to family, narcotics, love and karma. Descent has won a Recognition Award for Best Picture International Trailer and at the year won the Special Movie Award (SMA) in the Republic of The Gambia.

== Synopsis ==
Descent tells a story of two underworld kings whose greed and thirst for power and vengeance brought them to hurting each other's family. Descent is a combination of drama and action as the suspense and emotions can put viewers on the edge and in tears. The movie highlights a true African story of family, betrayal, trust, greed and power.

== Cast ==
Some of the major characters in the movie include;

- Zack Orji as Kalu Achebe
- Matt Stern as Andrew Morgan
- Palesa Madisakwane
- JT Medupe
- Tayo Faniran
- Benedikt Sebastian
