= Burrington Combe =

Limestone gorge in north Somerset, England

- Site of Special Scientific Interest
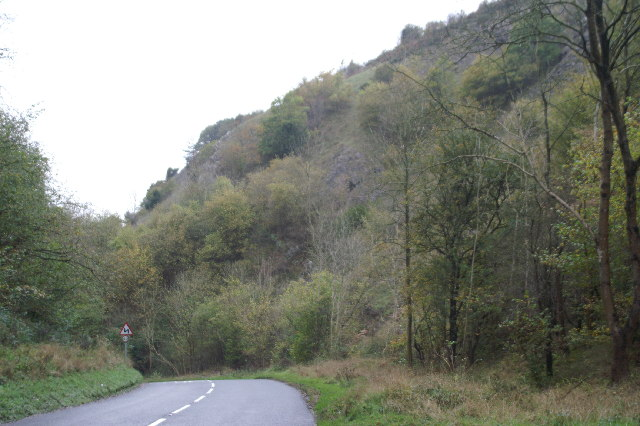

- Location within Somerset
- Location of Burrington Combe.
- Area of search: Avon
- Grid reference: ST478583
- Coordinates: 51.32140°N 2.75047°W
- Interest: Biological and Geological
- Area: 139.1 ha (344 acres)
- Notification date: 1952

Burrington Combe is a Carboniferous Limestone gorge near the village of Burrington, on the north side of the Mendip Hills Area of Outstanding Natural Beauty, in North Somerset, England.

"Combe" or "coombe" is a word of Celtic origin found in several forms on all of the British Isles, denoting a steep-sided valley or hollow. Burrington Combe is a gorge through the limestone hills although there is now no river running through it. Various cave entrances are exposed which have been occupied by humans for over 10,000 years, with a hillfort being built beside the combe in the Iron Age. The geology has led to a diversity of plant life.

According to legend Augustus Montague Toplady was inspired to write the hymn Rock of Ages while sheltering under a rock in the combe, although recent scholars have disputed this claim.

== Geology ==
Water draining from Black Down has exposed rocks from the Devonian sandstones of the Portishead Formation which show through the limestone, Carboniferous mudstones of the Avon Group, limestones of the Black Rock Limestone Subgroup and oolitic limestones of the Burrington Oolite Subgroup; however the exact mechanism by which the gorge was formed is unknown. The northern and lower end of the combe, which was once the bed of the Congresbury Yeo, cuts through overlying Clifton Down Limestone. Triassic dolomitic conglomerate can also locally be seen along the combe.

The gorge was originally formed during the Permo-Triassic period about 260 million years ago. At that time Britain had a warm arid climate, not dissimilar to northern Africa today. Occasionally flash floods cause huge volumes of water to run off the hills, forming wadis — an Arabic term for the steep-sided ravines characteristic of intermittent streams. Burrington Combe and its near neighbour, Cheddar Gorge are exhumed wadis. They were originally filled with Triassic rocks that have been eroded and 'exhumed' by glacial meltwaters at the end of the last Ice Age. Parts of Burrington Combe still have these Triassic rocks, forming an unconformity with the Carboniferous limestones along their sides and bottom.

At the end of the last Ice Age, permafrost blocked the joints and fissures in the limestone with ice and frozen mud, making the limestone impermeable. When the surface permafrost melted during the summers, water flowed on the surface, carving out the softer Triassic rocks, exhuming the wadi and leaving the landscape we see today.

== Caves ==
Archaeological discoveries of early cemeteries demonstrate human occupation of the combe and its caves from the Bronze Age with some evidence of occupation during the Upper Palaeolithic period. The combe contains the entrances to many of the caves of the Mendip Hills, including Aveline's Hole, Sidcot Swallet and Goatchurch Cavern. A through trip has been dug from Rod's Pot to Bath Swallet, which are both on the hills above the majority of Burrington caves. Further afield and equally accessible is Read's Cavern.

Goatchurch Cavern is 1,500 m (4,900 ft) long and has a surveyed depth of 61.5 m (202 ft). It was first recorded in 1736, and explored by lead miners in the 19th century. Around 1901, the owner unsuccessfully tried to turn it into a show cave. Notes of exploration in the 1920s record finds from the Pleistocene period including bones of mammoth, bear, hyena and cave lion. During November 2003 inscribed marks were noticed in Goatchurch Cavern while cleaning away graffiti. Three finely cut marks were uncovered, resembling the letter W with a patina darker than in nearby graffiti dated 1704. These have been identified as ritual protection marks (also known as witch marks or apotropaic marks), possibly dating from the period 1550 to 1750.

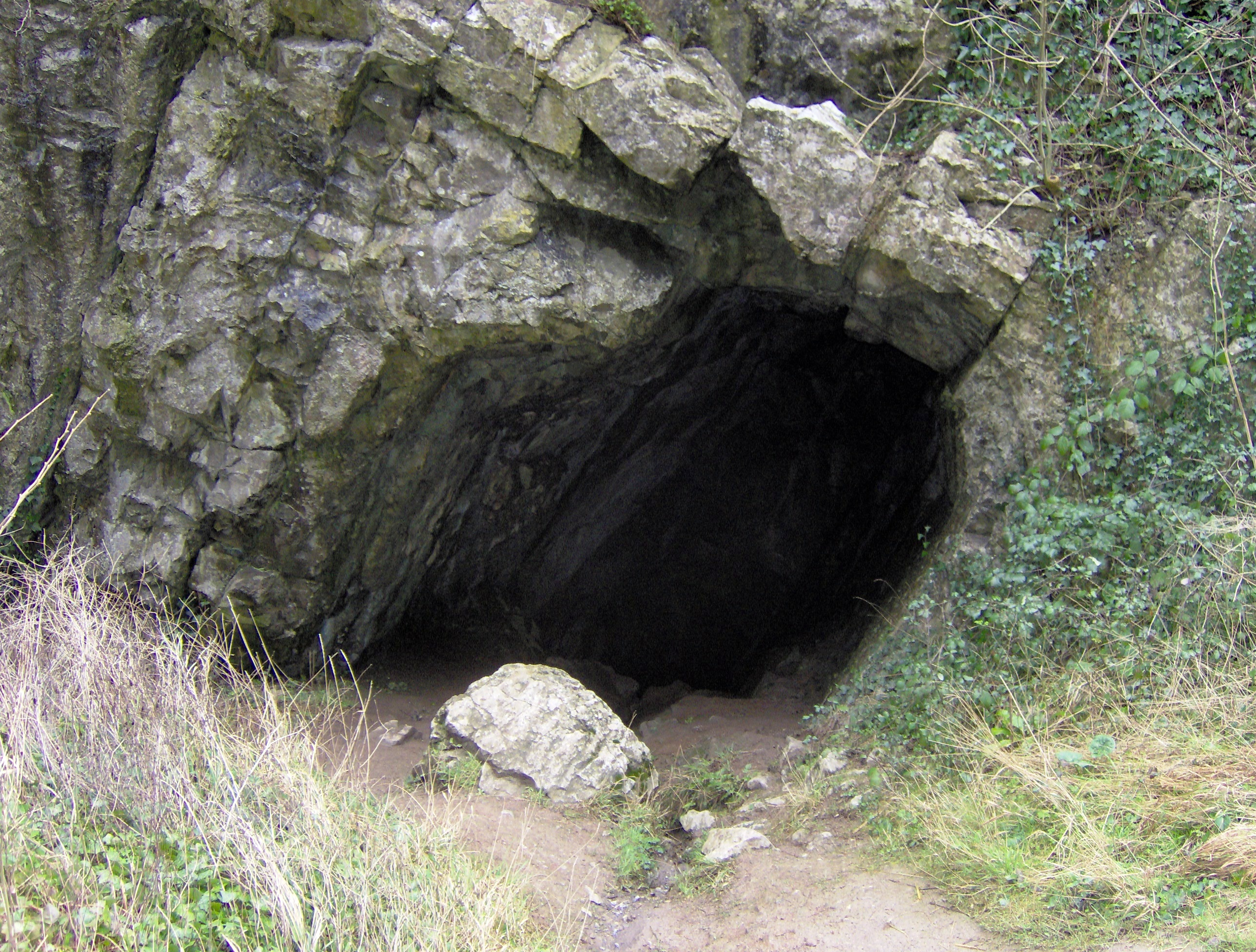
Aveline's Hole

A swallet, also known as a sinkhole, sink, shakehole, swallow hole or doline, is a natural depression or hole in the surface topography caused by the removal of soil or bedrock, often both, by water flowing beneath the water-table at considerable depth. Sidcot Swallet is named after the Sidcot School Speleological Society who explored it in 1925.

The earliest scientifically dated cemetery in Great Britain was found at Aveline's Hole. The human bone fragments it contained, from about 21 different individuals, are thought to be between roughly 10,200 and 10,400 years old. A series of inscribed crosses found on the wall of the Aveline's Hole cave are believed to date from the early Mesolithic period just after the Ice age.

== Hillfort ==
Above the combe on its eastern side is the site of an Iron Age univallate hill fort known as Burrington Camp. It is around 100 metres (330 ft) by 80 metres (260 ft) and includes Romano-British elements.

== Special Scientific Interest ==
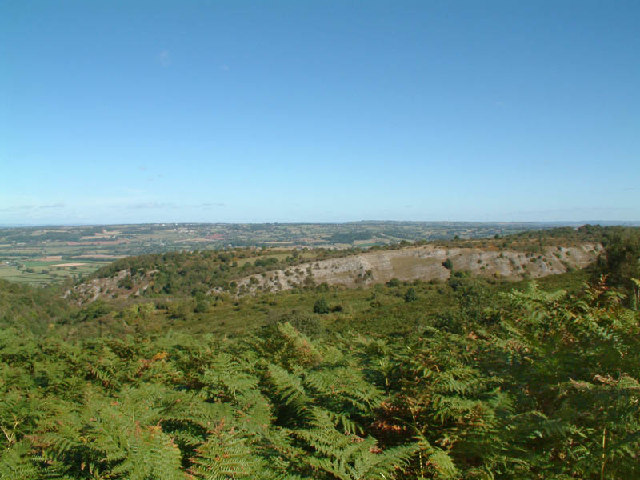
The combe and surrounding gorse

In recognition of its biological and geological interest, an area of 139.1 hectares (344 acres) within and around the combe was notified as a Site of Special Scientific Interest in 1952.

The calcareous grasslands support a diverse flora which includes salad burnet (Sanguisorba minor), knapweed (Centaurea scabiosa and Centaurea nigra), rock-rose (Helianthemum nummularium) and wild thyme (Thymus praecox). On the higher, more acidic, slopes goldenrod (Solidago virgaurea), wood sage (Teucrium scorodonia) and common bent (Agrostis capillaris) can be found. There are also scrub plants including hawthorn (Crataegus monogyna), mountain ash (Sorbus aucuparia), gorse (Ulex europaeus) and elder (Sambucus nigra). Several of the caves support bat populations.

Geologically it is recognised as a fluvial karst feature which partly intersects a buried and filled gorge of Triassic age.

== Rock of Ages ==
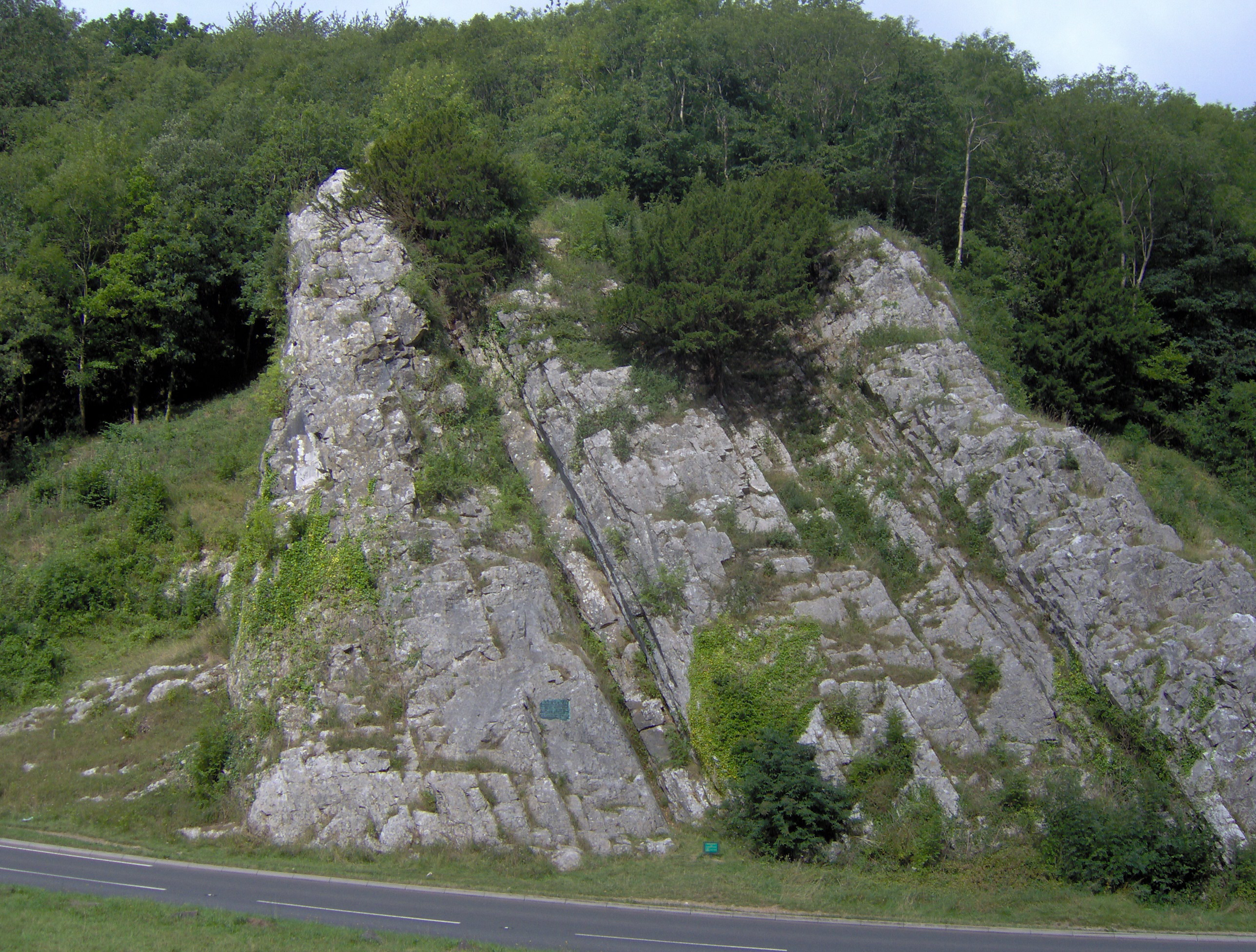
Rock of Ages, Burrington Combe

There is a legend that Augustus Montague Toplady (1740–78), who was the curate at Blagdon, was inspired to write the hymn Rock of Ages while sheltering under a rock in the combe during a thunderstorm in the late 18th century. The rock was subsequently named after the hymn. It is now generally accepted that the attribution of this location to the writing of Rock of Ages only arose well after Toplady's death (the 1850s is suggested by Percy Dearmer in Songs of Praise Discussed, 1933) and has no proven factual basis.

The then Vicar at Westbury-on-Trym H. J. Wilkins published a 16-page booklet in 1938 titled "An Enquiry concerning Toplady and his Hymn "Rock of Ages" and its connection with Burrington Combe, Somerset" that found that in relation to the hymn "All available evidence goes to show that it was published in 1776, soon after it was written." Toplady had left the neighbourhood of Burrington Combe in 1764.

In George Lawton's 1983 publication Within the Rock of Ages the author finds the claim that Rock of Ages was written at Burrington Combe to be only a legend, although he does state that "It is extremely doubtful whether at this distance of time, the legend that it was written in a cleft there can be proved or disproved." In George Ella's 2000 study A Debtor to Mercy Alone any links between the hymn and Burrington Combe are again said to be no more than legendary, with readers being referred to Lawton's 1983 study.

C. H. Sisson wrote a poem entitled Burrington Combe, collected in Exactions (Manchester: Carcanet 1980). The local area, including Black Down and Ellick Farm, features prominently in his poetry.
