= McrA RNA motif =

Conserved RNA structure

mcrA
- Consensus secondary structure and sequence conservation of mcrA RNA

Identifiers
- Symbol: mcrA
- Rfam: RF03010

Other data
- RNA type: Gene; sRNA
- SO: SO:0001263
- PDB structures: PDBe

The mcrA RNA motif is a conserved RNA structure that was discovered by bioinformatics.

mcrA motif RNAs are found in the genus Listeria, as well as two phages that infect such species: Listeria phage 2389 and Listeria phage B025.

mcrA RNAs are often found upstream of genes that encode restriction endonucleases of the mcrA type. These endonucleases are typically found in phages. This fact could suggest that the RNAs function as cis-regulatory elements. However, mcrA RNA are clearly associated with phages, which often organize their genes such that all (or many) genes are transcribed in one huge unit. Therefore, it is possible that mcrA RNAs are located upstream of protein-coding genes merely because they happen to be adjacent in these long phage transcripts.
