= Speleological Union of Ireland =

Representative body for caving on the island of Ireland

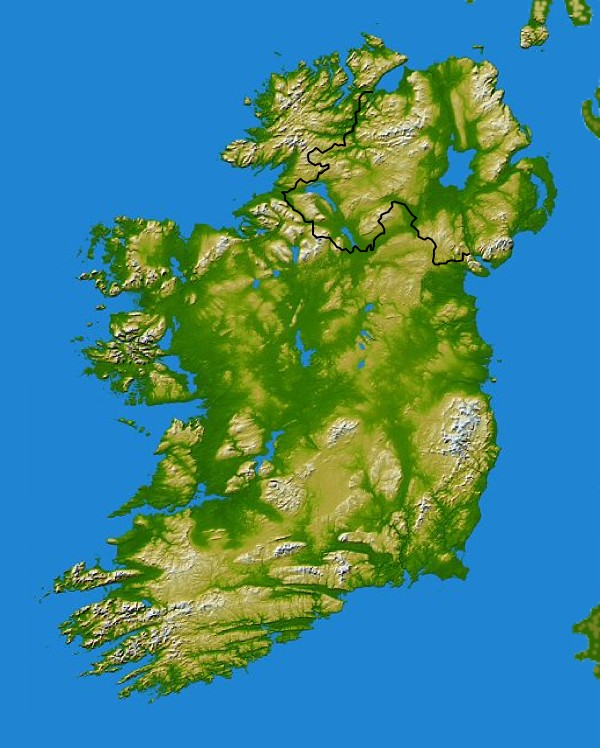
- Abbreviation: SUI
- Formation: 1964; 62 years ago
- Purpose: Speleology, representation of cavers, training, conservation, access, expedition funding.
- Region served: Northern Ireland; Republic of Ireland
- Main organ: Committee
- Affiliations: Irish Cave Rescue Organisation
- Website: caving.ie

The Speleological Union of Ireland (SUI) is the official representative body of cavers in Ireland, both in the Republic of Ireland and in Northern Ireland. It is affiliated with the Irish Cave Rescue Organisation.

== History ==
The SUI was founded as the Speleological Society of Ireland in 1964 to promote speleology (the scientific study of caves) in Ireland. Jack Coleman was the first president. The society was reconstituted in 1983 as the Speleological Union of Ireland. In 2002 the SUI was set up as a company limited by guarantee.

== Functions ==
The SUI provides training for cave leaders and new cavers and represents cavers' interests in disputes with landowners. It also works to protect Irish caves from damage by human influence, including dumping, quarrying, development, and promotes a strong conservation ethic to cavers. The organisation promotes awareness of caves and safe caving, providing information for beginners wishing to try caving.

The SUI publishes a scientific journal, Irish Speleology, and grant aid is often provided by the organisation for international caving expeditions. In August 2012 the Kozłowski Fund was additionally set up to support cave exploration within Ireland, in memory of prolific cave diver and explorer Artur Kozłowski.

The SUI, in conjunction with the Irish Cave Rescue Organisation, organises an annual symposium for Irish cavers, named SUICRO. It has been held every year since 1985, except for 2020, in compliance with restrictions in the Republic of Ireland and in Northern Ireland due to the global COVID-19 pandemic.

== Irish Speleology ==
Irish Speleology is the official caving journal published by the SUI. It is the longest-running caving journal in Ireland, and was first published in September 1965 as the Journal of the Speleological Society of Ireland. Volumes 1 to 4 were published as multiple issues, however following volume 4 issue 2, the next release was volume 13, and numbering has been sequential since.

Volume 23 of the journal, subtitled "Selected accounts of Irish caves 1680–1893" and published in October 2017, was nominated for the Tratman award: a literary award issued annually by the Ghar Parau Foundation, subsequently managed by the British Cave Research Association.

== Underground ==
The SUI produces a newsletter for members, named Underground, published up to four times per year. It provides up-to-date information on new discoveries, caving events, activities, rescue and safety, equipment and techniques in Irish caving.
