= Descent (magazine) =

UK caving magazine

- Editor: Chris Scaife
- Categories: Sport
- Frequency: Bi-monthly (February, April, June, August, October, December)
- Publisher: Stalactite Publishing
- First issue: January 1969
- Company: Stalactite Publishing
- Country: United Kingdom
- Language: English
- Website: www.descentmagazine.co.uk
- ISSN: 0046-0036

Descent magazine is a bi-monthly British and Irish full-colour print magazine dedicated to caving. It has been in print since 1969, first as a small format magazine and then, from 1977 onwards, in A4 format.

The publication is 'written by cavers, for cavers' and features high quality photographs and articles related to underground exploration. As well as the major features, Descent maintains a network of correspondents in each of the caving regions of the UK and Ireland. The correspondents gather reports on the latest caving discoveries and other caving news for their area.

Bruce Bedford was editor from 1969 until 1988. Chris Howes then began to work as editor and bought it from its previous publisher, Gloster Publications, in 1998, bringing it to his and Judith Calford's company, Wild Places Publishing. In 2022, after 34 years and 204 issues as editor, Chris and Judith stepped down with their final issue being for October 2022. As of October 2022, the editor is Chris Scaife working in partnership with Carolina Smith. Chris and Carolina are the owners of Kendal-based Stalactite Publishing.

== See also ==
- Caving in the United Kingdom
