= University of Bristol Spelæological Society =

Student caving club in the United Kingdom

The University of Bristol Spelæological Society (UBSS) was founded in 1919 by cavers in the University of Bristol. Among its earliest activities was the archaeological excavation of Aveline's Hole.

The club owns a hut, which was formerly a ladies' cricket pavilion. It was bought in 1919 for £5 and moved from its original plot to Burrington Combe, where it still stands.

== Publications and library ==
The club maintains one of the largest collections of caving books and journals in the country in its library in Bristol, as well as publishing the long-standing academic journal, Proceedings of the University of Bristol Spelæological Society.

Following numerous expeditions to the Burren, County Clare over the years, the UBSS has published the definitive guides to the caves of the region: Caves of Northwest Clare (1969), Caves of County Clare (1981), Caves of County Clare & South Galway (2003), Caves of Mid-West Ireland (2019) and Caves of southern Ireland (2022).

The club has an active Alumni society.

== Notable members ==
Notable past members of the club include Professor E. K. Tratman, who gave his name to Tratman's Temple in Swildon's Hole and to the 'Tratman Award', respected Irish spelæologist J. C. Coleman, Edward Fawcett FRS, anatomy professor and first president, and baking star Kim-Joy Hewlett.

== See also ==
- Cambridge University Caving Club
- Caving in the United Kingdom
