= List of cave rescue organizations =

This is a list of cave rescue organizations worldwide. Cave rescue is the responsibility of specific organizations founded to cover country, political region or caving area.

== Asia ==
=== China ===
- Mountain and Cave Rescue Team of China
- Cave Rescue of China (CRC)
- Mountain and Cave Rescue of GuangXi
- Mountain and Cave Rescue of China（MCRC）

=== Malaysia ===
- Malaysian Fire and Rescue Department
  - STORM
  - MOCSAR
  - MUST-Multi Skill Team

=== Pakistan ===
- Pakistan Cave Research Association

== Europe ==
=== Austria ===
- Österreichische Höhlenrettung, Austrian Cave Rescue

=== Belgium ===
- Spéléo Secours Belge, Belgian Cave Rescue

=== Bosnia Herzegovina ===
- Savez Gorskih Službi Spašavanja u BiH

=== Bulgaria ===
- Пещерно Спасяване, Cave Rescue Bulgaria

=== Croatia ===
- Croatian Mountain Rescue Service

=== France ===
- Spéléo Secours Français, French Cave Rescue

=== Germany ===
- HRVD - Höhlenrettungsverbund Deutschland, Alliance of German Cave Rescue Organizations
- Hoehlenrettung Baden - Wuerttemberg
- Höhlenrettung Südbayern

=== Greece ===
- Cave Rescue Team of the Hellenic Federation of Speleology

=== Hungary ===
- Bakonyi Barlangi Mentőszolgálat, Cave Rescue Bakony Mountains
- Barlangi Mentők Észak-Magyarországi Egyesülete, North Hungarian Cave Rescue (Bükk, Gömör-tornai Karszt)
- Magyar Barlangi Mentőszolgálat, Hungarian Cave Rescue

=== Ireland ===
- Irish Cave Rescue Organisation

=== Israel ===
- Cave Rescue Israel

=== Italy ===
- CNSAS, National Alpine Cliff and Cave Rescue Corps - Speleological Rescue

=== Montenegro ===
- Gorska Služba Spašavanja Crne Gore

=== North Macedonia ===
- Macedonian Speleological Federation

=== Norway ===
- Norsk Grotteredningstjeneste

=== Poland ===
- Specjalistyczna Grupa Ratownictwa Wysokościowego, PSP
- Górskie Ochotnicze Pogotowie Ratunkowe, Mountain Rescue
- Tatrzańskie Ochotnicze Pogotowie Ratunkowe, Tatra Mountain Rescue
- Grupa Ratownictwa Jaskiniowego Polskiego Związku Alpinizmu, Group Cave Rescue

=== Portugal ===
- Associação de Voluntariado de Proteção Civil Socorrismo, SAR-TEAM

=== Romania ===
- Corpul Român Salvaspeo – CORSA

=== Russia ===
- Soyuz Dobrovoltsev-speleospasateley (SDS) / Union of Volunteers Speleo Rescuers

=== Serbia ===
- Gorska Služba Spasavanja Srbije

=== Slovenia ===
- Jamarska reševalna služba(JRS) / Cave Rescue Service

=== Spain ===
- Fundación Espeleosocorro Cántabro ESOCAN

=== Switzerland ===
- Spéléo-Secours Suisse, Swiss Cave Rescue

=== Slovakia ===
- Horská záchranná služba - Jaskynná záchranná skupina, Mountain Rescue Service - Cave Rescue Department

=== United Kingdom ===
- British Cave Rescue Council (BCRC)

==== England ====
- Cave Rescue Organisation, Yorkshire
- Cornwall Search and Rescue Team, Cornwall
- Derbyshire Cave Rescue Organisation
- Devon Cave Rescue Organisation
- Mendip Cave Rescue Organisation
- Upper Wharfedale Fell Rescue Association
- Gloucestershire Cave Rescue Group
- South East Cave Rescue Organisation

==== Northern Ireland ====
- Irish Cave Rescue Organisation

==== Scotland ====
- Scottish Cave Rescue Organisation

==== Wales ====
- North Wales Cave Rescue Organisation
- South & Mid Wales Cave Rescue Team

Formerly
- Gwent Cave Rescue Team, South East Wales
- West Brecon Cave Rescue Team (South-West and mid-Wales)

== North America ==
=== Canada ===
- Alberta / British Columbia Cave Rescue Service (ABCCRS)
- British Columbia Cave Rescue, British Columbia
- Alberta Cave Rescue Organization, Alberta

=== United States ===
- Blacksburg Cave Rescue Group, Blacksburg, Virginia
- Chattanooga/Hamilton County Cave/Cliff Rescue Unit, Chattanooga, Tennessee
- Colorado Cave Rescue Network (CCRN) Denver, Colorado
- East Tennessee Cave Rescue, Knoxville, Tennessee
- Huntsville Cave Rescue Unit, Huntsville, Alabama www.HCRU.org
- Knoxville Rescue Squad Cave/Vert Team, Knoxville, Tennessee
- New Jersey Initial Response Team, Sussex County, New Jersey
- San Bernardino County Cave & Technical Rescue Team, San Bernardino, California
- Technical Rope And Cave Emergency Response Team (TRACER), Hardin County, Kentucky

== Oceania ==
=== Australia ===
- Australian Speleological Federation, Australian Cave Rescue
- New South Wales Cave Rescue Squad, Sydney, Australia

=== New Zealand ===
- CaveSAR (a specialist team of LandSAR, with support from the New Zealand Speleological Society)
