= John Volanthen =

British volunteer cave rescue diver

John Volanthen GM
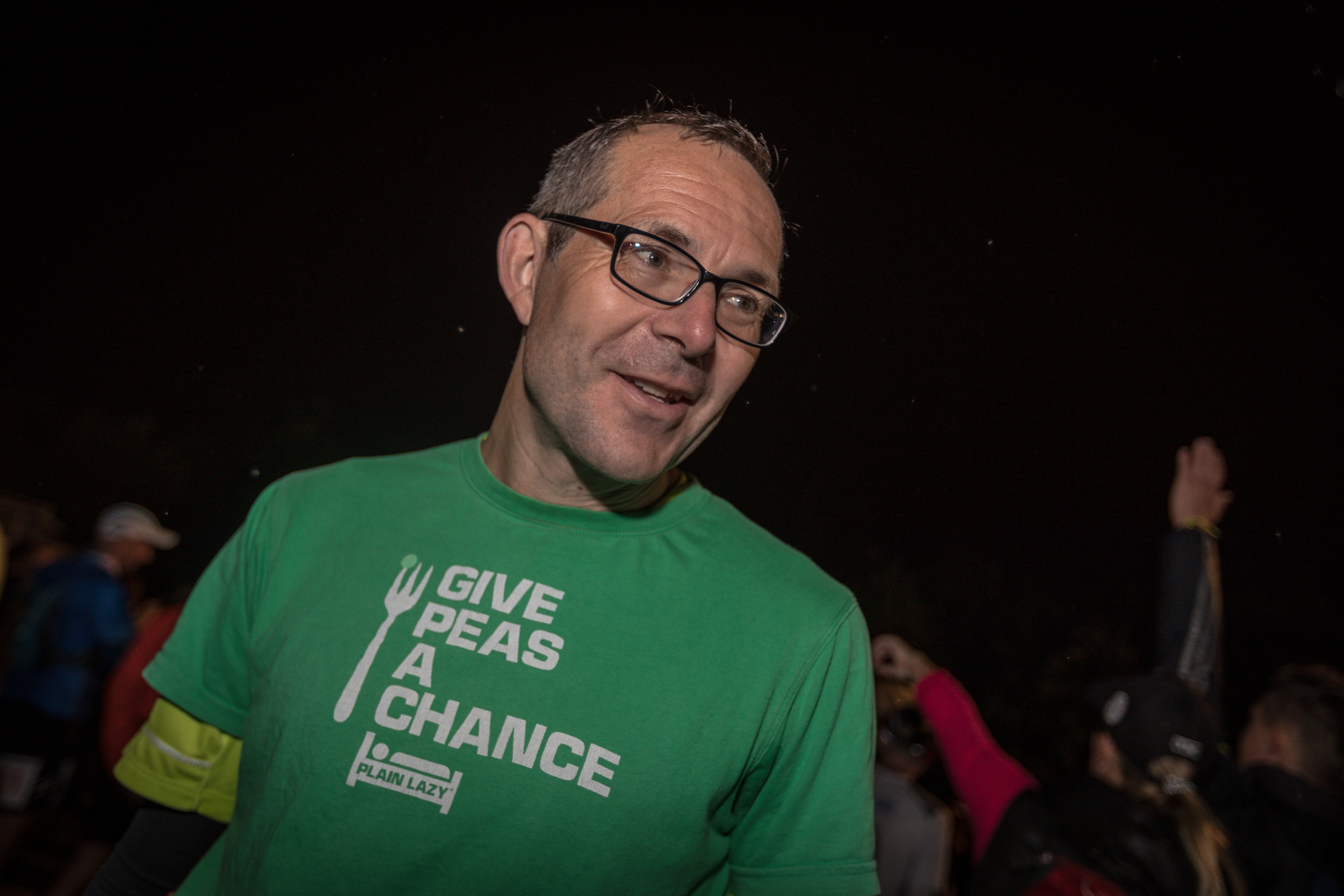
- Born: John Paul Volanthen; June 1971 (age 55); Brighton, Sussex, England
- Education: De Montfort University
- Occupation: IT consultant
- Known for: Cave diving, cave rescue

John Paul Volanthen, GM (born June 1971) is a British cave diver who undertakes cave rescues through the Cave Rescue Organisation, South and Mid Wales Cave Rescue, and the British Caving Association. In 2018, he played a leading role in the Tham Luang cave rescue, for which he was made a Thai Knight Grand Cross of the Order of the Direkgunabhorn and received the UK's George Medal.

He cave-dives as a hobby and conducts rescues as a volunteer. He works as an IT consultant in Bristol.

== Early life and education ==
Volanthen was born in June 1971, and grew up in Brighton, England. Volanthen's surname is an anglicised spelling of the Swiss surname "Vonlanthen"; his paternal grandfather was Swiss. He attended Longhill High School in Rottingdean, and later De Montfort University in Leicester where he studied electronics.

== Caving and rescues ==
=== Early interest ===
Volanthen's interest in caving began when he was a scout. He began cave diving through a social club when he attended college.

=== Rescues ===
Volanthen frequently cave dives and conducts rescues with a partner, Richard Stanton. He was part of a team that attempted a cave rescue of Eric Establie in 2010, in the Dragonnière Gaud Cave near Labastide-de-Virac in the Ardèche region of France, which was ultimately unsuccessful. In 2011, Volanthen assisted in the recovery of the body of Polish cave diver Artur Kozłowski from a cave in Kiltartan, Ireland. Norwegian authorities asked him to assist in recovering the bodies of two Finnish divers from Jordbrugrotta in 2014, but after diving down to the site he and his colleagues assessed the operation to be too risky. The bodies were subsequently recovered by Finnish and Norwegian divers.

In 2018, he helped locate a youth football team in the Tham Luang cave rescue; he and Stanton were the first to make contact with them. Poor visibility, cave and rescue debris, and low temperatures were all obstacles to cave diving in search of the team. Volanthen placed guidelines in the cave to assist others in navigation. After he ran out of line, he swam to the surface - there he found the missing team and the adult coach. Volanthen's voice is that heard on a widely broadcast video of the first contact with the football team, asking "How many of you?" When he learned that all the missing people were accounted for, he replied, "Brilliant." He and Stanton did not have any food to offer the team when they encountered them, but they gave them a light. When they left the team, Volanthen promised them that he would come back, doing so by assisting in delivering food.

Volanthen disputed the notion that encountering the team was due to luck, saying that he and Stanton systematically surfaced at every airspace in the flooded cave passages to shout and listen for a response, as well as to smell for any indicators of human waste signifying the current or past presence of the team. They smelled the team before they saw them. Volanthen also assisted in rescuing members of the team; the children were sedated and then lashed to the divers. Parts of the cave were so narrow that the children were pushed in front of the divers. At other times, the children were held close to the chest or out to the side. Volanthen said that the children were held as if carrying a "shopping bag."

In a BBC interview after the rescue, Volanthen was asked, "Can you see that what you did was fairly remarkable?" He responded, "I can see it was a first, how's that?"

=== Records ===
In 2004, Volanthen and Stanton set a record for the greatest depth achieved in a British cave, diving 76 m (249 ft) at Wookey Hole in Somerset. In 2010, Volanthen, Stanton, Jason Mallinson, and René Houben set a world record for the longest cave penetration dive, reaching 8,800 m (28,900 ft) in the Pozo Azul cave system in the Rudrón Valley in Spain.

=== Equipment ===
Volanthen designs and constructs some of his own diving equipment, and has been called a "technical guru." He designed a mapping device that collects information while diving. He also designs and modifies his own rebreathers to increase their compactness and efficiency.

== Awards and honours ==
Volanthen was awarded the Royal Humane Society's bronze medal in 2012 for a rescue attempt of a diver in a French cave, and for the discovery of the diver's body.

In September 2018, he was given the Bronze Cross, The Scout Association's highest honour, awarded for "heroism or action in the face of extraordinary risk."

Also in September 2018 the Thai king granted a royal decoration, the Most Admirable Order of the Direkgunabhorn, to 188 people who were involved in the rescue of the football team—114 foreigners, including Volanthen who received the award at First Class (Knight Grand Cross) level, and 74 Thais. The official list of recipients was published in the Royal Thai Government Gazette on 21 March 2019.

In November 2018, Volanthen and five other members of the British cave rescue team were given the Pride of Britain 2018 award for "Outstanding Bravery" for the Tham Luang incident. The rescued children attended the award ceremony, in London.

In the 2019 New Year Honours, Volanthen and Stanton were awarded the George Medal (GM) for their roles at Tham Luang. Three other members of their team were made Members of the Order of the British Empire and two were awarded the Queen's Gallantry Medal. Volanthen was also awarded the Royal Humane Society's Stanhope Medal for his role in the rescue.

He has an honorary degree from the University of Bristol (2022).

== Books ==
- Volanthen, John (2021). Thirteen Lessons that Saved Thirteen Lives: The Thai Cave. Aurum. ISBN 9780711266094.

== Personal life ==
As a hobby, Volanthen runs marathons and ultramarathons. He is also a volunteer scout leader with the Somerset Scouts, taking children on cave excursions. He was formerly married to Annabelle Richards.

He is portrayed by Colin Farrell in Thirteen Lives, the 2022 film about the Thai cave rescue.

== See also ==
- Cave Diving Group – UK based cave diver training and certification agency
- Cave rescue – Specialized field of wilderness rescue
- Caving in the United Kingdom
