= Rick Stanton =

British cave diver who specialises in rescues

Rick Stanton MBE GM
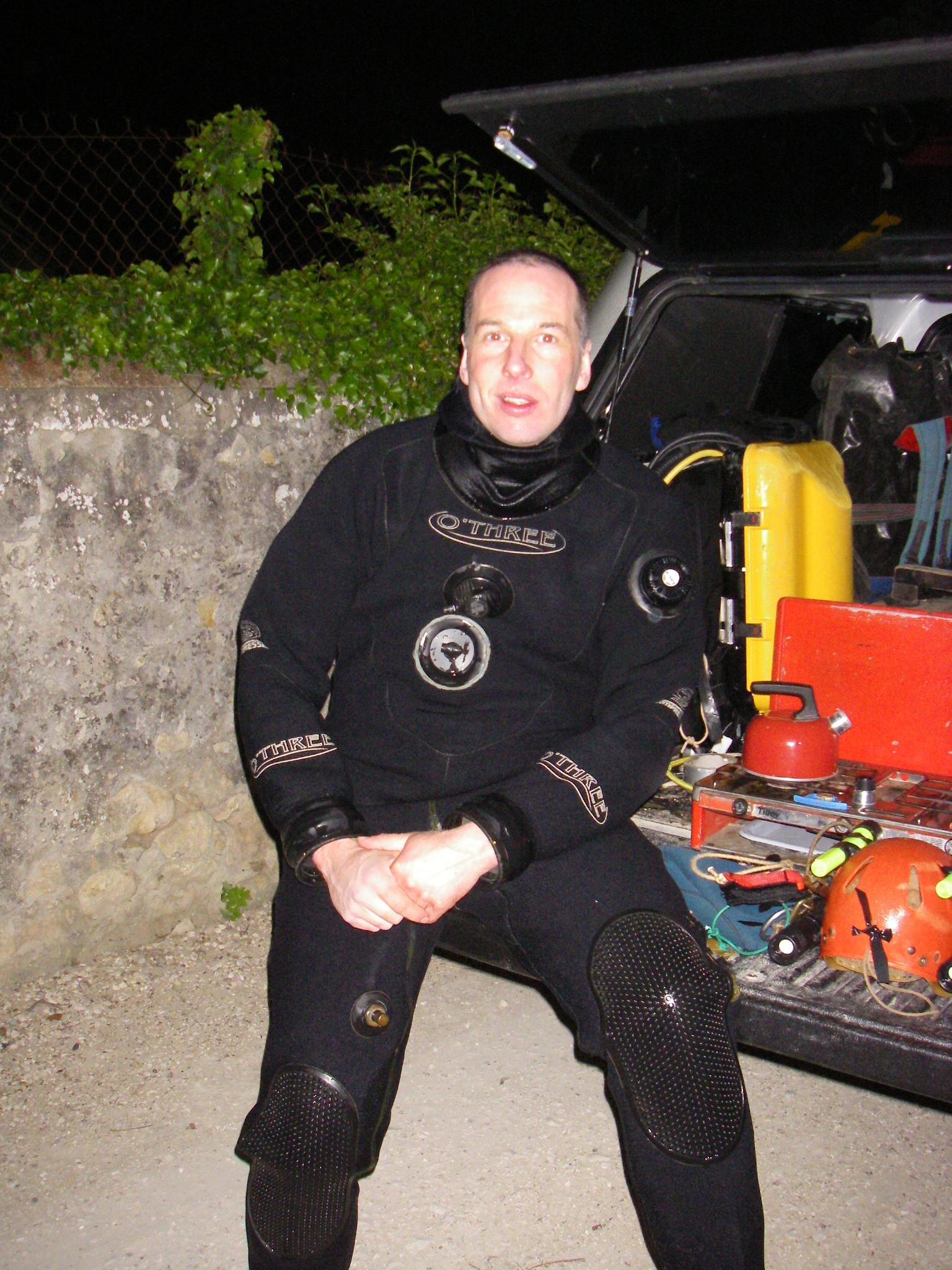
- Stanton in 2008
- Born: Richard William Stanton; 1961 (age 64–65); Epping Forest, Essex, England
- Education: Aston University
- Occupation: Firefighter
- Known for: Cave diving, cave rescue

Richard William Stanton, MBE, GM (born 1961) is a British cave diver who specialises in rescues through the Cave Rescue Organisation and the British Cave Rescue Council. He has been called "one of the world's most accomplished cave-divers", "the face of British cave diving," and "the best cave diver in Europe". Stanton has lived in Coventry for many years and was formerly a firefighter with the West Midlands Fire Service for 25 years prior to his retirement. In 2018 he played a leading role in the Tham Luang cave rescue for which he was made a Knight Grand Cross of the Order of the Direkgunabhorn in Thailand and awarded the UK's George Medal.

== Early life ==
Stanton was born in 1961 and grew up in Epping Forest District in Essex. He attributes his interest in cave diving to a television programme he watched as a teenager, The Underground Eiger, saying, "After watching it, I just knew that cave-diving was for me." Stanton studied at Aston University, where he joined both the caving and the diving clubs. He began as a self-taught diver in the River Lune in Cumbria and Lancashire.

Stanton has lived in Coventry for many years, and was formerly a firefighter with the West Midlands Fire Service for 25 years prior to his retirement.

== Caving and rescues ==
=== Rescues ===
Stanton usually cave dives and conducts rescues with a partner, John Volanthen. In 2004 he was involved in the rescue of six British cavers who were trapped in a cave at the Alpazat caverns in Mexico for eight days. Stanton was also part of a team that attempted a cave rescue of Eric Establie, in the Dragonnière Gaud Cave near Labastide-de-Virac in the Ardèche region of France, in 2010 which was ultimately unsuccessful.

In 2011, Stanton assisted in the recovery of the body of Polish cave diver Artur Kozłowski from Pollonora cave at Kiltartan, Ireland.

Norwegian authorities asked Stanton to assist to recover the bodies of two Finnish divers from Jordbrugrotta in 2014, but after diving down to the site he and his colleagues deemed the operation too dangerous. He had completed another recovery there in 2006.

In July 2018, he helped locate a youth football team in the Tham Luang cave rescue. After locating and participating in the rescue of the missing team and its coach, Stanton said that he and the other cave divers involved were not heroes, saying, "We’re just using a very unique skill set, which we normally use for our own interest and sometimes we’re able to use that to give something back to the community."

Stanton later said: "I think I hold great pride in what we did. You could say it’s justification for the dedication I put forward into a ridiculous minority sport that no one ever took seriously."

=== Records ===
In 2004 Stanton and Volanthen set a world record for greatest depth achieved in a British cave, cave diving 76 m (249 ft) at Wookey Hole in Somerset. In 2010 Stanton, Volanthen, Jason Mallinson, and René Houben set a world record for longest cave penetration dive, obtaining 8,800 m (28,900 ft) in the Pozo Azul cave system in the Rudrón Valley in Spain.

=== Equipment ===
Stanton is a technical diver, developing his own diving gear. He developed two closed-circuit rebreather units; this novel technology has been "instrumental in his achieving cave diving depth records around the world." One modification was to allow the rebreather to be worn on the side of the body rather than the chest or back. This is advantageous in fitting through smaller spaces. He builds prototypes of his designs and tests them in swimming pools before using them in caves.

He also uses underwater scooters to dive more efficiently, travelling greater distances while conserving energy and oxygen supplies.

== Bibliography ==
- Aquanaut: A Life Beneath the Surface - The Inside Story of the Thai Cave Rescue. 2021. Michael Joseph ISBN 978-0241421260

== Awards and honours ==
Stanton has been called "one of the world's most accomplished cave-divers", "the face of British cave diving," and "the best cave diver in Europe".

In 2008 Stanton received the EUROTEK "Diver of the Conference Award" for his "significant contribution to advanced and technical diving." Stanton's rescue attempt of a diver in a French cave, and assistance in identifying the location of that diver's body, earned him the Royal Humane Society's bronze medal in 2012. In 2021 Stanton also received the 'Hero of the Year' award at the West Midland Fire Service's Aspire Awards.

Stanton was appointed a Member of the Order of the British Empire (MBE) in the 2013 New Year Honours, "For services to Local Government".

In September 2018 the Thai king granted a royal decoration, the Most Admirable Order of the Direkgunabhorn, to 188 people who were involved in the rescue of the football team—114 foreigners, including Stanton who received the award at First Class (Knight Grand Cross) level, and 74 Thais. The official list of recipients was published in the Royal Thai Government Gazette on 21 March 2019.

In November 2018, Stanton and five other members of the British cave rescue team were given the 2018 Pride of Britain Award for "Outstanding Bravery" for the Tham Luang incident. The rescued children attended the award ceremony, in London. On 28 December 2018 it was announced that Stanton and Volanthen would receive the George Medal in the 2019 New Year Honours for their roles at Tham Luang. Three other members of their team were appointed MBEs and two were awarded the Queen's Gallantry Medal.

On 21 November 2021 explorer Mark Wood, Chairman of the Great Britain and Ireland Explorers Club Chapter, awarded Stanton a chapter coin in recognition of the role he played in the 2018 Thai cave rescue.

He has honorary degrees from Coventry University (2019) and the University of Bristol (2022).

== Personal life ==
Stanton lives in Coventry.

He is portrayed by Viggo Mortensen in Thirteen Lives, the 2022 film about the Thai cave rescue.

== See also ==
- Cave Diving Group – UK based cave diver training and certification agency
- Caving in the United Kingdom
