= Cave rescue =

Specialized field of wilderness rescue

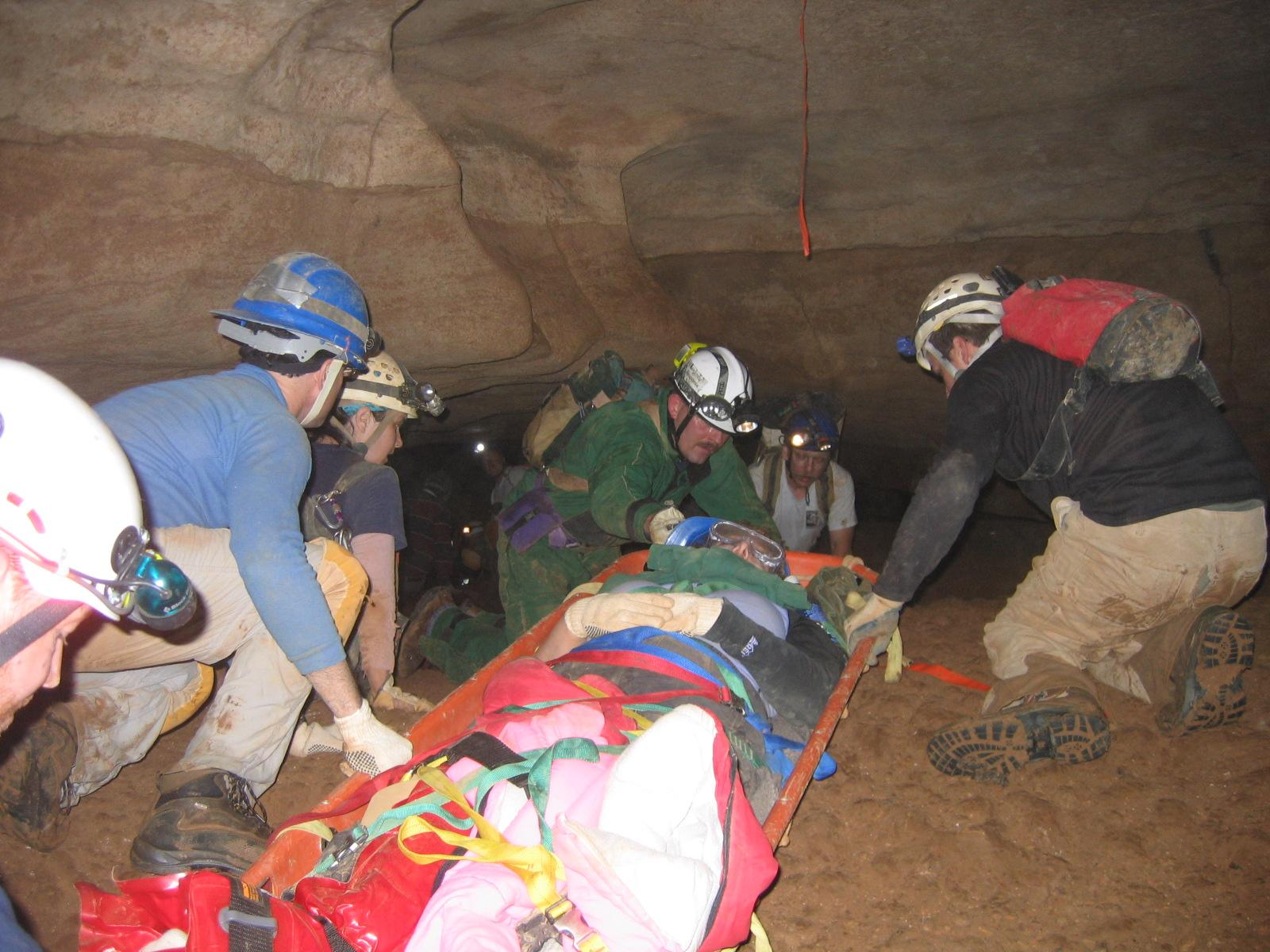
Chattanooga/Hamilton County Cave Rescue Team transporting an injured caver with a dislocated ankle

Cave rescue is a highly specialized field of wilderness rescue in which injured, trapped or lost cave explorers are medically treated and extracted from various cave environments.

Cave rescue borrows elements from confined space rescue, rope rescue and mountaineering techniques but has also developed its own special techniques and skills for performing work in conditions that are almost always difficult and demanding. Since cave accidents, on an absolute scale, are a very limited form of incident, and cave rescue is a very specialized skill, normal emergency staff are rarely employed in the underground elements of the rescue. Instead, this is usually undertaken by other experienced cavers who undergo regular training through their organizations and are called up as need.

Cave rescues are slow, deliberate operations that require both a high level of organized teamwork and good communication. The extremes of the cave environment (air temperature, water, vertical depth) dictate every aspect of a cave rescue. Therefore, the rescuers must adapt skills and techniques that are as dynamic as the environment they must operate in.

== Overview ==
A network of international cave rescue units is organised under the banner of the Union Internationale de Spéléologie (UIS). Most international cave rescue units are listed with contacts for use in the event of a cave incident.

The world's first cave rescue team, the Cave Rescue Organisation (CRO), was founded in 1935 in Yorkshire, United Kingdom. Like all UK cave rescue groups, it is composed of volunteer cavers and funded entirely by donations. In the UK, 16 regional groups provide underground rescue capability and mutual support for cave and mine rescue. Since 1967, the British Cave Rescue Council (BCRC) has coordinated cave rescue organizations in the United Kingdom.

== Notable examples ==
- Floyd Collins from Sand Cave, Kentucky, in 1925. Likely the first high-profile cave rescue in history. Collins' desperate situation in the depths of Sand Cave made headlines across America. Over 10,000 spectators flocked to Sand Cave in the week following the news of Floyd's predicament. The National Guard was called in to control the carnival-like atmosphere surrounding the cave. Despite the heroic efforts of volunteers who attempted to dig a parallel shaft to free Collins, he was found dead, buried to his shoulders in debris. One 25-pound (11 kg) rock had jammed Collins' foot, preventing his escape. Collins remained trapped in Sand Cave for another two months until a crew of German engineers finished the digging of the shaft and extracted his body.
- Marcel Loubens from Gouffre de la Pierre-Saint-Martin in the French Pyrenees in August 1952. Shortly after starting the ascent of the 1,135-foot (346 m) entrance shaft, Loubens's harness broke off, and he fell, tumbling 100 feet (30 m) down the boulder cone at the bottom. Members of Loubens's expedition spent over 24 hours attempting unsuccessfully to haul their friend back to the surface. Despite the efforts of the team doctor, Loubens died 36 hours into his rescue attempt. After his death the remaining members aborted their recovery attempt. Loubens's body remained in the cave for two more years before cavers returned him to the surface in 1954.
- Neil Moss in Peak Cavern, England in 1959. Trapped in a narrow tunnel, he was suffocated by carbon dioxide after prolonged efforts to free him. Rescuers were unable to free Moss and the family asked that his body remain in the cave.
- James G. Mitchell from Schroeder's Pants Cave in Manheim, New York in 1965. Mitchell was a 23-year-old chemist whose death made national headlines in February 1965 when he died of hypothermia after becoming stranded on rope in a 75-foot (23 m) pit with a frigid waterfall. Initial efforts to recover Mitchell's body failed. A rescue team was flown from Washington, D.C., on Air Force Two. A subsequent three-day effort to retrieve Mitchell was aborted after repeated failures and a collapse. The cave was abandoned and blasted shut, essentially making the cave a tomb. Mitchell's death made headlines again forty-one years later when a group returned to the cave and successfully recovered his remains.
- In 1967, six cavers were in Mossdale Caverns in North Yorkshire when a flash flood inundated the system. A major rescue attempt was made, but the men were discovered to have perished in the flood. It remains the worst caving disaster in the UK. Their remains were retrieved and buried further in the system four years later.
- Eight amateur cavers were found alive by divers after two days trapped in a Kentucky cave after flooding in 1983.
- Emily Davis Mobley from Lechuguilla Cave in New Mexico in 1991. More than 200 people worked over four days to bring her to the surface after her leg was broken. This was the deepest and most remote cave rescue in American history.
- A diving instructor was trapped in a cave air pocket in Venezuela in 1992 and later rescued by two American divers.
- Gerald Moni from McBrides Cave in Alabama in 1997. Moni and his group entered McBrides Cave in flood stage attempting a pull-down trip to the cave's lower entrance. A flash flood caused the situation in the cave to become extremely hazardous. While attempting to navigate a pit being inundated with a high flow of water, Gerald mistakenly grabbed only one of two ropes necessary to descend the pit. The resultant fall to a ledge part way down the drop resulted in a broken femur. A few members of the group managed to navigate the lower stream passage before it sumped and reached the surface. The others remained with Moni until local rescue agencies could mobilize and attempt a rescue. Rescue teams spent hours waiting for the water levels in the cave to recede enough to attempt an extraction. When teams finally reached Moni, he had been exposed to frigid water for over 12 hours. Rescue teams risked drowning themselves and Moni while traversing the flooded lower cave. 18 hours after his fall Moni was returned to the surface alive.
- Alpazat cave rescue in 2004. Several British military personnel on a recreational expedition were trapped in a cave in Mexico after flooding. They were rescued after nine days underground by Richard Stanton and Jason Mallinson from the British Cave Rescue Organisation.
- John Edward Jones in Nutty Putty Cave in Utah in November 2009. Jones, an inexperienced caver, had become wedged in an unmapped portion of Ed's Push at a 170-degree downward angle with his feet over his head, complicating rescue. After over 24 hours rescuers had been able to move him 2 feet (0.61 m) upward, and lower down food and water, when a part of the rescue rope system failed, dropping him fully back into the wedge. It was after this that he became too weak to help the rescuers in their efforts and he died shortly thereafter. Following this, it was decided by the family and landowner to leave his body in place and seal the cave permanently.
- In February 2014 two Finnish divers died in Jordbrugrotta, Norway. Norwegian authorities summoned an international team of cave divers including Britons Richard Stanton, John Volanthen and Jason Mallinson to recover the bodies. After diving to the site, they deemed the operation too difficult. A diving ban was later given for the cave. However, the involved Finnish divers returned later without official authorisation and recovered the bodies. Their recovery expedition was filmed as the documentary Diving into the Unknown. The diving ban was overturned on 31 March 2014.
- Riesending Cave rescue in 2014. Johann Westhauser was hit on the head by a boulder 1,148 metres (3,766 ft) below the entrance of Riesending Cave, in Germany. 728 people were involved in his evacuation, which took 11 days.
- Tham Luang cave rescue in 2018. Twelve members of the Moo Pa (Wild Boar) soccer team, aged 11–17, and one coach were trapped in the Tham Luang Nang Non Cave in Thailand. A search was immediately commenced when a ranger of the National Park in Chiang Rai province alerted authorities of the missing boys after seeing their unclaimed belongings at the entrance to the cave. The team was located, alive, on 2 July 2018 by British divers Richard Stanton and John Volanthen; they were assisted later by Jason Mallinson. More than 1,000 people were involved in the rescue operation, including teams from China, Myanmar, Laos, Australia, the UK, and the United States.
- In September 2023, Mark Dickey, an instructor with the US National Cave Rescue Commission, was rescued from Morca Cave in Turkey by a team of 196 people from 8 countries (Italy, Hungary, Bulgaria, Romania, Croatia, Poland, Albania, and the United States). Nine days after the rescue call, having been transfused for blood loss and fed intravenously, he was evacuated on a stretcher.

== See also ==
- List of cave rescue organizations
- Mine rescue
