= Cornwall Search & Rescue Team =

Cornwall Search and Rescue Team (formerly Cornwall Rescue Group) was a volunteer organisation that provided inland search and rescue cover for the county of Cornwall, England. It has since been replaced by East Cornwall Search & Rescue Team and West Cornwall Search & Rescue Team.

== History ==
In 1965, Climbers’ Club custodian Jim Smith established the first mountain rescue post in the South West at the Carn Galver Count House at Bosigran in West Cornwall. Rescues at Bosigran, famed for its 200-metre (660 ft) climb “Commando Ridge” nicknamed after the World War II commandos who trained there in preparation for wartime cliff assaults, would be performed by other climbers who would go to the Count House to collect the rescue equipment.

Later, a subsidiary post was established in the Lands End climbing area and also the Liskeard area, however the coastal posts (including Lands End) closed around 20 years later as the HM Coastguard developed their cliff rescue capabilities. Similarly, the two voluntary mine rescue teams operating in the county disbanded in 1999 and 2008, after the fire brigade developed their mine rescue capabilities.

Until 2002, incidents in inland Cornwall and on the moors were dealt with by the rescue teams from Dartmoor and Exmoor. However, due to an increase in call outs, it was decided that Cornwall needed its own team and Cornwall SRT was formed, originally with the name of Cornwall Rescue Group. This increase in callout numbers soon necessitated the split of Cornwall SRT into two regional rescue organizations; East and West Cornwall Search and Rescue Teams.

== Area covered ==
Cornwall has an area of about 3,500 square kilometres (1,400 sq mi) and the team covered all inland parts up to the border with Devon, with HM Coastguard covering the coastal areas. Although most of the county is farmland and semi-rural, over 300 square miles (780 km^{2}) of this is open moorland including tors and lowland heath.

Although the team bordered four other teams at the eastern end of the county, its promontory position means it had to be completely self-sufficient, being unable to rely on immediate help from neighbouring teams for incidents in the western parts of the team's area.

== Workload ==
The team was one of the busier teams in the South West, dealing with between 40 and 60 callouts a year. Like a lot of teams around the country, many of these callouts are “non mountain rescue”—searching for vulnerable people in rural locations. However the team dealt with its fair share of moorland jobs, mainly on and around Bodmin Moor, including casualty evacuations and rescue call outs directly from the ambulance service and the police (the size of the moor and vulnerability of inexperienced explorers making emergencies more probable).

Cornwall SRT was also occasionally called to assist during times of severe weather and during major incidents, having played a key role in the Boscastle flood and during heavy snowfall across the higher parts of Cornwall, e.g. in the winter of 2009/10. This is in addition to the more specialist roles which the team also had including the provision of casualty carers and technical specialists.

== Organisation ==
Led by a Team Leader and one deputy, at the time of its disbanding the team had around 45 surface search and rescue team members, based throughout Cornwall and one Search and Rescue Dog Association dog handler. Equipment was carried in three team vehicles which were based at Redruth, St Dennis and Bodmin. Two of these vehicles were Land Rover ambulances, and the other a control vehicle which also carried much of the technical equipment and swiftwater search and rescue team equipment.

The team was an essential part of the emergency services across Cornwall and was a member of Mountain Rescue (England and Wales), and also the regional coordinating body - the Peninsular Mountain and Cave Rescue Association (PenMaCRA).

Team members trained every Thursday evening at locations across Cornwall, and also one Sunday per month.

== Funding ==
The team was a registered charity and survived entirely on charitable donations. Unlike the other emergency services, it received no funding from the government, and on top of regular training and call outs, team members also had to organise fundraising activities to keep the team running.

== See also ==
- British Cave Rescue Council
- Mountain rescue in England and Wales
