= Saman Kunan =

Thai diver (1980–2018)

- สมาน กุนัน
- Born: December 23, 1980; Chaturaphak Phiman, Thailand
- Died: July 6, 2018 (aged 37); Tham Luang, Thailand
- Cause of death: Suffocation during Tham Luang cave rescue operation
- Resting place: Wat Ban Nong Khu, Roi Et
- Other name: Sergeant Sam
- Occupations: Military diver; security guard
- Honours: Knight Grand Cross of the Order of the White Elephant
- Military career
- Allegiance: Kingdom of Thailand
- Branch: Royal Thai Navy
- Rank: Petty officer first class; Lieutenant commander (posthumous)

Saman Kunan (Thai: สมาน กุนัน; December 23, 1980 – July 6, 2018) was a Thai Navy SEAL. After leaving the Navy, he worked as a security guard at Suvarnabhumi Airport. He died from suffocation during the Tham Luang cave rescue operation, earning him the title of 'Tham Luang Hero'. Saman was posthumously awarded the Knight Grand Cross (First Class) of the Most Exalted Order of the White Elephant, one of the country's highest honors, by King Vajiralongkorn.

Several monuments and sculptures have been erected to commemorate Saman. He is featured in a large mural titled "The Heroes", which has been installed in the new memorial hall at the entrance of the Tham Luang cave.

== Personal life ==
Saman Kunan was born on 23 December 1980 in Chaturaphak Phiman. He was the son of Vichai and Samran Kunan. He attended the Naval Academy School and joined the Underwater Demolition Assault Unit, also known as the Thai Navy SEALs. Saman resigned from the unit in 2006 to work for Airports of Thailand PCL as a security guard at the Suvarnabhumi Airport in Bangkok. He was married to Valeepoan Kunan. An athletic person, Saman was also an experienced triathlete, and a member of Nich-100Plus, a well-known Thai cycling team. He also practiced kayaking and hiking.

== Cave rescue and death ==
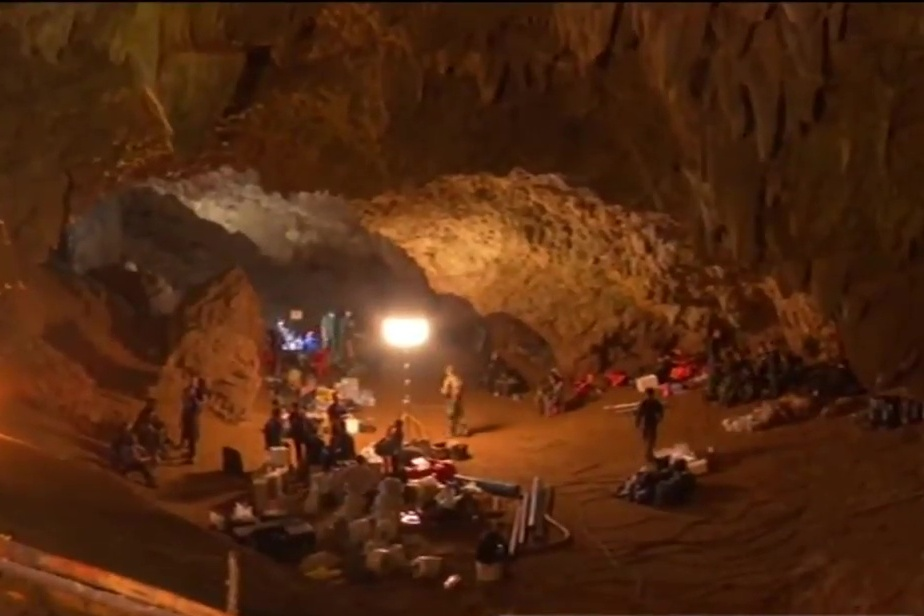
Tham Luang cave rescue, June 2018

In June and July 2018, Saman was a volunteer diver in the Tham Luang cave rescue, an international rescue operation to extract 12 boys and their football coach trapped in Tham Luang Nang Non, a large cave system beneath the Doi Nang Non mountain. On the evening of 5 July, Saman and a diving partner entered the cave to place air tanks along a planned exit route. On his way back, Saman ran out of air himself. His diving partner pulled him out of the water and performed CPR on Saman, but he did not regain consciousness. Saman was pronounced dead on 6 July, around 01:00. Later that day, his body was moved out of the cave, brought to the Mae Fah Luang - Chiang Rai Airport and flown to the U-Tapao Airport, near Bangkok, to receive the royal funeral.

== Funeral ==
On 7 July at 11:30, a funeral ceremony was held at the Roi Et Airport. A petty officer first class upon leaving the Navy, King Vajiralongkorn posthumously promoted Saman to lieutenant commander, an unprecedented rise of seven ranks. He was also awarded the Knight Grand Cross (first class) of the Most Exalted Order of the White Elephant.

On 14 July, Saman received a royal-sponsored cremation at the Wat Ban Nong Khu in the Roi Et province. The ceremony was attended by thousands of people.

In India, a sand sculpture of Lieutenant Commander Saman was created as a tribute to honor his bravery and contributions. Iker Casillas, a former goalkeeper for Spain, posted a photo of Saman on his Instagram and expressed his admiration.

On 12 July 2018, a charity was organized in Phayao province to raise funds for the family of Navy Lieutenant Saman. Approximately 500-700 people participated in the event, which raised over 200,000 baht in donations.

On 26 July 2018, a special football match was held at the Rajamangala Stadium to raise funds for his family. Six teams participated in the event, including Caravane, the Sports Authority of Thailand, the Royal Thai Naval Academy, the Naval Special Warfare Command, Mangpa Lo Klun, and the National Institute of Development Administration.

== Legacy ==
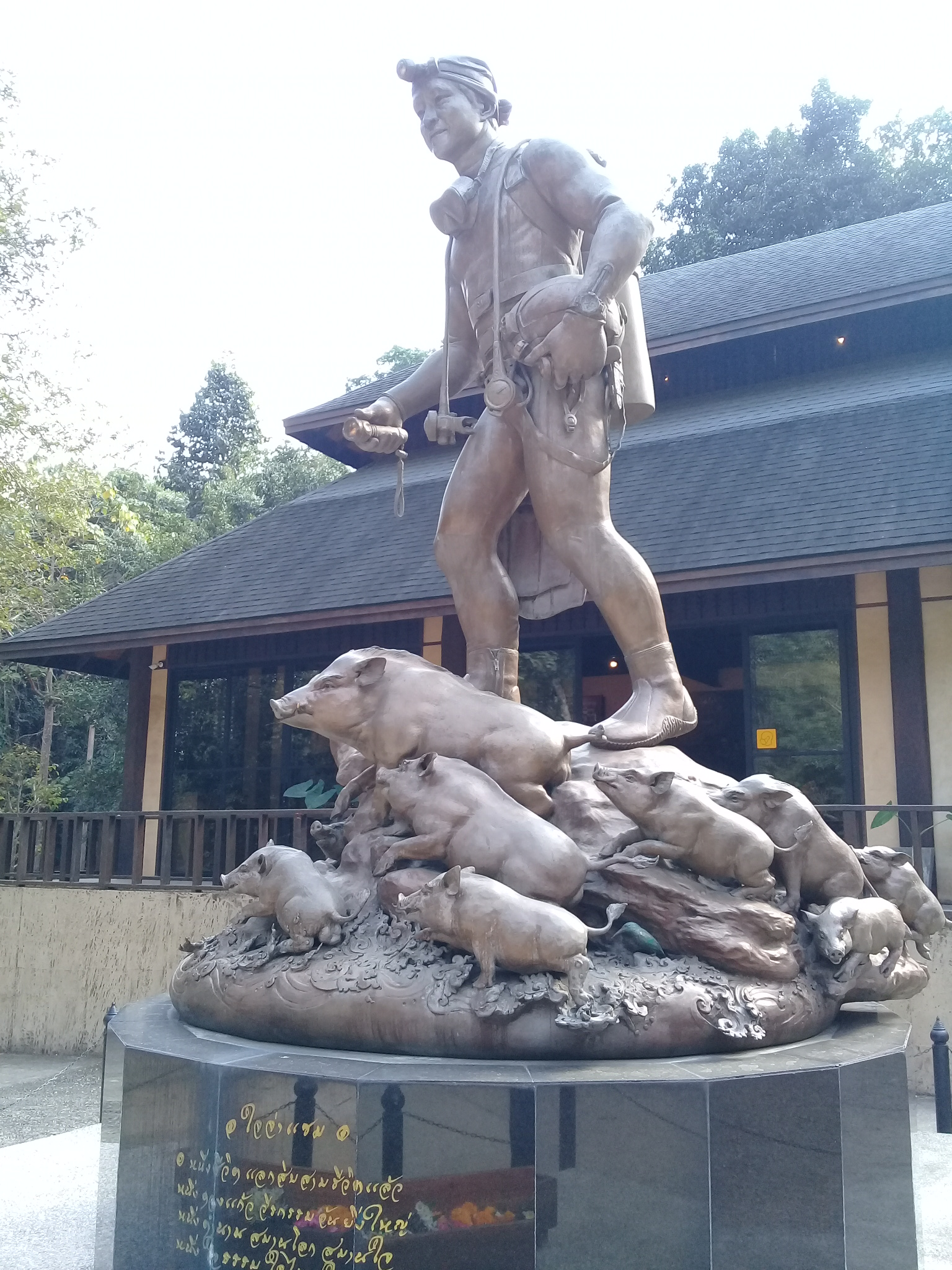
The bronze statue of Saman Kunan outside the Tham Luang cave

A memorial site has been established in the vicinity of Tham Luang, which has become a major tourist attraction. The site has brought together over 300 artists from Chiang Rai to create paintings and photographs for a multipurpose pavilion.

After he became a national hero, a bronze statue of him, designed by Chalermchai Kositpipat, was erected outside the Tham Luang cave. He is one of the key figures depicted in the film The Cave. Following a screening of the movie, his family was presented with THB 100,000.

In July 2019, the Airports of Thailand (AOT) established a large building named the Lt. Cdr. Saman Kunan Building in his honor. A 1.9-meter-wide by 2-meter-long bas-relief sculpture standing 2 meters high was installed in the building as a tribute.

In 2022, the Hollywood biographical survival film Thirteen Lives was released, in which he was portrayed by actor Sukollawat Kanarot.

== Awards ==
- 2018 - Knight Grand Cross (first class) of the Most Exalted Order of the White Elephant
