= Thirteen Lives =

2022 film by Ron Howard

- Promotional release poster
- Directed by: Ron Howard
- Screenplay by: William Nicholson
- Story by: Don Macpherson; William Nicholson
- Produced by: Brian Grazer; Ron Howard; Karen Lunder; William M. Connor; P.J van Sandwijk; Gabrielle Tana
- Starring: Viggo Mortensen; Colin Farrell; Joel Edgerton; Tom Bateman
- Cinematography: Sayombhu Mukdeeprom
- Edited by: James D. Wilcox
- Music by: Benjamin Wallfisch
- Production companies: Metro-Goldwyn-Mayer Pictures; Bron Creative; Imagine Entertainment; Storyteller Productions; Magnolia Mae Films
- Distributed by: United Artists Releasing; Amazon Studios
- Release dates: July 29, 2022 (United States); August 5, 2022 (Prime Video)
- Running time: 147 minutes
- Countries: United States; United Kingdom; Canada
- Languages: Thai; English; Northern Thai
- Budget: $55 million

Thirteen Lives is a 2022 biographical survival film, based on the Tham Luang cave rescue, directed and produced by Ron Howard and written by William Nicholson. The film stars Viggo Mortensen, Colin Farrell, Joel Edgerton, and Tom Bateman.

Thirteen Lives was released in select theaters in the United States on July 29, 2022, by United Artists Releasing, and began streaming on Prime Video on August 5, 2022. The film received generally positive reviews from critics.

== Plot ==
On June 23, 2018, twelve boys of the junior football team "Wild Boars" and their assistant coach Ekkaphon Chanthawong leave practice to explore the Tham Luang cave. When the team fails to arrive at a birthday party organized by their parents, their families head to the caves, only to find them flooded and the boys missing, their bikes left at the entrance. The parents immediately alert emergency services.

Royal Thai Navy SEALs, led by Captain Arnont, arrive to search for the missing boys, but find the dive too difficult to locate the team. Vernon Unsworth, a local British caver, shares his extensive knowledge of the complex and dangerous cave and suggests the authorities get in touch with the British Cave Rescue Council. British cavers Rick Stanton and John Volanthen travel to Thailand and attempt the dive, finding the boys and coach four kilometres from the entrance. During an attempt to deliver air tanks to the boys to keep them alive in preparation for the rescue, former Thai Navy SEAL Saman Kunan drowns.

Meanwhile, as hundreds of volunteers try to mitigate poor weather conditions, a water technician from Bangkok gains the permission of local farmers to divert water from the mountain onto their fields, destroying their crop.

Realising the boys will have to be removed through the cave, via a six-hour dive, knowing what the risks are, Stanton and Volanthen contact Dr. Richard Harris, plus supporting divers Chris Jewell and Jason Mallinson. With permission from the regional governor and minister, the divers sedate the boys and, with one diver per boy, carry each member out of the cave safely. The coach is removed last.

The end scene is the boys celebrating the birthday party that was supposed to happen on the day they went into the cave. The end credits reveal that the coach and three of the boys, who were all stateless, are given Thai citizenship.

The film is dedicated to Saman Kunan, the Thai Navy SEAL who died on July 6, 2018, during the rescue operation, and Beirut Pakbara, a Thai Navy SEAL who later died from a blood infection.

== Cast ==
- Viggo Mortensen as Richard Stanton
- Colin Farrell as John Volanthen
- Joel Edgerton as Richard Harris
- Tom Bateman as Chris Jewell
- Pattarakorn Tangsupakul as Buahom
- Sukollawat Kanarot as Saman Kunan
- Teerapat Sajakul as Captain Arnont
- Sahajak Boonthanakit as Governor Narongsak Osatanakorn
- Vithaya Pansringarm as General Anupong Paochinda
- Teeradon Supapunpinyo as Ekkaphon Chanthawong
- Nophand Boonyai as Thanet Natisri
- Thira Chutikul as Kiat
- Popetorn Soonthornyanakij as Kan
- Paul Gleeson as Jason Mallinson
- Lewis Fitz-Gerald as Vernon Unsworth
- Peter Knight as Police Captain Bas
- U Gambira as Kruba Boonchum
- Josh Helman as Major Hodges
- Natvara Hongsuwan as Preeya
- Pasakorn Hoyhon as Chai, the smallest boy in the team
- Tanatat Srita as Arm, team captain
- Achi Jinapanyo as Prem, the boy who celebrated his birthday on the day the group entered the cave
- Kaokuson Sorapap as Aat
- Sukniran Sukcharoen as Poom
- Ensai O'Haire as Decha
- Thanthapthai Chanin as Dew
- Thanaphat Thopiata as Wit
- Phitakphong Boonnet as Rit
- Joe Chuensawan as Tul
- Nawanut Kaeomueangsi as Nop
- Thitiphat Bheganan as Don

== Production ==
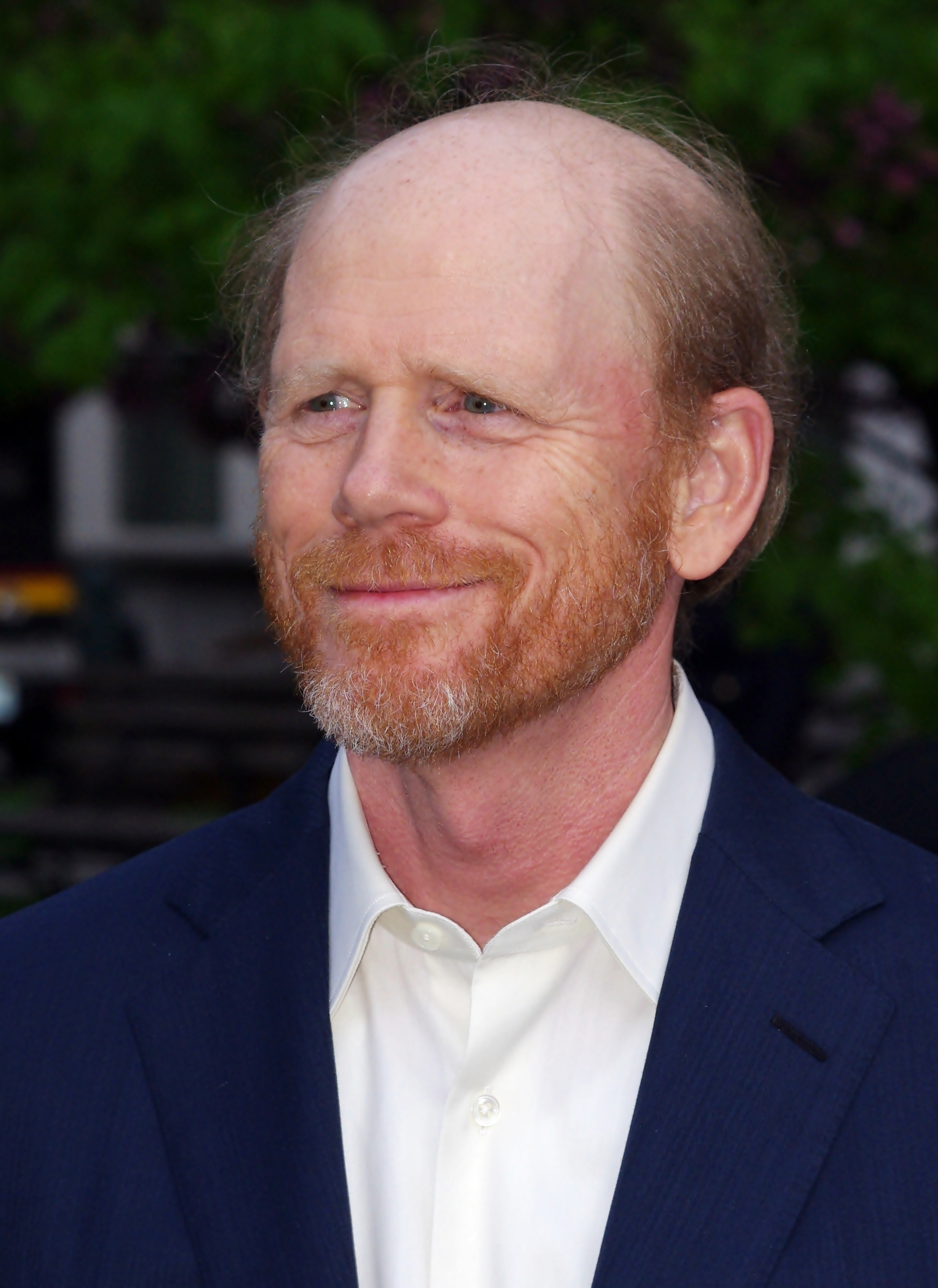
Director Ron Howard

It was announced in April 2020 that Ron Howard was to direct the film, with William Nicholson writing the screenplay. Metro-Goldwyn-Mayer acquired the rights to the film the following month. In March 2021, Viggo Mortensen, Colin Farrell and Joel Edgerton were among the cast announced to star in the film. Filming began on March 29, 2021, mostly done in Queensland with the support of Queensland and Gold Coast governments. Scenes depicting Chiang Rai Province were shot at lush tropical tree-lined roads, hotels and golf courses across Mudgeeraba, Yatala, Numinbah Valley and Carrara in Queensland. Two warehouses in Yatala were sourced for the production offices, as well as the construction of a custom-built water tank and cave interiors. The hospital scene was filmed at Griffith University Logan Campus.

The film's original score was composed by Benjamin Wallfisch. When Howard approached his usual collaborator Hans Zimmer for the score, the latter strongly recommended his protégé Benjamin Wallfisch for the job. Wallfisch had a 20-minute suite ready before Howard had started shooting in Thailand.

== Release ==
Thirteen Lives was released by United Artists Releasing in select theaters in the United States on July 29, 2022, before streaming on Amazon Prime Video on August 5. The film was originally scheduled for a fully theatrical release by United Artists Releasing on April 15, 2022, and was then postponed to November 18 (to contend during awards season) in response to the best test scores in MGM's history. In May 2022, however, the film was brought to its current release date due to Amazon's acquisition of MGM in March. Mortensen criticized the decision, given the film was considered an awards contender, and said, "I think Amazon could certainly have respected the deal, as they said they were going to, and released it widely in theaters and let it have its run. But they figured it would be more cost-effective if they didn't have to bother with spending money on promoting it and putting in theaters, and sharing that money with theaters, frankly. That's what it comes down to. To me, it's greed."

== Reception ==
On the review aggregator website Rotten Tomatoes, the film has an approval rating of 85% based on 182 reviews, with an average rating of 7.3/10. The website's consensus reads, "Steadily helmed by director Ron Howard, Thirteen Lives offers an incomplete but still gripping dramatization of an incredible true story." On Metacritic, the film has a weighted average score of 66 out of 100 based on 40 critics, indicating "generally favorable reviews".

== Accolades ==
| Award | Date of ceremony | Category | Recipient(s) | Result | Ref. |
|---|---|---|---|---|---|
| Black Reel Awards | February 6, 2023 | Outstanding Editing | James D. Wilcox | Nominated | |
| British Film Designers Guild Production Design Awards | February 18, 2023 | Best Production Design – International Studio Feature Film – Contemporary | Molly Hughes, Brandt Gordon, and Emma Rudkin | Won | |
| Cinema for Peace Awards | February 24, 2023 | Cinema for Peace Dove for The Most Valuable Film of the Year 2023 | Thirteen Lives | Nominated | |
| London Film Critics' Circle | February 5, 2023 | British Actor of the Year | Colin Farrell (Note: Also for After Yang, The Banshees of Inisherin and The Batman) | Nominated | |
| San Diego Film Critics Society | January 6, 2023 | Best Cinematography | Sayombhu Mukdeeprom | Nominated | |
| Visual Effects Society | February 15, 2023 | Outstanding Supporting Visual Effects in a Photoreal Feature | Jason Billington, Thomas Horton, Denis Baudin, Michael Harrison, Brian Cox | Won | |
