= Tham Luang cave rescue =

2018 international rescue mission in Thailand

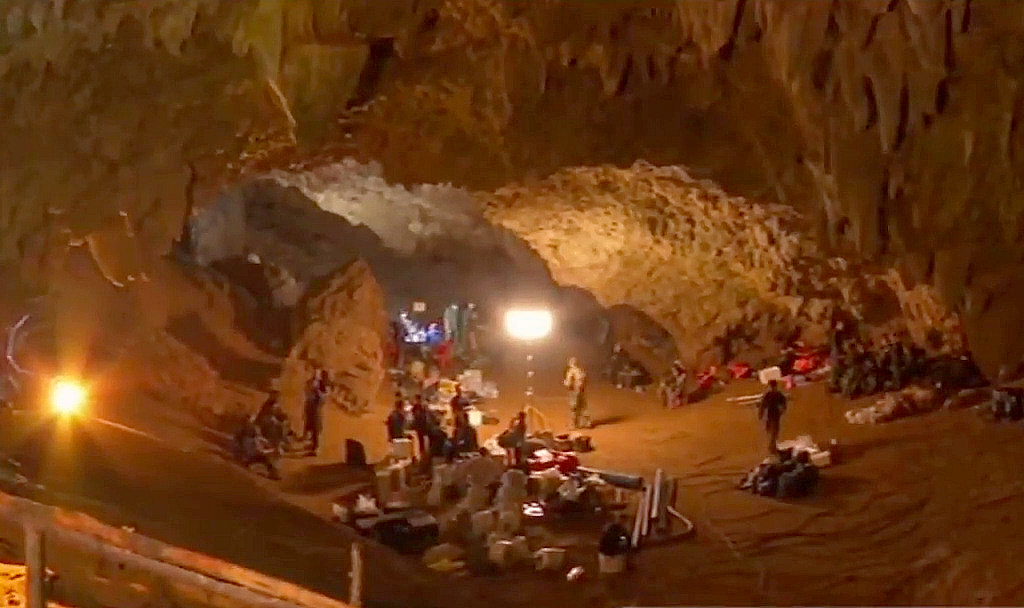
- Rescue personnel and equipment at the cave entrance
- Date: 23 June – 10 July 2018 (18 days)
- Location: Tham Luang Nang Non, Mae Sai, Chiang Rai province, Thailand; 20°22′54″N 99°52′06″E
- Type: Cave rescue
- Cause: Monsoon flooding
- Outcome: Group found alive on 2 July; all rescued between 8 and 10 July 2018
- Deaths: 2 (Note: One rescuer died one year after the incident as a consequence of a blood infection believed to have been contracted in the cave)
- Injuries: Minor scrapes and cuts, mild rashes, lung inflammation
- Location within Thailand

In June 2018, a junior football team became trapped in Tham Luang Nang Non, a cave system in Chiang Rai province, northern Thailand. Twelve members of the team, aged 11 to 16, and their 25-year-old assistant coach entered the cave on 23 June after a practice session. Shortly after they entered, heavy rainfall began and partially flooded the cave system, blocking their way out and trapping them deep within.

Efforts to locate the group were hampered by rising water levels and strong currents, and the team were out of contact with the outside world for more than a week. The cave rescue effort expanded into a massive operation amid intense worldwide public interest and involved international rescue teams. On 2 July, after advancing through narrow passages and muddy waters, British divers John Volanthen and Rick Stanton found the group alive on an elevated rock about 2 kilometres (1.2 mi) from the cave entrance.

Rescue organisers discussed various options for extracting the group, including whether to teach them basic underwater diving skills to enable the earliest possible rescue, to wait until a new entrance to the cave was found or drilled, or to wait for the floodwaters to subside by the end of the monsoon season several months later. The final strategy was for each boy to be fitted with an oxygen mask and sedated, then brought to the cave entrance by divers. After days of pumping water from the cave system and a respite from the rainfall, the rescue teams worked quickly to extract the group from the cave before the next monsoon rain, which was expected to bring additional downpours on 11 July. Between 8 and 10 July, all 12 boys and their coach were rescued from the cave by an international team.

The rescue effort involved as many as 10,000 people, including more than 100 divers, scores of rescue workers, representatives from about 100 governmental agencies, 900 police officers and 2,000 soldiers. Ten police helicopters, seven ambulances, more than 700 diving cylinders and the pumping of more than one billion liters (260,000,000 U.S. gal) of water from the caves were required.

Saman Kunan, a 37-year-old former Royal Thai Navy SEAL, died of asphyxiation on 6 July while returning to a staging base in the cave after delivering diving cylinders to the trapped group. The following year, in December 2019, rescue diver and Thai Navy SEAL Beirut Pakbara died of a blood infection contracted during the operation. Following the rescue, cave-diving was incorporated into the training regimen for Thailand's Navy SEALs to better prepare them for similar emergencies.

== Background and disappearance ==
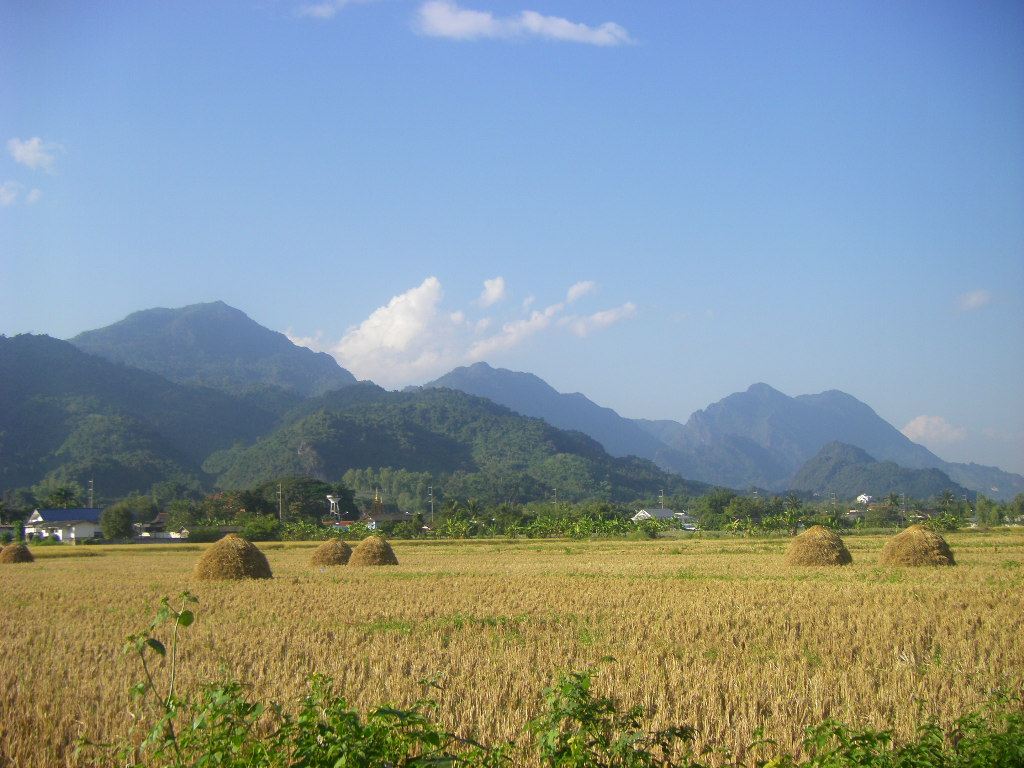
Doi Nang Non, known among Thais as the "Mountain of the Sleeping Lady". When viewed from this angle, it is said to resemble a woman lying on her back.

Tham Luang Nang Non is a karstic cave complex beneath Doi Nang Non, a mountain range on the border between Thailand and Myanmar. The cave system is 10 kilometres (6.2 mi) long and has many deep recesses, narrow passages and tunnels winding under hundreds of metres of limestone strata. Since part of the system is seasonally flooded, a sign advising against entering the caves during the rainy season (July to November) is posted at the entrance.

On Saturday 23 June 2018, a group of 12 boys aged between 11 and 16, from a local junior football team named the Wild Boars, and their 25-year-old assistant coach, Ekkaphon Kanthawong, went missing after exploring the caves. According to early news reports, they planned to have a birthday party in the cave after the football practice and spent a significant sum of money on food, but they denied this in a news conference after the rescue. The team was stranded in the tunnels by sudden and continuous rainfall after they had entered the cave system. They were forced to leave some food supplies behind when fleeing the rising water.

Thai news report from NBT news (no subtitles)

At around 7 pm that evening, the head coach and founder of the team, Nopparat Kanthawong (Thai: นพรัตน์ กัณฑะวงษ์), checked his phone and found about 20 missed calls from parents worried that their children had not returned. Nopparat dialled assistant coach Ekkaphon and a number of the boys, but he was unable to reach them. He eventually contacted Songpon Kanthawong, a 13-year-old member of the team who said that he had separated from the team after practice and that the rest of the boys had entered the Tham Luang caves. The coach raced to the caves, finding abandoned bicycles and bags near the entrance and water seeping from the muddy pathway. He alerted authorities to the missing group after seeing the team's unclaimed belongings.

== Team members ==
There were 12 children and one adult trapped in the cave, as follows:

Name (RTGS)	Thai Nickname	Age at time of rescue	Order rescued	Comments
Chanin Wibunrungrueang	Titan	11	11	
Phanumat Saengdi	Mick/Mig	13	5	
Duangphet Phromthep	Dom	13	8	Team captain. Died by suicide in the United Kingdom on 14 February 2023, aged 17.
Somphong Chaiwong	Pong	13	12	
Mongkhon Bunpiam	Mark	13	13	Stateless.
Natthawut Thakhamsong	Tern	14	2	
Ekkarat Wongsukchan	Biw/Bew	14	7	
Adul Sam-on	Dul	14	6	Communicated in English with the initial rescue divers. Stateless.
Prachak Sutham	Note	15	1	
Phiphat Phothi	Nick	15	3	
Phonchai Khamluang	Tee	16	10	Stateless.
Phiraphat Somphiangchai	Night	16–17	4	Cave visit was to celebrate his birthday.
Ekkaphon Kanthawong	Ekk/Eak/Ehk	25	9	Assistant coach and former monk. Stateless.

At the time of the rescue, the assistant coach and three of the boys had no nationality. Head coach Nopparat explained that they are from tribes in an area known as the "Golden Triangle", which extends across parts of Thailand, Myanmar, Laos and Southwestern China. This region has no clear borders and the people are not assigned passports. Their statelessness deprived them of basic benefits and rights, including the liberty to leave Chiang Rai province. "To get nationality is the biggest hope for the boys", head coach Nopparat said. "In the past, these boys have problems travelling to play matches outside of Chiang Rai because of their nationless status." Following the team's rescue, Thai officials promised to provide the three boys and the coach with legal assistance in obtaining Thai citizenship, a process that could take up to six months. The four were granted Thai citizenship on 26 September 2018.

== Search ==
External videos
- The first video released by Thai Navy SEALs showing the children and their coach after they were found by British volunteer divers

External images
- Map, from above, of the Tham Luang cave system, provided by BBC News
- Map, side view, of the Tham Luang cave system, provided by Deutsche Welle

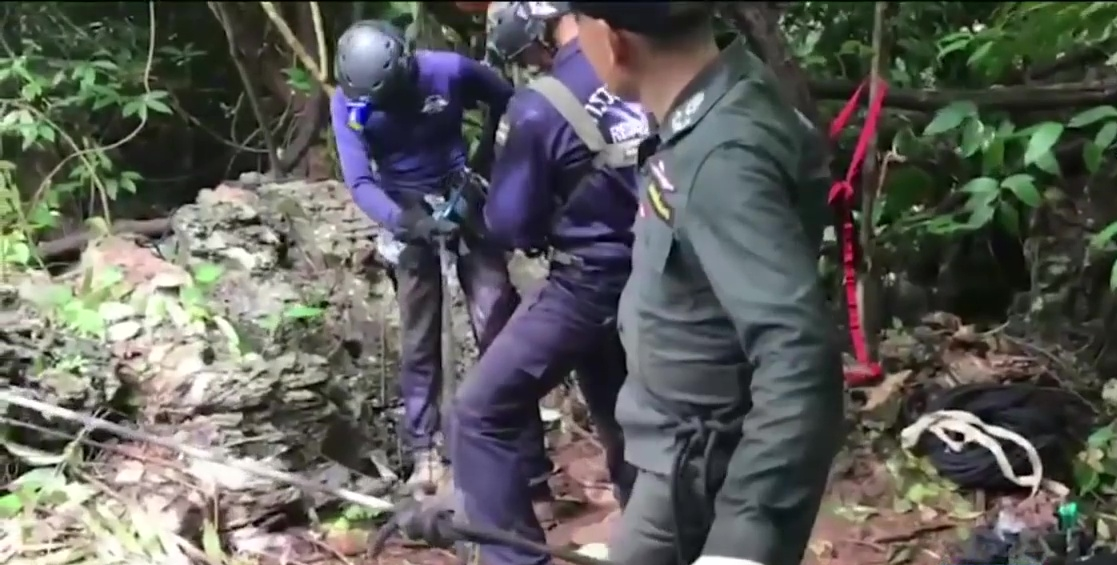
Rescuers looking for alternative access routes to the cave

British caver Vernon Unsworth, who lives in Chiang Rai and has knowledge of the cave complex, was scheduled to make a solo venture into the cave on 24 June when he received a call about the missing boys. Unsworth advised the Thai government to request assistance from the British Cave Rescue Council (BCRC). On 25 June, Thai Navy SEALs divers arrived and began searching the cave. A Thai Navy SEAL said the water was so murky that even with lights they could not see where they were going underwater. After continuous rain, which further flooded the entrance, the search had to be temporarily interrupted. On 27 June, three BCRC cave divers arrived with specialist equipment including HeyPhone radios, followed by separate teams of open-water divers. On 28 June, a United States Air Force team—reportedly United States Air Force Pararescuemen from the 320th Special Tactics Squadron, the 31st Rescue Squadron, and the 353rd Special Operations Group—joined them. By 29 June, an Australian Federal Police team of Specialist Response Group divers had arrived, followed by a Chinese team of divers from the Beijing Peaceland Foundation on Sunday, 1 July.

Meanwhile, policemen with sniffer dogs searched the surface above for shaft openings that could provide alternative entrances to the cave system below. Drones and robots were also used in the search, but no technology existed to scan for people deep underground.

BCRC divers Richard Stanton and John Volanthen advanced through the cave complex placing diving guidelines, supported by Thailand-based Belgian cave diver Ben Reymenants and French diver Maksym Polejaka. The search had to be suspended due to the weather, as rainfall increased the flow of water in the cave where the divers were battling strong currents and poor visibility. The search resumed on 2 July after the weather improved. The twelve boys and the coach were discovered at approximately 22:00 by Stanton and Volanthen, whose efforts were overseen from outside by BCRC diver Robert Harper. The boys and coach were on a narrow rock shelf about 400 metres (1,300 ft) beyond the "Pattaya Beach" chamber, named after an above-ground beach in Thailand. Volanthen had been placing guidelines in the cave to assist others in navigation when he ran out of line. He then swam to the surface and soon found the missing group, smelling them before hearing or seeing them. A video of the encounter, showing the boys and their interactions with the divers, was posted on Facebook by the Thai Navy SEALs. Former Chiang Rai provincial governor Narongsak Osatanakorn, who was in charge of rescue work, said, "We found them safe. But the operation isn't over." The Thai, US, Australian and Chinese diving teams supported by the BCRC divers began transporting diving bottles into the cave system and established an air supply storage area in Chamber 3.

On 3 July, the trapped group was joined by three Thai Navy SEALs who supported them until the rescue. The SEALs included Thai Army doctor Lt. Col. Pak Loharachun of the 3rd Medical Battalion, who had completed the Navy SEALs course. Thai officials told reporters that rescuers were providing health checks and treatment and keeping the boys entertained and that none of those trapped were in serious condition. "They have been fed with easy-to-digest, high-energy food with vitamins and minerals, under the supervision of a doctor", Rear Admiral Apagorn Youkonggaew, head of the Thai Navy's Special Forces, told reporters. A video made by the rescuers, and shared a few hours later by the Thai Navy SEALs, showed all twelve boys and their coach introducing themselves and stating their age. Wrapped in emergency blankets and appearing frail, they all said hello to the outside world. "Sawatdi khrap", each boy said with his palms together in wai, the traditional Thai greeting. A second video shows a medic treating them. It was believed that some of the group could not swim, complicating what would already be a difficult rescue. The Army doctor discovered that they had attempted to dig their way out of the cave. The team members had used rock fragments to dig every day, creating a hole five metres deep.

BCRC diver Jason Mallinson offered the boys and coach an opportunity to send messages to relatives by using his wet notes pad. Many of the notes said they were safe, reassured family members that everything was fine, and included words of love, reassurance and encouragement.

== Planning and preparation ==
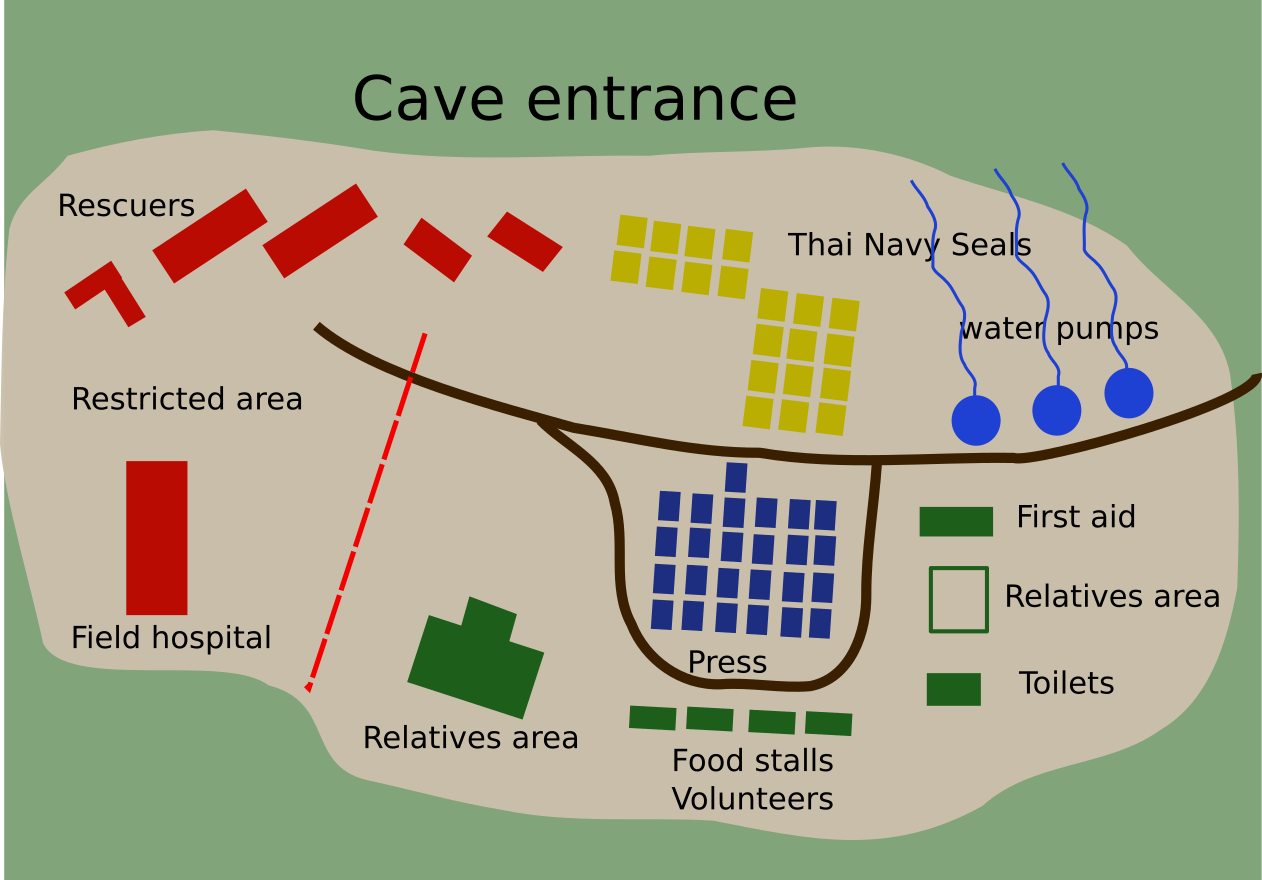
Rescue camp near Tham Luang cave

A logistics camp was established at the cave entrance, which accommodated hundreds of volunteers and journalists in addition to the rescue workers. The site was divided into several zones: restricted areas for the Thai Navy SEALs, other military personnel, and civilian rescuers; an area for the relatives to give them privacy; and areas for the press and the general public.

An estimated 10,000 people contributed to the rescue effort, including more than 100 divers, representatives from about 100 government agencies, 900 police officers, 2,000 soldiers and numerous volunteers. Equipment included ten police helicopters, seven police ambulances, and more than 700 diving cylinders, of which more than 500 were in the cave at any time while another 200 were in the queue to be refilled. More than a billion litres of water (the equivalent of 400 Olympic-size swimming pools) were removed.

=== Challenges ===
The place where the boys became stranded was about 2 kilometres (1.2 mi) from the entrance and 800–1,000 metres (2,600–3,300 ft) below the top of the mountain. The route to their location was blocked by several flooded sections, some with strong currents and zero visibility, and there were some extremely narrow parts, the smallest measuring only 38 by 72 centimetres (15 in × 28 in). The journey through the cave to reach the boys took six hours against the current and five hours to exit with the current, even for experienced divers.

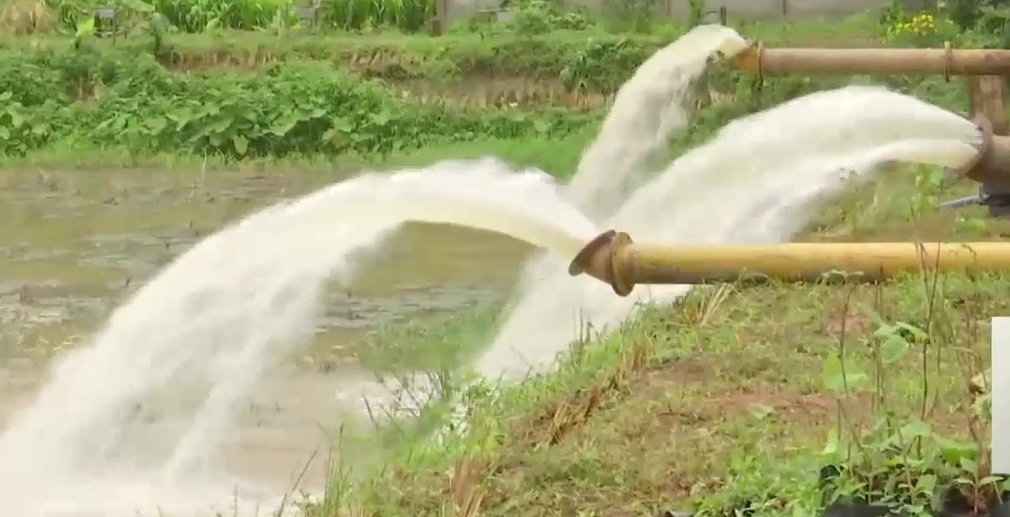
Pipes used to drain water from the cave and downstream lakes

The rescue workers battled rising water levels from the outset. In an effort to drain the cave, a stone diversion dam was built upstream, and systems were installed to pump water out of the cave and divert flows that were entering it. On 4 July, it was estimated that the pumps were removing 1,600,000 L/h (420,000 US gal/h) from the cave, ruining nearby farm fields in the process. For a time, well-meaning volunteers were inadvertently pumping water back into the groundwater supply. Helped by a spell of unseasonably dry weather, these efforts reduced water levels by 1.5 centimetres (0.6 in) per hour on 5 July, enabling the rescue teams to walk 1.5 kilometres (0.93 mi) into the cave. However, heavy rains forecast for 8 July were expected to halt or reverse the process and could even flood the position where the boys and their coach were trapped.

On 6 July, the oxygen level in the cave was detected to have dropped, raising fears that the boys might develop hypoxia if they remained there for a prolonged time. By 8 July, the oxygen level was measured to be 15%; the level needed to maintain normal function for humans is between 19.5% and 23.5%. Thai military engineers attempted to install an air supply line to the boys, but the effort was abandoned as impractical.

=== Options ===
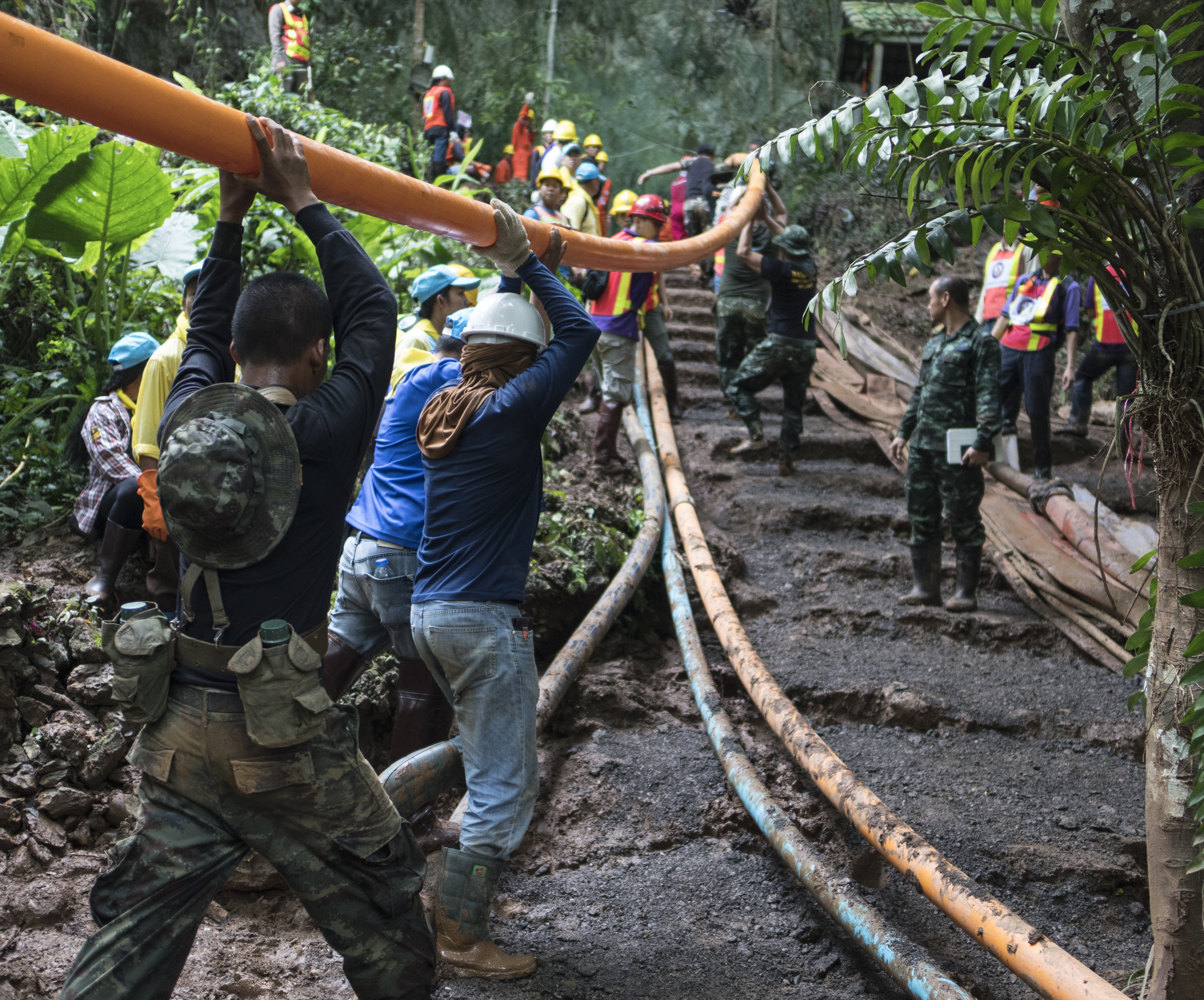
Thai rescue workers at the cave entrance positioning a pipe for water pumping on 2 July

As the crisis unfolded, rescuers planned several different methods to save the team and coach. The principal options were to:

- Wait until the end of the monsoon season; with divers providing food and water.
- Teach the group basic diving skills.
- Find an alternative entrance to the cave which could allow for an easier escape; one shaft was discovered that went down 900 metres.
- Drill a rescue shaft; more than 100 shafts were bored into the limestone, but no suitable location was found.

=== The diving option ===
Multiple dangers—the threat of more heavy rain, dropping oxygen levels, and the difficulty or impossibility of finding or drilling an escape passage—forced rescuers to make the decision to bring out the team and coach with experienced divers. The Thai Navy SEALs and US Air Force rescue experts met with the Thai Minister of the Interior who approved the plan. 90 divers worked in the cave system, 40 from Thailand and 50 from other countries. The media initially reported that the Thai military had said rescuers would teach the boys basic diving skills to enable them to make the journey. However this was quietly deemed too risky and instead the boys were fully sedated and were unconscious for the journey. Organisers built a mock-up of a tight passage with chairs, and divers practised with local boys in a school swimming pool. Thai SEALs and US Air Force experts then refined the plan to use teams of divers to bring out the weakened boys.

=== Rescue diver fatalities ===
Saman Kunan, a former Thai Navy SEAL, died during the rescue.

On 5 July, at 8:37 pm, Saman Kunan (Thai: สมาน กุนัน; born 23 December 1980), a 37-year-old former Thai Navy SEAL, made a dive from Chamber 3 to the T-junction close to Pattaya Beach to deliver three air tanks. During his return dive, he lost consciousness underwater. His dive buddy attempted CPR without success. Kunan was brought to Chamber 3 where CPR was attempted again, but he could not be resuscitated and was pronounced dead at about 1 am on 6 July.

Formerly a member of Thai Navy SEALs class 30, Kunan had left the SEALs in 2006 at the rank of petty officer 1st class; he was working in security at Bangkok's Suvarnabhumi Airport when he volunteered to assist with the cave rescue. He was posthumously promoted to lieutenant commander by the Commander-in-Chief of the Royal Thai Navy, an unprecedented rise of seven ranks. A funeral, sponsored and attended by the Thai royal family, was held on 14 July. On the same day, Kunan was awarded the Knight Grand Cross (first class) of the Most Exalted Order of the White Elephant by King Vajiralongkorn.

Another rescue diver and Thai Navy SEAL, Beirut Pakbara, died the following year from septic shock after acquiring an unspecified latent blood infection during the rescue operation.

== Rescue operation ==
On the morning of 8 July, officials instructed the media and all non-essential personnel around the cave entrance to clear the area as a rescue operation was imminent, due to the threat of monsoon rains later in the week, which were expected to flood the cave until October.

For the first part of the extraction, 18 rescue divers—13 international cave divers and five Thai Navy SEALs—were sent into the caves to retrieve the boys, with one "lead diver" to accompany each boy on the dive out. The international cave diving team was led by four British divers: John Volanthen, Richard Stanton, Jason Mallinson, and Chris Jewell (each assigned a boy in turn), and two Australians: Richard Harris, an anaesthetist, and his friend Craig Challen, a veterinarian. Irishman Jim Warny became an additional lead diver on the final day of the rescue to bring back assistant coach Ekkaphon, and physician Harris took over the lead rescue of Pong. The lead divers' portion of the journey would stretch over one kilometre, going through narrow, fully submerged passages. The remainder of the route was supported by 90 Thai and foreign divers at various points performing medical check-ups, resupply of air tanks, and other emergency roles.

There were conflicting reports about whether the boys were rescued from the cave in a weakest-to-strongest or strongest-to-weakest order. In reality, the sequence was determined by the boys themselves. "I talked with Dr. Harris. Everyone was strong and no one was sick," Ekkaphon told the press. "Everybody had a strong mental state. Dr. Harris said ... there's no preference." The team decided as a group that the boys who lived the farthest away should leave first. Ekkaphon also stated in their 18 July press conference, not realising at the time that their story had attracted global media attention: "We were thinking, when we get out of the cave, we would have to ride the bicycle home ... so the persons who live the furthest away would be allowed to go out first ... so that they can go out and tell everyone that we were inside, we were okay."

Each boy was dressed in a wetsuit, with a buoyancy control device, harness, and a positive pressure full-face mask. Harris administered the anaesthetic ketamine to the boys before the journey, rendering them "fully unconscious." This was to prevent them from panicking on the journey, which would risk their lives and those of their rescuers. They were also given the anti-anxiety drug alprazolam, and the drug atropine to steady their heart rates and reduce saliva production to prevent choking. A cylinder with 80% oxygen was clipped to their front, a handle was attached to their back, and they were each tethered to a diver in case they were lost in the poor visibility. The rescue divers described each child as "a package". The Thai government granted Harris and two medical assistants diplomatic immunity against judicial action, in case something went wrong.

The anaesthetic lasted between 45 minutes and one hour, requiring divers, whom Harris had trained, to administer "top-up" ketamine injections during the three-hour journey. Each boy was manoeuvred out by a swimming lead diver who held on by the back or chest—or towards his right or left side—depending on the guideline position; in narrow spots the diver could push the boy from behind. The boy was carefully navigated through tight passages to avoid dislodging his face mask against rocks. The diver kept his head higher than the boy's, so that in poor visibility it would be his own head that hit any obstacles first. The diver ensured that the boy remained breathing by checking for exhaust bubbles, which he could see and feel.

After completing the restricted first dive and arriving at a dry section, the lead diver transferred the boy to three support rescue divers. The boy's dive gear was removed and the boy was transported on a drag stretcher over 200 m (660 ft) of rocks and sand hills. Craig Challen performed a medical assessment, and the boy's dive gear was put back on before being re-submerged for the next section. The boys arrived at 45-minute intervals.

After being delivered by the divers into the staging base in Chamber 3, the boys were passed along a "daisy chain" by hundreds of rescuers stationed along the treacherous path out of the cave. Wrapped in "sked" rescue stretchers, the boys were alternately carried, slid and zip-lined along a complex arrangement of pulleys installed by rock climbers. Many areas from Chamber 3 to the entrance of the cave were still partially submerged and rescuers described having to transport the boys over slippery rocks and through muddy water for hours. The journey from Chamber 3 to the cave entrance had initially taken about four to five hours, but this was reduced to less than an hour after a week of draining and clearing the mud path using shovels.

The authorities warned that the extraction would take several days to complete because crews had to replace air tanks, gear, and other supplies, requiring ten to twenty hours between each run. Shortly after 19:00, local officials confirmed that two of the boys had been rescued and taken to Chiangrai Prachanukroh Hospital. Shortly afterwards, two more boys exited the cave and were assessed by medical officials. Low water levels had reduced the time required for the rescues. The lower water was due to improved weather and the construction of a weir outside the cave to help control the water.

On 9 July, four more boys were rescued from the cave. On 10 July, the last four boys and their coach were rescued from the cave. The rescue procedure was streamlined with practice, so the total time to extract a boy was reduced from three hours on the first day to just over two hours on the final day, allowing four boys and the coach to be rescued. The three Thai Navy SEALs and the Army doctor who had stayed with the boys the entire time were the last to dive out. Three of these divers made it to Chamber 3, joining waiting rescuers when the pumps shut off for an uncertain reason, possibly due to a burst water pipe. The water levels in Chamber 3 started to rise, which would have cut off their access to the first two chambers and the cave entrance. "All of a sudden a water pipe burst and the main pump stopped working," a diver stated. "We really had to run from the third chamber to the entrance because the water level was rising very quickly—like 50 cm every 10 minutes." This forced up to 100 rescuers still located more than 1.5 kilometres (0.93 mi) inside the cave to evacuate in a hurry, abandoning the rescue equipment inside the cave. The last diver made it back to Chamber 3 as everyone was preparing to leave. The rescuers managed to rush to the cave exit in under an hour.

A number of news outlets reported on the role of assistant coach Ekkaphon during the rescue. Previously a Buddhist monk, he had calmed the boys by guiding them in meditation during the ordeal. He also passed on a message in which he apologised for putting the children in danger.

=== Recovery ===
Thai authorities reported that the rescued boys were able to eat rice porridge, but more complex foods would be withheld for ten days. The Thai Health Ministry said the boys had lost an average of 2 kilograms (4.4 lb) each, but they were in "good condition". They were placed in quarantine while health workers determined whether they had caught any infectious diseases, and they were expected to remain hospitalised for at least one week. Because of the prolonged stay in a damp cave environment, officials were worried about potential infections such as histoplasmosis or leptospirosis. Parents of the team members initially visited their children by looking through a window, but as soon as laboratory results proved negative, they were allowed to visit in person while wearing a medical gown, face mask and hair cap.

The boys wore sunglasses as a precaution while their eyes adjusted to the daylight. Detailed tests of their eyes, nutrition, mental health and blood were carried out. A Health Ministry physician said all the boys showed an increase in white blood cells, so preventive antibiotic doses were given to the entire team.

== Responses ==
=== Local ===
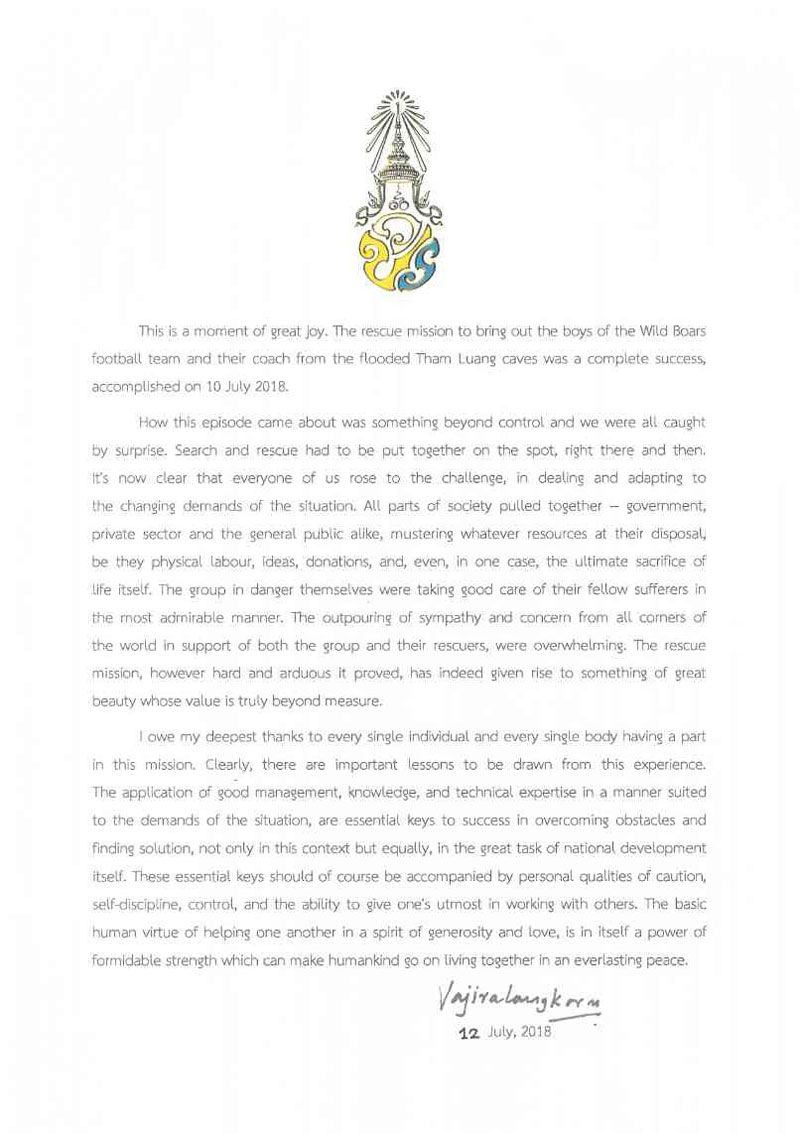
In this letter, King Vajiralongkorn gives thanks to the people who participated in the rescue.

Residents of Chiang Rai province volunteered to cook, clean for, and otherwise support the missing team's families and the rescue teams at the encampment by the cave mouth. Social media was used to draw attention to the rescue attempts. Classmates and teachers of the team spent time chanting and praying for the missing boys. Classmates of one of the boys made 1,000 paper cranes for him, while praying for his safe return. Local schools donated money to help the parents with living costs, as many of them stopped working in order to follow the rescue attempts.

On 29 June, Prime Minister Prayut Chan-o-cha visited the search site and told the families of the boys not to give up hope. Following the death of Saman Kunan, King Vajiralongkorn announced that he would sponsor his funeral.

After the rescue was completed, the boys' families, the rescue commander, military officials, and thousands of volunteers gathered at the cave entrance. The group gave thanks for the lives saved and asked forgiveness from the cave goddess "Jao Mae Tham" for the intrusion of pumps, ropes and people during the rescue.

==== Opinions about the assistant coach ====
Some observers, primarily in Western media, questioned whether assistant coach Ekkaphon Kanthawong should face criminal charges for leading the group into the caves, despite the warning sign at the entrance stating that it is dangerous to enter between July and November. The boys had entered the cave on 23 June.

Local communities, as well as the boys' parents, emphasised that they did not blame the boys or their coach, as the rain had arrived a month earlier than usual. Vernon Unsworth said "Nobody's to blame, not the coach, not the boys. They were just very unlucky … It wasn't just the rain that day, the mountain is like a sponge and waters from earlier rain were raising the levels." Unsworth said that he himself had been planning to make a solo venture into the complex on 24 June, when he received a telephone call saying the boys were missing there.

While the police chief told newspaper Khaosod that he "hadn't ruled out" pressing negligence charges against the coach for putting the team in danger, no calls were made to take legal action against him. A number of lawyers stated that the coach would probably not face criminal charges, since Thai law also takes into consideration whether a person has malicious intent. In mainstream media, Ekkaphon has widely been held "a hero" and was a "calm voice [that] helped boys to beat despair in the darkness." The coach was reported to have treated the boys with care, giving them his food, helping them remain calm, and instructing them to drink the relatively clean water dripping from the cave walls instead of the murky floodwaters that trapped them.

When asked if Ekkaphon should be held legally responsible for negligence, Mongkhon Bunpiam, the father of 12-year-old Mongkhon, rejected the suggestion: "We would never do that … the boys love their coach … and we as parents don't want it either. Coach Eak has been good to my boy, and now I hear how he gave them hope, and kept them calm for so many days without food. I have great admiration for him." Tanawut Vibulrungruang, father of 11-year old Chanin, was reported to be "touched by the actions of the team's coach. Without him … he doesn't know how the kids could have survived." Head coach Nopparat said he would not have approved of the hike, but was confident in Ekkaphon's ability to take care of the boys. Prime Minister Prayut said that the emphasis should be on the rescue and the recovery of the team, and he asked the public to avoid a rush to judgment.

=== International ===
Over the course of two weeks, hundreds of volunteers, military specialists and corporate experts arrived from around the world to offer assistance in the rescue.

- Australia: Six Australian Federal Police (AFP) Specialist Response Group divers, one Navy Clearance diver, one Australian Medical Assistance Team (AUSMAT) member and Department of Foreign Affairs and Trade Crisis Response Team officers. Up to 20 Australians were involved at the cave site. Doctor Richard Harris, an anaesthetist, was part of the medical team that determined the boys' fitness to make the 2-kilometre (1.2 mi) journey. Harris and his diving partner, retired veterinarian Doctor Craig Challen, both cave diving specialists, played key roles in the rescue. The Thai government provided Harris with diplomatic immunity to protect him in case anything went wrong with the sedation.
- Belgium: Ben Reymenants, the owner of a diving school in Phuket, contributed in cave diving capacity.
- Canada: Erik Brown, a dive instructor from Vancouver, participated on the cave diving team.
- China: A six-man team from the volunteer rescue organisation, the Beijing Peaceland Foundation, arrived on 29 June. The team brought rescue equipment including an underwater robot, diving equipment and a three-dimensional imager. A second Chinese team arrived on 30 June from the Green Boat Emergency Rescue organisation with expertise in search and rescue on mountains and in caves.
- Czech Republic: The government of the Czech Republic offered to provide a Czech manufacturer's high-performance pumps; the state has four such pumps, each with an output of 400 litres per second (1,440,000 L/h (380,000 US gal/h)). Upon inspection at the site, however, it was determined that heavy-duty pumps could not be used because of the unsuitable terrain.
- Denmark: Two Danish divers participated in the cave diving team: Ivan Karadžić, who runs a diving center, and Claus Rasmussen, a diving instructor.
- Finland: Diver Mikko Paasi assisted with the rescue efforts.
- France: Diver Maksym Polejaka assisted with the rescue efforts.
- Ireland: Diver Jim Warny assisted with the rescue efforts.
- India: Experts from the pump manufacturer Kirloskar Brothers provided technical advice on drainage and pumps.
- Israel: Diver Rafael Aroush joined the diving team, and emergency mobile communication devices were donated by Maxtech NetWorks.
- Japan: Divers and engineers, including Shigeki Miyake, a drainage specialist from the Japan International Cooperation Agency in Thailand, assisted in efforts to pump water out of the cave.
- Laos: Members of the Vientiane Rescue contributed to the search and rescue efforts.
- Netherlands: Drainage specialists were sent to aid water pumping efforts.
- New Zealand: Diver Ross Schnauer assisted with the rescue efforts.
- Russia: Ministry of Emergency Situations readied a volunteer team including a rescue specialist.
- Ukraine: Divers Vsevolod Korobov and Maksym Polejaka assisted with the rescue efforts.
- United Kingdom: The British Cave Rescue Council sent eight experienced cave rescue divers, some familiar with caves in Thailand, to lead the diving team; as well as three cave rescue personnel and special equipment. Vernon Unsworth, a British man living in the area, was the first person with caving expertise to arrive at the site. John Volanthen and Rick Stanton discovered the boys and led the cave diving team. Chris Jewell and Jason Mallinson brought 500 kilograms (1,100 lb) of diving equipment. Other divers involved included Connor Roe and Josh Bratchley; cave rescue personnel, Mike Clayton and Gary Mitchell, provided surface control for the divers, along with Robert Harper who had initially deployed among the first three UK divers. Tim Acton deployed as a friend of the Thai Navy SEALs.
- United States: On 28 June, the US military's Indo-Pacific Command (USINDOPACOM) deployed 36 personnel from Okinawa, including airmen from 353rd Special Operations Group and the 31st Rescue Squadron. According to Military.com, they joined seven other personnel, including a member of Joint US Military Advisory Group Thailand. Pentagon spokesperson Colonel Rob Manning said that US personnel had "staged equipment and prepared the first three chambers of the cave for safe passage. The US contingent assisted in transporting the evacuees through the final chambers of the system, and provided medical personnel and other technical assistance to the rescue efforts."

Volunteers, teams and technical specialists from countries including Germany, Myanmar, the Philippines, Singapore, Spain, Sweden, and Ukraine, also participated in the operation. France offered to send a team of specialists and equipment, but Thai authorities believed that adequate resources were already on site.

The ordeal captured the attention of media from around the world. Over a period of three weeks, articles relating to the incident dominated the top stories section at many major news publications. Following the completion of the rescue, Malaysian prime minister Mahathir Mohamad conveyed his congratulations, on behalf of Malaysians, to everyone involved in the brave operation to save those trapped in Chiang Rai.

==== Sports world ====
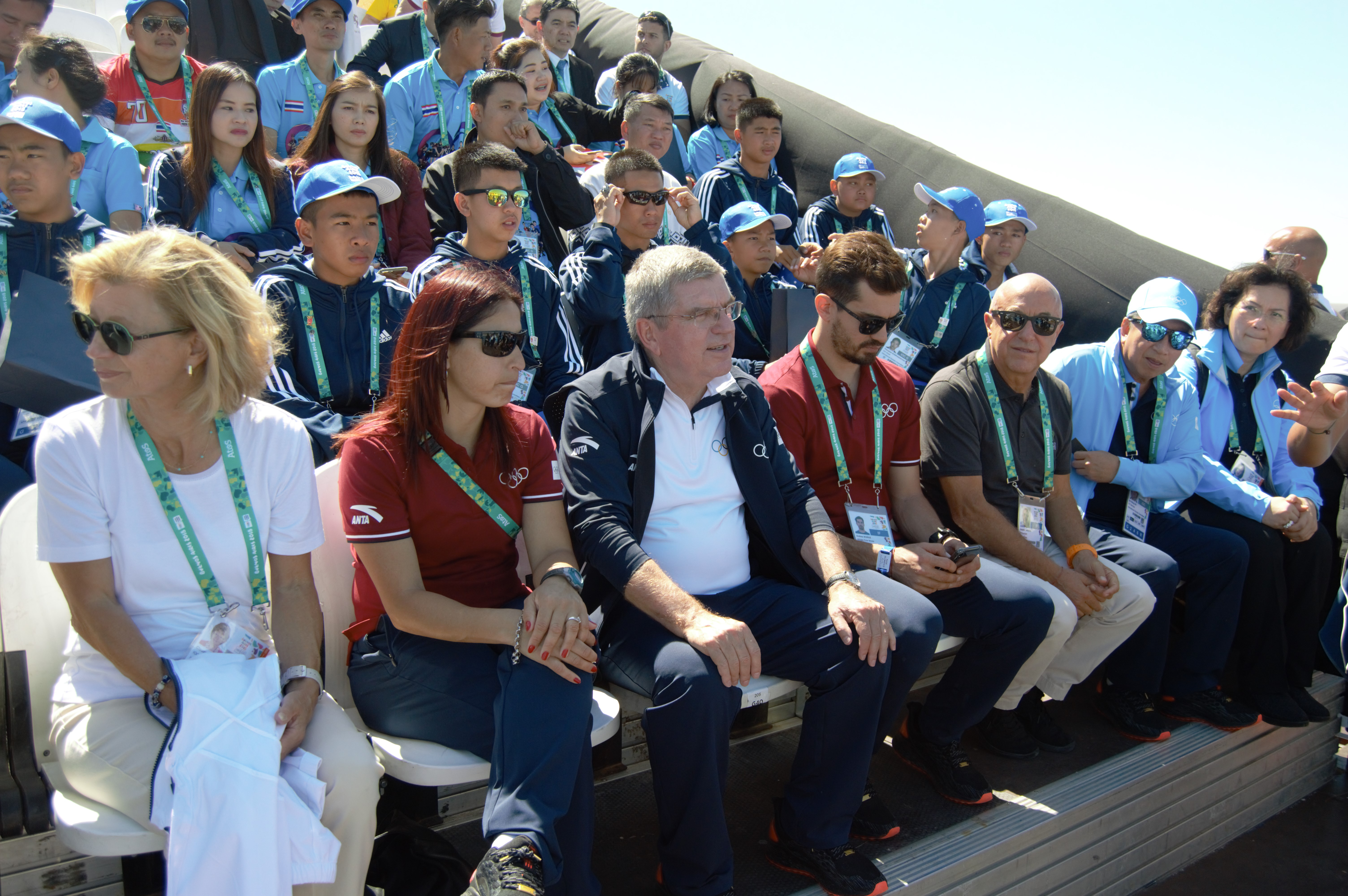
The Wild Boars with Thomas Bach at the 2018 Summer Youth Olympics

FIFA president Gianni Infantino invited the children and coach to attend the 2018 World Cup final (on 15 July), if circumstances allowed. However, as the entire team was hospitalised for at least a week, they were only able to watch the match on television. FC Barcelona invited the team to play in their international academy tournament in 2019 and to watch a first-team game at their home stadium, Camp Nou. England and Manchester City defender Kyle Walker offered to send football shirts to the team, having noticed that one of the rescued boys was wearing a Three Lions jersey. In October 2018, the boys travelled to the UK as guests at Old Trafford to attend a Manchester United home match against Everton in the Premier League. The boys were invited by the International Olympic Committee to the opening ceremony of the 2018 Summer Youth Olympics in Buenos Aires.

==== Elon Musk ====
On 7 July, Elon Musk stated that engineers from SpaceX and the Boring Company planned to build a "tiny, kid-sized submarine" made from the liquid oxygen transfer tube from the Falcon 9 rocket. The submarine would be light enough to be carried by two divers while being robust and small enough to fit through the narrow gaps. Later that day, Musk mentioned that construction on the submarine was complete and that it was being shipped to Thailand. Rick Stanton purportedly emailed Musk stating "It is absolutely worth continuing with the development of this system in as timely a manner as feasible. If the rain holds it out it may well be used." However, Stanton, through a spokesman, dismissed the plausibility of the submarine due to the cave being too narrow.

Elon Musk
(@elonmusk)
tweeted:

Replying to @zeynep

You know what, don't bother showing the video. We will make one of the mini-sub/pod going all the way to Cave 5 no problemo. Sorry pedo guy, you really did ask for it.

15 July 2018

By 9 July, Musk had arrived at the rescue site and visited Cave 3. He commented that the "mini-sub" was ready if needed and that it would be left in Thailand should it be needed for the rescue or for future events. However, the submarine was not used during the rescue. Additionally the local governor, Narongsak Osotthanakorn, stated that it was "not practical", to which Musk responded that the governor was not a subject matter expert and mentioned the previous emails by Rick Stanton. Vern Unsworth, who helped get the attention of British cave rescue divers, ridiculed the "mini-sub" as a public relations stunt and suggested in a CNN interview that Musk "stick his submarine where it hurts". In retaliation for this, Musk falsely accused Unsworth of paedophilia, and hired a private investigator in an attempt to discredit him. Musk issued a public apology to Unsworth after Unsworth unsuccessfully sued him for defamation.

== Timeline ==
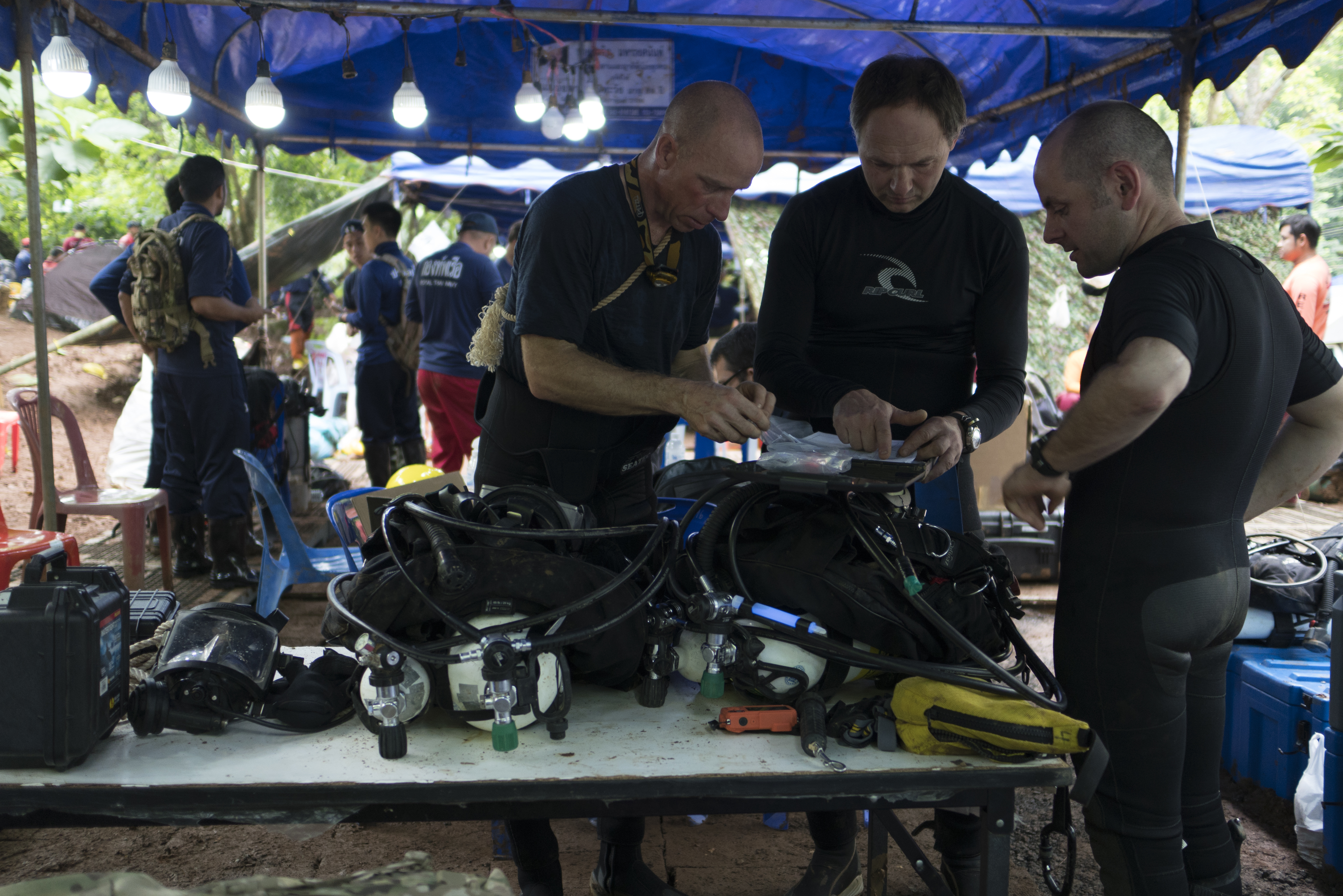
International cave divers preparing their diving gear on 2 July

- 23 June 2018: The team enters the Tham Luang cave shortly after football practice and prior to heavy rain. The mother of one of the boys later reports to local police that her son is missing after he has failed to arrive home. When rumours begin to spread about the boys going into the Tham Luang cave, the police investigate and find shoes and bicycles near the cave entrance.
- 24 June 2018: Handprints and footprints of the boys are found by officials. A vigil is held outside the cave by relatives.
- 25 June 2018: Thai Navy SEAL divers enter the cave to search for the team.
- 26 June 2018: Having arrived at a T-junction, divers are pushed back by floodwaters that have blocked an elevated air pocket near Pattaya Beach where it is believed the team may have been stranded.
- 27 June 2018: British and US military teams of divers and experts are sent to Thailand to help with the search. Divers re-enter the cave system but quickly retreat due to another flooding.
- 28 June 2018: Heavy rains cause the rescue operation to stop temporarily. Pumps are delivered to drain the water. Drones are dispatched to assist more than 600 people in their search for new vents in the cave roof.
- 29 June 2018: Thai Prime Minister Prayut Chan-o-cha visits the site.
- 30 June 2018: The search resumes after divers take advantage of a brief pause in the rainfall. They advance further but are still far from where they believe the boys to be stranded.
- 1 July 2018: As divers go deeper into the cave, they use Chamber 3 as an operating base to store diving cylinders and other supplies which are replenished by support divers transiting back and forth to the cave entrance.
- 2 July 2018: At around 8:20 pm, the boys and their coach are found alive on elevated land, 400 m (1,300 ft) further than Pattaya Beach. They are discovered by the British diving team, including Richard Stanton and John Volanthen. Communication is difficult as Adul Sam-on is the only English speaker.
- 3 July 2018: Seven Thai Navy SEAL divers deliver food, medicine and supplies to the boys, including high-calorie gels and paracetamol. Four of the divers, including Doctor Pak Loharnshoon, volunteer to stay with the boys inside the cave for a week until all 12 can be extracted. The four divers will be the last people to exit the cave after the rescue is completed.
- 4 July 2018: The team is taught how to use a full-face diving mask and breathing apparatus. Rescue teams work on continuing to pump water from the cave; at this stage, they have already pumped out over 110,000 m^{3} (30 million US gal).
- 5 July 2018: The rescue is forced to move more quickly because of expected rain. Another group searches the mountains for any new cracks or openings.
- 6 July 2018: Saman Kunan, a former Thai Navy SEAL diver and volunteer of the rescue mission, dies in the early hours of the morning after losing consciousness while placing diving cylinders underwater along the route to the stranded boys. Authorities urge that the rescue needs to speed up, as the oxygen levels are falling to 15%, well below the 21% "safe zone".
- 7 July 2018: The rescue chief claims that it is not suitable for the team to dive yet. More than 100 vents are being drilled in a third attempt to reach the team. A letter from the team's coach reaches the outside, apologising to the boys' parents, along with letters from the boys to their parents.
- 8 July 2018: An international contingent of 13 specialist divers and five Thai Navy SEALs, including four British and two Australian divers, enters the cave to begin bringing the boys to safety. Since the most difficult parts of the passage are too narrow for more than one rescuer, each boy is assigned as the responsibility of a single rescue diver. Adding to each solo rescuer's challenge is that, in order to prevent underwater panic and to eliminate body movements that would endanger the rescue, each child is put under anaesthesia just prior to being extricated. So, in addition to manipulating the boy through narrow cave sumps, the diver also has to monitor the consciousness and breathing of a medical patient. The first boy is reported to have emerged from the cave at about 5:40 pm, and the fourth at about 7:50 pm, though not all sources agree. The four boys are taken to Chiang Rai Prachanukroh, a local hospital. It is announced that divers will not resume the rescue for at least another 10 hours, as they need to replenish supplies.
- 9 July 2018: Four more boys are confirmed to have been extracted from the cave and transported to the hospital. It is announced that the boys will be kept in quarantine.
- 10 July 2018: The remaining four boys and their coach are rescued. It is later confirmed that all of the rescue divers have also successfully exited the cave.
- December 2019: Thai Navy SEAL Beirut Pakbara dies from a blood infection contracted during the cave rescue.

== Legacy ==
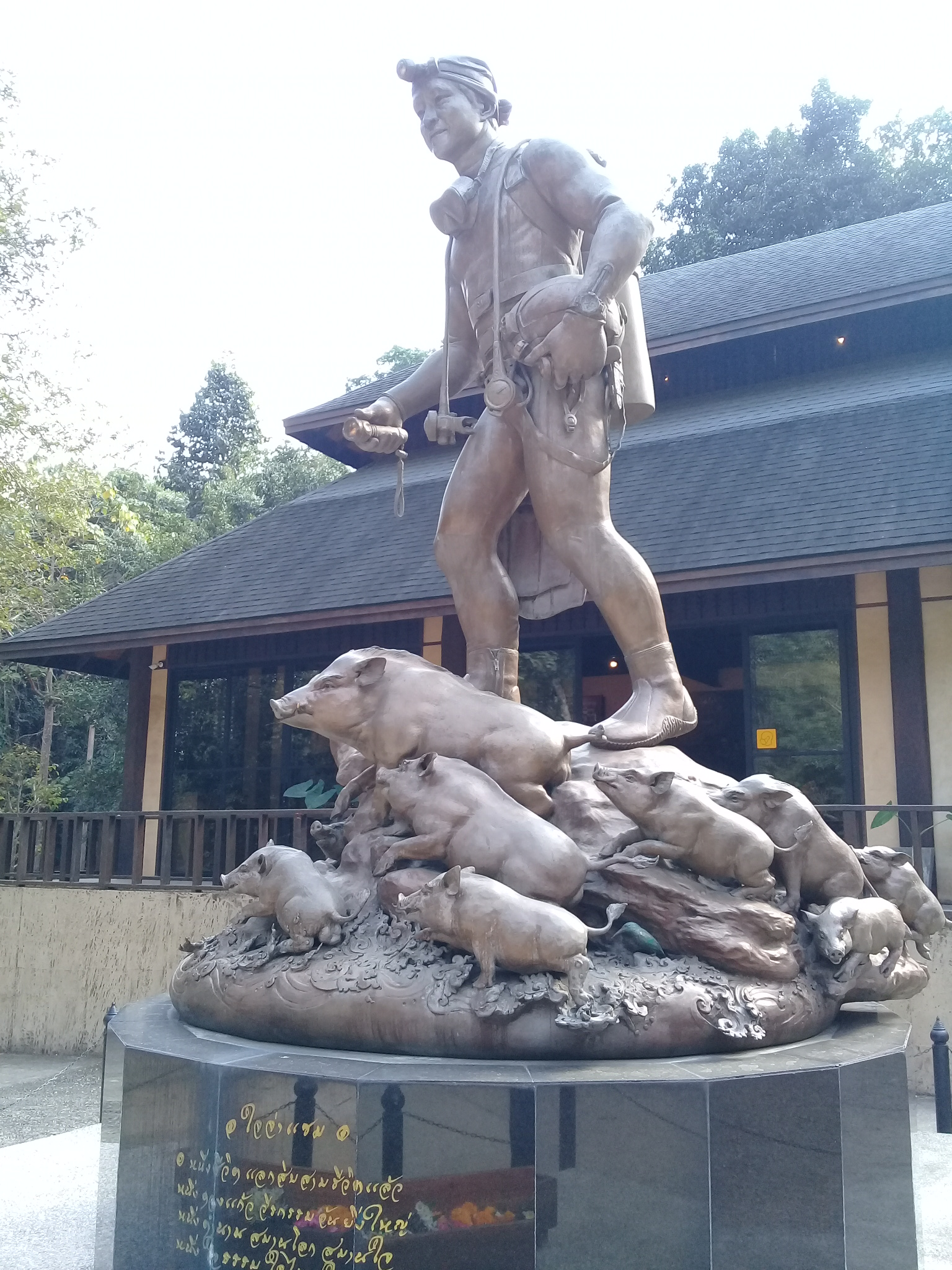
Monument for Saman Kunan at Tham Luang. The boys' team was called "The Wild Boars".

When the rescue operation was concluded, the Tham Luang Nang Non cave and adjacent forest park were immediately closed to the public. Realising the massive tourism potential, the Thai authorities announced plans to turn the cave into a living museum to showcase the multinational rescue effort. The head of the rescue mission and former governor of Chiang Rai province, Narongsak Osatanakorn, predicted that the area was set to become a "major attraction for Thailand", and the deputy head of national parks, Chongklai Woraponsathron, said "we are lucky that we are going to have a world class tourist attraction". However, Prime Minister Prayut highlighted the concerns for tourist safety and stated that the cave was "dangerous", insisting that the site could not be reopened until adequate precautions had been implemented to safeguard visitors. Prior to the 2018 cave rescue, the area was largely undeveloped and had limited facilities for tourists.

To honour those involved in the rescue operation, a mural was created by a team of local artists. It first went on display at Wat Rong Khun, a Buddhist temple in Chiang Rai province, before being moved to a memorial pavilion near the Tham Luang cave entrance in December 2018. Saman Kunan, the former Thai Navy SEAL who died during the rescue operation, is commemorated with a twice life-size bronze statue situated in front of the memorial pavilion. Designed by renowned national artist Chalermchai Kositpipat and produced at a fine art foundry in Thailand's Ayutthaya province, the statue depicts Kunan with 13 wild boars at his feet, symbolising the 12 boys and their football coach.

After the forest park was reopened on 16 November 2018, thousands of tourists flocked to the site, but they were not allowed inside the cave as work was under way on creating a living museum dedicated to the rescue. The cave was officially opened to the public 12 months later, on 1 November 2019, in an inauguration ceremony attended by monks, Thai government officials and forest rangers. This was the first time since the rescue that tourists had been allowed to enter the cave itself, although there was a limit of twenty people at a time, and they were only permitted to visit the main entrance cavern. At around the same time, Tham Luang was upgraded from a forest park to a national park in view of its enhanced status as a tourist hotspot. Forestry officials said that prior to the rescue, around 40,000 tourists had visited the area each year, but more than 1 million had visited since the park reopened the previous November.

On 24 June 2023, a ceremony was held in front of the Tham Luang cave to mark the fifth anniversary of the search and rescue mission. The cave system was then reopened in phases for public access and adventure tourism. The first two chambers were opened to the public in July 2023, with large groups guided as far as Chamber 1 multiple times a day, while smaller groups could visit Chamber 2 on pre-booked guided tours. Limited tours to the third chamber, which served as the hub of the rescue operation, began in December 2023. Accompanied by licensed tour guides, small numbers of tourists can experience the obstacles encountered by the rescue teams and understand the extremely complicated rescue work that was carried out in July 2018. The equipment used by the divers, including ropes, cables and oxygen tubes, remains untouched as exhibits for the visitors to view for themselves. The area after Chamber 3 remains closed to the public, but there are plans to open it up further in the future for more experienced cavers to explore. Back at the cave entrance, display boards give details of the rescue operation, and some of the bicycles are still standing where the boys left them on the day they entered the cave.

Following the rescue, cave-diving was incorporated into the training regime for Thailand's Navy SEALs to better prepare them for similar emergencies. As three of the boys and their assistant coach were stateless, officials promised that the four would be granted Thai citizenship within six months, and this happened on 26 September 2018. The Thai government vowed to end statelessness by 2024.

== Media ==
=== Books ===
- Aquanaut: A Life Beneath The Surface – The Inside Story of the Thai Cave Rescue (2021) by Rick Stanton
- Thirteen Lessons that Saved Thirteen Lives: The Thai Cave Rescue (2021) by John Volanthen
- Against All Odds by Craig Challen and Richard Harris
- All Thirteen – a 2020 non-fiction children's book by American author Christina Soontornvat. It received positive reviews from critics and was awarded a Newbery Honor and a Sibert Honor in 2021.
- The Boys in the Cave (2018) by Matt Gutman
- The Great Cave Rescue (2018) by James Massola
- The Art of Risk (2023) by Richard Harris
- Titan and the Wild Boars: The True Cave Rescue of the Thai Soccer Team (2019) illustrated children's book by Susan Hood and Pathana Sornhiran illustrated by Dow Phumiruk
- Sukellus valoon (2018) by Mikko Paasi and Johanna Elomaa, this book is only in Finnish language

=== Film and television ===
- 2018: Against The Elements: Tham Luang Cave Rescue, a documentary with exclusive interviews, produced by Channel News Asia in Singapore.
- 2018: Thai Cave Rescue, an episode of science television series Nova (season 45, episode 14).
- 2019: The Cave, a feature film written and directed by Thai-Irish filmmaker Tom Waller. Features many of the real-life cave divers as themselves.
- 2019: Thai Cave Rescue, an episode of the National Geographic television series Drain the Oceans (season 2, episode 12). Unveils post-rescue lidar scans of the cave topology.
- 2019: 13 Lost: The Untold Story of the Thai Cave Rescue
- 2021: The Rescue, a National Geographic documentary released on 8 October 2021. Makes use of body-cam footage recorded by the divers involved in the operation.
- 2022: Thirteen Lives, an Amazon Original film directed by Ron Howard with screenplay by William Nicholson, released in theatres in July 2022 and on Amazon Prime in August 2022. Filming began in Queensland, Australia in March 2021.
- 2022: Thai Cave Rescue, a Netflix limited series released on 22 September 2022. The only dramatic production granted access to members of the Wild Boars.
- 2022: The Trapped 13: How We Survived The Thai Cave, a Netflix documentary released on 5 October 2022. Features interviews with selected members of the Wild Boars team.

=== Song ===
A song about the rescue, "Heroes of Thailand" was written on 16 July 2018 by British music producer Will Robinson, with English and North Thailand dialect lyrics and was performed by the Isan Project featuring Ronnarong Khampha.

== Awards ==
- Australia: On 24 July 2018, the Governor-General of Australia awarded the Bravery Medal to the six AFP Special Response Group divers and the Navy Clearance diver who supported the diving operation in the cave for "having displayed considerable bravery". Dr. Richard Harris and Craig Challen were awarded the Star of Courage for "having displayed conspicuous courage". All nine were awarded the Medal of the Order of Australia (OAM) for "service to the international community through their specialist response roles". On 25 January 2019, Challen and Harris were named Australians of the Year.
- Belgium: On 22 November 2018, Belgian diver Jim Warny was made a Knight of the Order of Leopold for his rescue efforts.
- China: On 18 July 2018, the Thai Ambassador to Beijing hosted a luncheon for the Beijing Peaceland Foundation and Green Boat Emergency Rescue organisation.
- Thailand:
  - On 13 July 2018, the Commander-in-Chief of the Royal Thai Navy, in a letter of commendation, posthumously promoted former Navy SEAL Saman Kunan, who had died on 6 July, to Lieutenant Commander, and on 14 July, King Vajiralongkorn awarded him with the Knight Grand Cross of the Most Exalted Order of the White Elephant. Commander of the Navy SEALs, Rear Admiral Apakorn Youkongkaew, and Navy SEAL Special Captain Anan Surawan, Commander of the First Special Warfare Corps, were cited in the letter of commendation by the Commander-in-Chief for their "outstanding performance, which sets the best example for others in the Thai Navy to follow". RADM Youkongkaew had commanded the overall activities of all divers during the operation and CAPT Surawan had commanded the operational center in Chamber 3. The commendation stated that 127 current and former Navy SEAL members and a 32-member medical team had participated in the rescue.
  - On 7 September 2018, the Thai government hosted a reception for all Thai and foreign officials and personnel involved in the rescue. His Majesty the King granted a royal decoration, the Most Admirable Order of the Direkgunabhorn, to 188 people who were involved in the rescue of the football team—114 foreigners and 74 Thais. The official list of recipients of the Order of the Direkgunabhorn for the Tham Luang cave rescue was published in the Royal Thai Government Gazette on 21 March 2019.
- United Kingdom:
  - On 24 July 2018, British prime minister Theresa May hosted a reception at 10 Downing Street with the Thai Ambassador for the British Cave Rescue Council divers and personnel involved in the rescue.
  - In November 2018, the Pride of Britain 2018 award was presented to the British cave rescue team for "Outstanding Bravery". The rescued children attended the award ceremony in London.
  - On 28 December 2018, seven British members of the rescue team were honoured in the 2019 New Year Honours. Rick Stanton and John Volanthen each received the George Medal; Chris Jewell and Jason Mallinson received the Queen's Gallantry Medal; and Josh Bratchley, Connor Roe and Vern Unsworth were appointed Members of the Order of the British Empire (MBE).
- International:
  - British and Australian divers, Stanton, Volanthen, Harris, Mallinson and Jewell were the first ever recipients of the Medal of Valor from the Professional Association of Diving Instructors (PADI), an international diver training organization.
  - On 5 January 2019, the Asian Football Federation awarded the Wild Boars a two-year support program, providing the club with technical support, training equipment and 100 Molten match balls a year. Three of the boys and their coach were invited as guests of honour to watch the match between Thailand and India at the 2019 AFC Asian Cup in the United Arab Emirates on 6 January 2019.

== See also ==
- 2010 Copiapó mining accident – the rescue of 33 men 69 days after a cave-in
