= Alpazat cave rescue =

Six British soldiers trapped in a flooded Mexican cave

The Alpazat cave rescue occurred in March 2004 after six British soldiers became trapped in the Alpazat Caverns in Puebla, Mexico near Cuetzalan. All six were rescued by British cave divers after spending eight days inside the cave. The incident resulted in diplomatic tension between Britain and Mexico, as the soldiers refused local help and there were rumours that they were surveying for uranium deposits.

== Background ==
The expedition members included military personnel from the Royal Navy, British Army and Royal Air Force who were members of the Combined Services Caving Association. In total, 12 men were part of the expedition. The caving trip was stated as an "official military expedition to support adventurous training." While six of the men were in the Alpazat Caverns on an expedition expected to take 36 hours, a flash flood blocked their exit, causing them to shelter in a pre-fabricated emergency camp in a drier part of the cave. The trapped men were later named as Chris Mitchell, Jonathan Sims, Charles Milton, Simon Cornhill, John Roe, and Toby Hamnett. The men camped on a 15 ft (4.6 m) ledge over a subterranean river. They were relatively well-supplied, and were able to make meals such as pasta with cheese and instant chocolate cake on a portable stove. They rationed their food supplies, as they did not know how long a rescue would take. They also had water-powered lights and sleeping bags with them. The trapped men were able to communicate with the rest of their team via the use of a Molefone radio.

Sims recounted the anxiety of their first night underground of hearing the "booming, crashing sounds" as the flash flood filled parts of the cave with water. The men stripped their clothes to deal with the hot conditions of the cave. They also fashioned a deck of playing cards out of a piece of paper cut into 52 pieces to pass the time. They described themselves as "high morale but incredibly bored" after five days of being trapped in the cave, during which they read the two novels in the camp.

The half of the team that was not trapped waited five nights before alerting Mexican authorities.

== Rescue ==
The six trapped soldiers were rescued after spending eight days trapped in the cave. Cave divers Richard Stanton and Jason Mallinson from the Cave Rescue Organisation assisted the soldiers one at a time as they exited the cave. Sims recounted, "I remember feeling overjoyed when [Stanton] surfaced and I saw his face. It was a great relief." The rescue consisted of traversing the 300 m (980 ft) flooded passageway to exit the cave. Stanton later said "we had to teach a few of them to dive through a considerable length of passage to get them out".

== Timeline ==
- 15 March 2004: Members of the Combined Services Caving Association enter the cave as part of a trip anticipated to take 36 hours
- 17 March 2004: Six Britons become trapped in the cave by a flash flood.
- 23 March 2004: Stanton and Mallinson arrive to assess the situation and prepare for rescue.
- 24 March 2004: By the end of the day, all the trapped men have been rescued

== Diplomatic consequences ==
The incident caused "anti-British sentiment" in Mexico due to lack of notification of the presence of British military in the country. This was further exacerbated by the soldiers refusing local help to instead wait on British divers. Then-President Vicente Fox sent a letter of protest to London about the affair, saying, "We are asking the British government to tell us whether these people are military personnel, and if they are, what they are doing there." The soldiers entered Mexico with tourist visas, and government officials were concerned that the soldiers were operating in some capacity for the British government rather than for pleasure. In response to rumours that the soldiers were looking for uranium ore, energy minister Felipe Calderón pledged to send nuclear research institute scientists into the caves after the soldiers were evacuated. Mexican media also had unfavorable coverage of the event. In response to the news that Pueblan police were keeping the media away from the rescue effort at the behest of British officials, newscaster Leonardo Kourchenko asked, "Are the Puebla state police subordinate to the British?"

== See also ==
- Cave rescue – Specialized field of wilderness rescue
