= Schroeder's Pants Cave =

Cave in Herkimer County, New York

- Buttonhole Cave
- Interactive map of Schroeder's Pants Cave
- Location: Goodell Corners, New York
- Coordinates: 43°6′6″N 74°49′45″W

Schroeder's Pants Cave is a cave located by Goodell Corners in Herkimer County, New York. It was initially explored in the 1950s by Herbert W. Schroeder and George A. Buck, teachers at the high school in Dolgeville, New York, and named for Mr. Schroeder after he tore out the seat of his pants during an early exploratory venture. In 1965, James G. Mitchell from Manheim, New York died of hypothermia after becoming stranded on a rope in a 75-foot (23 m) pit in the cave with a frigid waterfall. Initial efforts to recover Mitchell's body failed. A rescue team was flown from Washington, D.C., on Air Force Two. A three-day effort to retrieve Mitchell was aborted after repeated failures and a partial collapse. The cave was abandoned and blasted shut, essentially making the cave a tomb. Over 5000 dollars were spent on him to retrieve the body; Mitchell's death made headlines again forty-one years later when a group returned to the cave and successfully recovered his remains. Supposedly the cave waters were dye traced to East Creek 3 miles (4.8 km) away.
