= McBrides Cave =

McBrides Cave is a wild cave system in Jackson County, Alabama. It is about 400 or 500 feet deep. It was the site of a major cave rescue in 1997, when Gerald Moni broke his left femur in a 9 foot fall. Another notable rescue took place in 1992.
