= Caving in the United Kingdom =

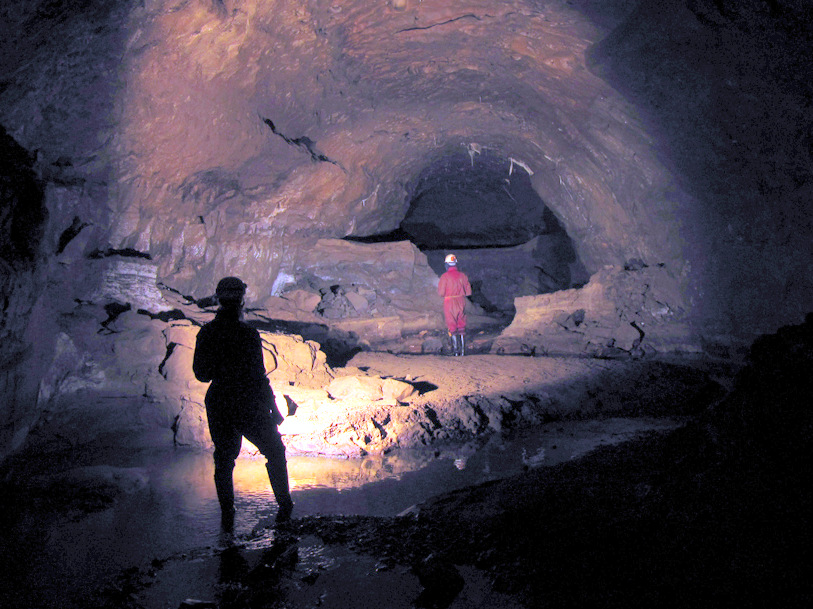
Duke Street in the Three Counties System, the longest cave system in the UK

Recreational caving in the United Kingdom dates back to the mid-19th century. The four major caving areas of the United Kingdom are North Yorkshire, South Wales, Derbyshire, and the Mendips. Minor areas include Devon, Forest of Dean, North Wales, and the Scottish Highlands.

Caving grew in popularity in the 1950s and 60s through participation in caving clubs. There are about 4,000 active cavers in the UK and nearly twenty times that number who attend instructor-led courses each year in caves around the country. In addition, many tourists visit show caves such as Wookey Hole Caves.

Cave diving is a niche technical area of caving practised in the UK since the 1930s. This skill enables cavers to explore water-filled cave passages in Britain, and around the world. In recent years, British cave divers have been called on internationally for cave rescues and recoveries.

== History ==
Before modern caving developed, John Beaumont wrote detailed descriptions of some Mendip caves in 1681, and in 1780 John Hutton described some of the caves around Ingleborough, which was to popularise caves to those seeking the picturesque.

In the 19th century, John Birkbeck explored potholes in Yorkshire, notably Gaping Gill in 1842 and Alum Pot in 1847–48, returning there in the 1870s. In the mid-1880s, Herbert E. Balch began exploring Wookey Hole Caves and in the 1890s Balch was introduced to the caves of the Mendip Hills. Frenchman Édouard-Alfred Martel reached the underground lake of Marble Arch in Northern Ireland in 1895. In Yorkshire, he made the second descent, after Birkbeck in 1842, into the pothole of Gaping Gill, reaching the Main Chamber, 170 feet lower than Birkbeck had ventured.

By the latter years of the 19th century, caving was established as a sport in the British Isles but remained largely the preserve of a very few adventurers and scientists. One of the oldest established clubs, Yorkshire Ramblers' Club, was founded in 1892 and began exploring the Marble Arch Caves from 1907. The University of Bristol Spelæological Society was founded in 1919. By the 1930s around 30 caving clubs existed. Eli Simpson formed the British Speleological Association (BSA) in 1935. In the same year, the Cave Rescue Organisation was established, the first such organisation in the world. Jack Sheppard undertook the first cave diving explorations in the world in Wookey Hole Caves in the 1930s using standard diving dress.

During the Second World War, Bob Leakey discovered the 9 kilometres (5.6 mi) long Mossdale Caverns north of Grassington in the Yorkshire Dales. After the war, Graham Balcombe formed the Cave Diving Group in 1946. The Cave Research Group of Great Britain separated from BSA in 1948. Jim Eyre was one of the first European cavers to explore the caves of Asia.

Interest in caving grew rapidly in the 1950s and 60s. Neil Moss was the victim of a famous caving accident after descending a narrow unexplored shaft in Peak Cavern in Derbyshire 1959. This period saw the formation of more clubs, regional councils to manage cave access, and the National Association of Caving in 1968. The 7th International Congress of Speleology of the International Union of Speleology (UIS) was held in the UK in 1977 at which British speleological achievements were presented to delegates from around the world. Gordon Warwick became a vice president of the UIS, taking a major role at its international conferences.

British cave divers continued to pioneer explorations at Wookey Hole in the Mendips, Keld Head in the Yorkshire Dales and Pozo Azul in Spain. Innovations in techniques and equipment in the 1970s, 1980s and onwards improved safety and made more advanced exploration possible. In 1979, watched by 20 million television viewers, The Underground Eiger showed a world record-breaking cave dive of 1,800 metres (5,900 ft) made by Geoff Yeadon and Oliver Statham. Two years later, Martyn Farr established a new world record for underwater cave penetration in the Bahamas.

Because of the long and active history of caving, almost every entrance with surface access in Britain has been fully explored, so the majority of new discoveries take place after months and sometimes years of cave digging. Notable recent discoveries since 1995 include Titan, the largest shaft in Britain, and Ogof Draenen, the second-longest cave in Britain. Fulfilling an idea first proposed in 1968, the Three Counties System, which was first explored in 1898, was proven to be interconnected in 2010–11. At the end of 2024 and during 2025, Redhouse Swallet, a 1,800-metre (5,900 ft) cave in the Forest of Dean, was extended to over 10 kilometres (6.21 miles).

In 2018, there were up to 4,000 regular cavers in the UK and about 70,000 people who went on instructor-led courses into caves in the Yorkshire Dales.

== Sites ==
=== Caving areas ===
The four major caving areas of the United Kingdom are North Yorkshire, South Wales, Derbyshire, and the Mendips. Minor areas include Devon, Forest of Dean, North Wales, and the Scottish Highlands.

=== Show caves ===
There are a number of show caves open to visitors in the main caving areas, including Wookey Hole Caves on Mendip, Dan-yr-Ogof in South Wales, Peak Cavern in the Peak District, Ingleborough Cave in the Yorkshire Dales, and Marble Arch Caves in County Fermanagh.

== Caving organisations ==
The British Caving Association is the national body for caving in the United Kingdom. There are a number of regional caving organisations in the UK such as the Cambrian Caving Council. Many caving clubs exist, which often run expeditions abroad, for example to particular territories such as Matienzo or Picos. The British Cave Research Association promotes the study of caves and associated phenomena.

== Cave rescue ==
British Cave Rescue Council
- Founded: 1967; 59 years ago
- Type: Registered Charity
- Region served: British Isles
- Services: Cave Rescue
- Chairman: Peter Dennis
- Key people: Bill Whitehouse MBE
- Website: www.caverescue.org.uk

=== British Cave Rescue Council ===
The British Cave Rescue Council (BCRC) was established in 1967 and is the coordinating body for fifteen cave rescue organisations in the British Isles, including the Cave Rescue Organisation, the Upper Wharfedale Fell Rescue Association and the Irish Cave Rescue Organisation. These organisations have around 1,000 volunteer rescuers available with specialised equipment to provide regional police forces with the capabilities to conduct rescues in caves and disused mines in the British Isles. The rescuers are all experienced cavers who have undertaken training in underground rescue techniques and many have additional specialist skills such as casualty care or cave diving.

Through BCRC, British cave divers, particularly Richard Stanton, John Volanthen, Jason Mallison and Chris Jewell have been called on internationally for cave rescues and recoveries. These include the Alpazat cave rescue in Mexico in 2004, France in 2010, Ireland in 2011, Norway in 2006 and 2014, and the Tham Luang cave rescue in Thailand in 2018.

== Information resources ==
=== Libraries ===
Many clubs hold extensive libraries recording decades of exploration in terms of surveys and logbooks, as well as newsletters, reports and books detailing the history of cave explorations both within their nearby areas and abroad on expeditions. Other information is in the form of extensive personal archives that have been bequeathed to the community.

Some areas also have extensive databases of diagrams and other survey documents for particular areas. The following libraries are open to club members, some of which are also open to non-members.

- British Caving Library – funded by the British Caving Association (BCA) and currently employing a part-time librarian
- British Cave Research Association Online Archive
- Westminster Speleological Group
- Red Rose Caving and Pothole Club Library
- Craven Pothole Club
- University of Bristol Spelæological Society library including museum
- Grampian Speleological Group library catalogue
- Mendip Cave Registry and Archive
- Northern Pennine Club
- Bradford Pothole Club
- U.C.E.T. – United Cavers Exploration Team (also covers Mine Exploration – UK)
- Yorkshire Subterranean Society
- Orpheus Caving Club

=== Surveys ===
Cave surveys have historically been kept by the person who drew them (with the measurement data often lost), or deposited in a club library. They are seldom published (except in reduced form in a guidebook) and can be difficult to obtain because there is no central catalogue listing who holds what.

In about 2012 a central repository for survey data and drawn-up surveys was set up by the BCA and now contains a significant amount of UK (and some foreign, from expeditions) survey data. There are also projects that are attempting to assemble online maps and catalogues from repositories of surveys by overlaying them on satellite imagery:

- cavemaps.org – Yorkshire-based
- BDCC Mendip map – Bracknell District Caving Club map

=== Guidebooks ===
The most widely referenced guidebooks for caving the UK are:

- Northern Caves in three volumes, most recent complete edition published 1998, new volume for The Three Counties System and the North-West published 2017
- Mendip Underground – A Caver's Guide, published 2013
- Caves of the Peak District, published December 2010
- The Caves of South Wales, published 1995
- Selected Caves of Britain and Ireland, published 1997

=== Periodicals ===
- Descent (bimonthly caving magazine)
- Speleology (formerly Caves and Caving) the magazine of the BCRA.
- Some clubs publish journals which include details of their new explorations.

== See also ==
- List of UK caving fatalities
