= Labastide-de-Virac =

- Commune
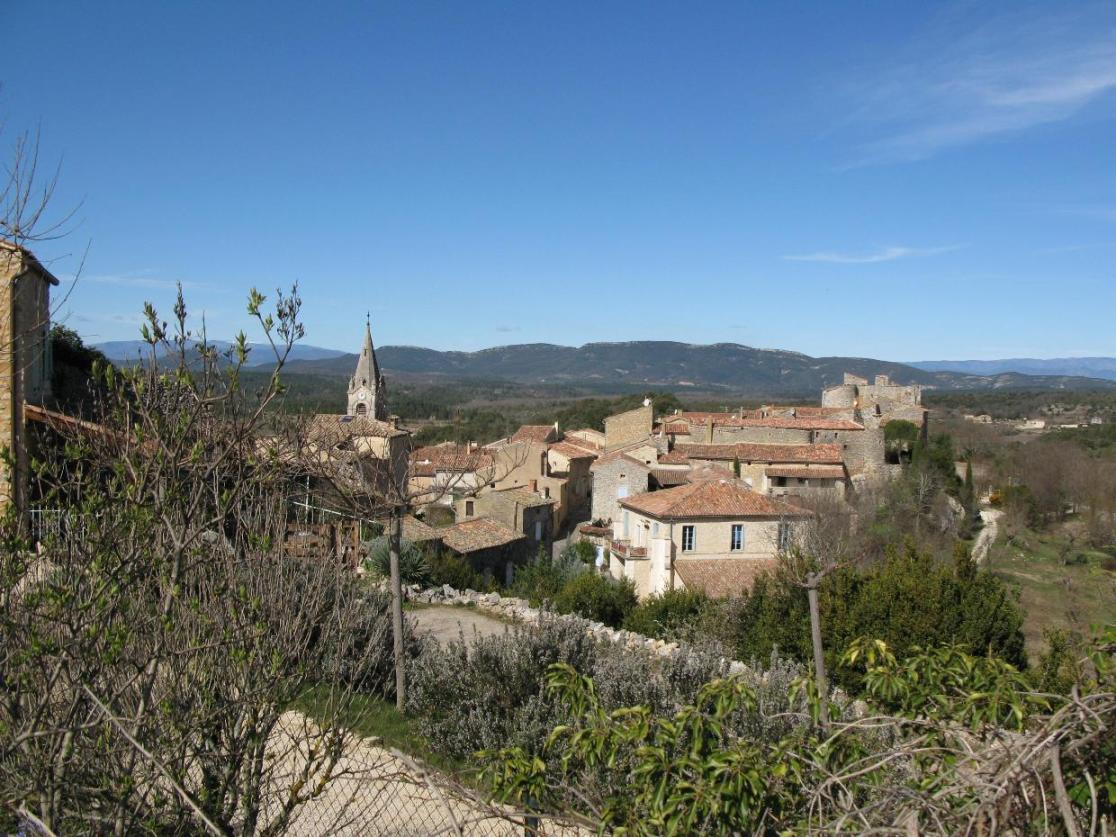
- A general view of Labastide-de-Virac
- Location of Labastide-de-Virac
- Location within France Location within Auvergne-Rhône-Alpes
- Coordinates: 44°21′04″N 4°24′13″E
- Country: France
- Region: Auvergne-Rhône-Alpes
- Department: Ardèche
- Arrondissement: Largentière
- Canton: Vallon-Pont-d'Arc

Government
  - Mayor (2020–2026): Jacques Marron
- Area^{1}: 23.32 km^{2} (9.00 sq mi)
- Elevation: 260 m (850 ft)
- Highest elevation: 408 m (1,339 ft)
- Lowest elevation: 40 m (130 ft)
- Population (2023): 328
  - Density: 14.1/km^{2} (36.4/sq mi)
- Time zone: UTC+01:00 (CET)
  - Summer (DST): UTC+02:00 (CEST)
- INSEE/Postal code: 07113 /07150
- ^{1} French Land Register data, which excludes lakes, ponds, glaciers > 1 km^{2} (0.386 sq mi or 247 acres) and river estuaries.

Labastide-de-Virac (French pronunciation: [labastid də viʁak]; Occitan: La Bastida de Virac) is a commune in the southern French department of Ardèche. It features a fort dating to the 16th century.

== Population ==
Historical population
Year	Pop.	±% p.a.
1968	145	—
1975	155	+0.96%
1982	184	+2.48%
1990	193	+0.60%
1999	218	+1.36%
2007	210	−0.47%
2012	249	+3.47%
2017	301	+3.87%
2023	328	+1.44%
Source: INSEE

== See also ==
- Côtes du Vivarais AOC
- Communes of the Ardèche department
