= Cave Rescue Organisation =

UK voluntary body

The Cave Rescue Organisation (CRO) is a voluntary body based in the caving area of the Yorkshire Dales in northern England. Founded in 1935, it is the oldest cave rescue agency in the world.

Although it is staffed by volunteers and funded by donations, it is integrated into the emergency services and will be called out if the police are notified that there has been a caving incident. CRO often doubles as local mountain rescue and frequently rescues livestock which have become stuck in caves or on crags. In 1986 team member Dave Anderson drowned in Rowten Pot whilst attending an incident.

CRO publishes an annual incident report.

== See also ==
- British Cave Rescue Council
- Cave Diving Group
- Caving in the United Kingdom
