= Family tree of early and legendary Thai monarchs =

== Sukhothai-related dynasties ==
Patumsuriyawong (Note: Possibly identified as Suryavarman II) lineage
From Chawa (ชวา, Luang Prabang) or Nam Ou basin.	Suriya Racha (สุริยราชา); King of Pichit Prakan	Sirisutha Ratchathewi (สิริสุธาราชเทวี)
Si Nao Nam Thum (Note: Founder of Sukhothai. However, another source, Legend of Kalawandith, says Sukhothai was founded in 500 by Phraya Pali Rat (พระยาพาลีราช).); Ruler of Saraluang–Song Khwae; King of Sukhothai–Chaliang r. 1157/58–1181/82	Suriya Thewi (สุริยาเทวี)	Chantha Racha (จันทราชา); Former K. of Phichit Prakan; King of Sukhothai–Chaliang r. 1208–1238	Nang Nak (นางนาค)
Sukhon Thewi (สุขรมหาเทวี); Princess of Yaśodharapura	Pha Mueang; Ruler of Mueang Rat (Note: Probably Nacontai (นครไทย) in the Simon de la Loubère's record, Du royaume de Siam.); Late 12th–mid 13th centuries	Sueang	Phra Ruang I (Si Inthrathit); K. of Sukhothai–Sawankhalok; 1188–1270 r. 1238–1270	Rebuild Sawankhalok/ Phra Ruang Dynasty establishment
Khamhaeng Phra Ram; Ruler of Saraluang–Song Khwae (Note: Present-day Phitsanulok)	First king of Si Nao Nam Thum dynasty	Some scholars speculate he's from upper Nan River Valley
Si Sattha; Ruler of Saraluang–Song Khwae; 1315–?	Ban Mueang; King of Sukhothai–Sawankhalok ?–1271 r. 1270–1271	Ram Khamhaeng; King of Sukhothai– Sawankhalok; 1237/47–1298 r. 1279–1298	Si Chanthra (ศรีจันทรา)	Unknown (Commoner from Donwun)
Unknown (Princess)	Unknown (Princess)	Ngua Nam Thum; King of Sukhothai ?–1347/48 r. 1323/24–1347/48	Loe Thai; King of Sukhothai r. 1298–1323	May Hnin Thwe-Da (สุวรรณเทวี); ~1250s–?	Wareru; K. of Hanthawaddy; 1253–1307 r. 1287–1307
After the reign of Ram Khamhaeng, the seat of Sawankhalok was vacant for 50 years	Hkun Law; K. of Hanthawaddy r.1307–1311	Hnin U Yaing c. 1260s–1319
Sumontha Thewi (สุมณฑาเทวี)	Lithai; Ex-ruler of Sawankhalok (r.1340–1362/63); King of Sukhothai r. 1347–1368	Continue to the Wareru Dynasty
Khottrabong (โคตรบอง); Ruler of Sawankhalok r. 1368–1429	Appointed ruler (Independent)	After the reign of Lithai, Sukhothai became a vassal of Ayutthaya
Saeng Hang (แสงหัง); Ruler of Sawankhalok r. 1429–?	Usurper (Independent)	Continue to the Phra Ruang Dynasty

== Phitsanulok–Chai Nat–Singburi ==
From Mueang Chiang Saen
Sai Nam Phueng (สายน้ำผึ้ง); Ruler of Sawankhalok r. 1106–1111; Later King of Lavo's Ayodhya r. 1111–1165	Dara Ratchathewi (ดาราราชเทวี)
Siri Pracha Ratchathewi (ศิริประชาราชเทวี)	Suthamma Racha (สุธรรมราชา/ศรีธรรมไตรปิฏก); Ruler of Phitsanulok r. ?–1115; Later king of Lavo's Lavapura r. 1115–1181	Pathumsuriyawong lineage
(Re)founded Phitsanulok	Unknown (Pathum- suriyawong lineage)
Inthawadi Thewi (อินทวดีเทวี)	Phitsanu Racha (พิษณุราชา); Ruler of Phitsanulok	Sirikanya Ratchathewi (ศิริกัญญาราชเทวี)	Phichai Racha (พิชัยราชา); Ruler of Phichai Buri (Note: Possibly Phetchaburi)	Founder of Phichai Buri
Founder of Phichit	Suchawadi Thewi (สุชาวดีเทวี)	Si Sing (ศรีสิงห์); Ruler of Phichai Buri	Suwanna Bappata (สุวรรณบัพพตา)
Chetthakuman (เชษฐกุมาร)	Chantha Thewi (จันทาเทวี)	Surintharacha (สุรินทราชา); Ruler of Chai Nat	Suriyawongsa (สุริยวงศา); Ruler of Chai Nat	Pathumwadi (ปทุมวดี)	Anurat (อนุราช); Ex-ruler of Chai Nat; Ruler of Sing Buri	In Sucha Thewi (อินสุชาเทวี)
Founder of Chai Nat	Intharacha (อินทราชา); Ruler of Sing Buri	Rebuild Singburi and enthroned as a new ruler
Ramesuan (ราเมศวร); Ruler of Sing Buri
Borommaracha (บรมราชา); Ruler of Sing Buri
Maha Chakkrawat (มหาจักรวรรดิ); Ruler of Sing Buri
Phothisan (โพธิสาร); Ruler of Sing Buri

== Early Lavo (Uthong) dynasty ==
=== 1st theory: Lavo's Singburi lineage ===
Unknown origin
Ekracha (เอกราชา); Ruler of Sing Buri	Boromtilok (บรมติโลก); Ruler of Sing Buri
Siri Phupa Racha (ศิริภูปราชา); Ruler of Sing Buri
Mani Mala (มณีมาลา)	Intharacha; Ex-ruler of Sing Buri; Ruler of Phetchaburi	Uthong; Ruler of Sing Buri
Phummawadi Thewi (ภุมมาวดีเทวี)	Uthong (Note: During the reign of Uthong, Phetchaburi faced the spread of plague, Uthong and the people evacuated to establish a new settlement in the present-Ayutthaya island, which continues to the formation of the Ayutthaya Kingdom.); Ex-ruler of Phetchaburi; 1st Ayutthaya's king	Rebuild Phetchaburi and enthroned as a new ruler.
Continue to the Lavo (Uthong) dynasty of Ayutthaya

=== 2nd theory: Phetchaburi – Lavo's Ayodhya lineage ===
King of Suphannabhum
King of Ayutthaya
King of Lavo's Lopburi (as a frontier city of Sukhothai)

Singhanavati dynasty
Phangkharat; King of Singhanavati
Thukkhita; King of Singhanavati	Phrom; Ruler of Wiang; Chai Prakan
Kaeo-supha (แก้วสุภา)	Chaiyasiri; Ruler of Wiang Chai; Prakan and Nacontai	Origin remains uncleared, possibly from the Angkor, Mun River Valley, Lavo, South India, or south of the Kra Isthmus.	From Wiang Phang Kham of Singhanavati	Kraison Rat (ไกรศรราช)
Soi La/U Thong I (พระยาสร้อยหล้า/อู่ทอง)	Chaisiri or Chaiyasiri? (ชัยศิริ); Ruler of Phetchaburi	Pprappanom Tteleiseri; Ruler of Phetchaburi r.1188–?	1st Tritrueng King; King of Phraek Si Racha (Name unidentified)
U Thong II (พระเจ้าอู่ทอง)	Phanom Wang; Ruler of Nakhon Si Thammarat	Sadiang Thong; Princes of Tritrueng	2nd Tritrueng King; King of Phraek Si Racha; Later Lavo King
U Thong III (พระยาอู่ทอง)	Sontra; Ruler of Na Tranom	Kuman; Ruler of Tathong	Sri Maharacha; Ruler of Sa U Lao; Later K. of Thep Nakhon Chaisiri	Son Sai (สนไส้/จันทรเทวีศรีรัตนฉายา)
Unknown; Princes of U Thong	Ramracha (Uthong?); 1st king of Ayutthaya
Ramesuan; 2nd king of Ayutthaya
Lavo dynasty of Ayutthaya
Daughter of Loe Thai (Sukhothai Kingdom)	Pho Ngua; 3rd king of Ayutthaya; Ex-ruler of Suphannabhum	Unknown; Princess
Suphannabhum dynasty of Ayutthaya

=== 3rd theory: Si Satchanalai – Lavo's Ayodhya lineage ===
King of Suphannabhum
King of Phetchaburi
King of Lavo's Ayodhya–Phetchaburi
King of Ayutthaya–Suphannabhum
King of Lavo's Lopburi
King of Lavo's Ayodhya (formerly "Mueang Nong Son" or "Mueang Wat Derm")
King of Ayutthaya
King of Nakhon Si Thammarat
King of Lavo's Ayodhya–Lopburi
King of Lavo's Ayodhya–Suphannabhum
King of Ayutthaya–Phetchaburi

Timeline and family tree of Thai monarchs in the lower Chao Phraya Valley from the 10th century to the formation of the Ayutthaya Kingdom

Invented Chula Sakarat	Kakapat/Sakkorndam (กากะพัตร/สักกรดำ); King of Takkasila (Ayodhyapura?) r. 566–638
Ramaraj (รามราช); King of Ramburi (Ayodhyapura?) r. 648?–?	Camadevi (จามเทวี); Queen of Haripuñjaya r. 622–629	Kalavarnadishraj (กาฬวรรณดิศราช); King of Takkasila (Ayodhyapura?) r. 638–648; King of Lavo r. 648–700	Founder of Lavo
Continue to the Camadevi dynasty of Haripuñjaya	Several generations	Continue to the Lavo dynasty of Lavo Kingdom	Fall of Ayodhyapura
From Mueang Bang Than (บางทาน), Kamphaeng Phet	Uchitajakraphad (อุฉิฎฐกะจักรวรรดิ) r. ?–927/928; Later King of Haripuñjaya	Continue to the Lavo dynasty of Haripuñjaya	Kong กง r. 807–867
Maha Phutthasakorn (พระมหาพุทธสาคร); Founder of Mueang Wat Derm r. 934–964 (Note: Calculated from the text given in the chronicle: "สิ้น 97 ปีสวรรคต ศักราชได้ 336 ปี พระยาโคดมได้ครองราชสมบัติอยู่ ณ วัดเดิม 30 ปี" which is transcribed as "...at the age of 97, he passed away in the year 336 of the Chula Sakarat. Phraya Kodom reigned in the Mueang Wat Derm for 30 years...".)	Tambralinga conquered of Lavo in 927/928, Lavo' king Uchitajakraphad fled to Haripuñjaya	Phan พาน/พาลราช r. 867–916; Also King of Haripuñjaya (r. 913–916)
Kottabong โคตรตะบอง; Ruler of Mueang Wat Derm r. 964–983	Sujita (สุชิตราช/ชีวกะ/วรราช); King of Tambralinga (r. ?–1003?); King of Lavo (r. 927/928)	Lavo led by Sujita seized Suphannabhum, Chadachota and Thamikaraj fled to Tak and Haripuñjaya.	Unknown; Potentially, Phansa (พระพรรษา) r. 913–1003? or 916–1006?	Several generations
Usurper
Sinthapomarinthra Kraek (สินทพอมรินทร แกรก); Ruler of Mueang Wat Derm r. 983–1042 (59 yrs)	Devastation of Lavo due to the 1002–1010 Angkorian Civil Wars	Kampoch (กัมโพช) r. 927/928–?	Lavo led by Kampoch attacked Haripuñjaya in 930/931 but failed.	920s–1050s Lower Chao Phraya Valley's political turmoil
Narai of Lavo claimed the throne and moved the Lavo seat to "Mueang Wat Derm" then renamed the city "Ayodhya"	Angkorin king, Suryavarman I, destroyed Lavo's Lavapura in 1002.	Sri Lakshmi Pativarman (ศรีลักษมีปติวรมัน) r. 1006–1052? (Appointed by Suryavarman I)	Suphannabhum and Haripuñjaya seized Lavo in 1052	Rambandit (รามบัณฑิตย์) r. 40 yrs	Internal political turmoil
Pagan dynasty	Unknown origin Haripuñjaya?	Thamikaraj (อาทิตตะราช/อาทิตยธรรมิกราช); King of Haripuñjaya	Aong In (องค์อินทร์) r. 1128?–1163?
Anawrahta; King of Pagan r.1044-1077	Agga Mahethi (แก้วประพาฬ); 1015-1080	Singhanavati dynasty	Patima; Sudhaduangchan (ปฏิมาสุดาดวงจันทร์)	Chadachota (จันทรโชติ) r.1052-1069	1058 Pagan invasion of Lavo and lower Chao Phraya basin
Saw Lu; King of Pagan r. 1077-1084	Pangkharaj; King of Singhanavati r. 915–?	1087 Pagan invasion of Lavo and lower Chao Phraya basin	Lavo's capital was shifted to Ayodhaya	Narai (นารายณ์) r.1082–1087 (No heir)	Supojarat (สุพจราช); King of Si Satchanalai
Several generations	Dhukkhita; King of Singhanavati	Kaewsupha (แก้วสุภา); Princess of Wiang Chai Narai	Sridham Tripiṭaka (Phrom) ศรีธรรมไตรปิฏก; King of Chiang Saen	Pathumdevi (ปทุมเทวี)	Unknown; King of Si Satchanalai
Katae (กาแต) r. 1163–1203	Fall of Singhanavati	Chaiyasiri; Ruler of Wiang Chai; Prakan and Nacontai r. 1089–1107	1087–1089 Ayodhya's civil wars	Chatisakorn (ชาติสาคร); Ruler of Chiang Rai
Chaisiri (ชัยศิริ); Ruler of Phetchaburi r. 1188–1214	Soi La/U Thong I (พระยาสร้อยหล้า/อู่ทอง) r. 1203–1205	Luang (พระเจ้าหลวง) r. 1089–1111	Kraisornrat (ไกรศรราช) r. 1106–1115? Also King of Si Satchanalai	Suladevi (สุลเทวี); Princess of Si Satchanalai
Phra Ratchadevi (พระราชเทวี)/ Dara Ratchathewi (ดาราราชเทวี)	Sai Nam Peung (สายน้ำผึ้ง) r. 1111–1165	Unknown (Mon)
No male heir	Dhammikaraja (ธรรมิกราชา) r. 1165–1205	Siri Pracha Ratchathewi (ศิริประชาราชเทวี)	Sri Thammasokkarat (ศรีธรรมโศกราช) r. 1115?–1181
Narupatidnavarman (Later Indravarman II) r. 1181?–1218 (Appointed by Jayavarman VII)	Pprappanom; Tteleiseri (พนมทะเลศรี); Ruler of Phetchaburi r. 1214–?	Unknown; Princess of U Thong	Uthong II; Ex-ruler of Thep Nakhon Chaisiri; Ex-king of Uthong r. 1205–1253	Thonglanrach (ท้องลันราช); Ruler of Sukandhakiree (Phetchaburi) (สุคันธคีรี) r. ?–1289
From Wiang Phang Kham	Ai (อ้าย); Ruler of Mueang Nakhon (Ligor?)	Yi (ยี่); Ruler of Tanintharyi	Sam (สาม); Ruler of Phetchaburi r. early 1300s	Probably fled to Nakhon Si Thammarat due to the political pressure from the Angkor
1st Tritrueng King; King of Phraek Si Racha (Name unidentified)	Revival of Ligor by Phetchaburi	Patthasucharat (พัตตาสุจราช); King of Si Satchanalai	Chaithat (ชัยทัต)	Unknown; Princess	Chaisena (ชัยเสน); Ayodhya: r. 1253–1289; Sukandhakiree: r. 1289–?
Sadieng Thong; Princes of Tritrueng	Phanomwang; Ruler of Nakhon Si Thammarat r. 1342–?	Boromtrilok (บรมไตรโลก)	Dhammatrilokthi (ธรรมไตรโลกฒิ); King of Si Satchanalai	Suwanracha (สุวรรณราชา) r. 1289–1301	Potentially "Gan-mu-ding" in the Chinese record in 1295
2nd Tritrueng King; Ex-king of Phraek Si Racha r. 1283–1319	Sontra; Ruler of Na Tranom	U Thong III (พระเจ้าอู่ทอง) r. ?–1335?	Thammaraja (ธรรมราชา) r. 1301–1310	Kalaya Devi (กัลยาเทวี)
Kuman; Ruler of Tathong	U Thong IV (พระยาอู่ทอง) r. 1335?–1351	Boromracha (บรมราชา) r. 1310–1344	Sunantha Devi (สุนันทาเทวี)
Son Sai (สนไส้/จันทรเทวีศรีรัตนฉายา)	Sri Maharacha; Ex-ruler of Sa U Lao; King of Nakhon Si Thammarat	Unknown; Princess of U Thong	Ramathibodi I (Uthong V); King of Ayodhya (r. 1344–1351); 1st king of Ayutthaya r. 1351–1369
Sukhothai dynasty	Sri Thammasokaraj dynasty of Nakhon; Si Thammarat	Ramesuan; 2nd king of Ayutthaya; 1st: r. 1369–1370; 2nd: 1388–1395
Lavo dynasty of Ayutthaya
Maha Thammaracha II; King of Sukhothai r. 1368–1399	Daughter of Loe Thai (Sukhothai Kingdom)	Pha Ngua; 3rd king of Ayutthaya; Ex-ruler of Suphannabhum r. 1370–1388	Unknown; Princess
Phra Ruang dynasty of Sukhothai	Suphannabhum dynasty of Ayutthaya
