= Pu Chao Lao Chok =

Semi-Legendary leader in Northern Thailand

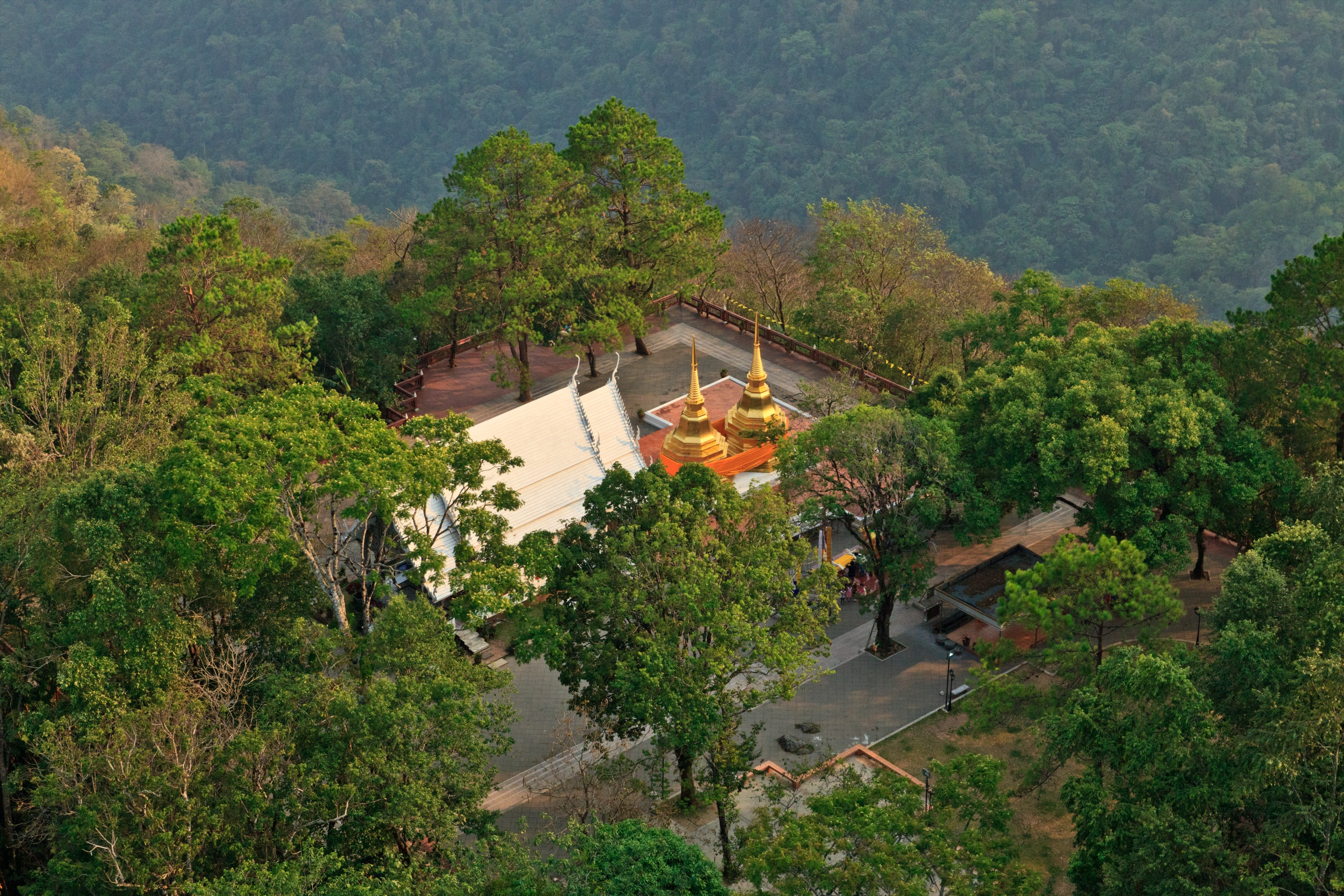
Pu Chao Lao Chok is often cited as being the original protector of Phra That Doi Tung since its foundation.

Pu Chao Lao Chok (Thai: ปู่เจ้าลาวจก) is a semi-legendary leader of the Lua tribe who appears in various Northern Thai Chronicles. His legend is associated with Phra That Doi Tung and the semi-legendary King Lawachangaraj, founder of the Ngoenyang Kingdom.

== Mythology ==
Mythology surrounding Phu Chao Lao Chok are found in many Northern Thai City Chronicle traditions, such as the Phayao Chronicle and Legend of Prince Singhanavati as well as Buddhist chronicles such as the chronicle of Phra That Doi Tung.

=== Leader of Lawa Tribe ===
According to the Phayao Chronicle (National Library manuscript), Phu Chao Lao Chok, along with his wife Ya Thao Lao Chok, ruled the Lua tribe of Doi Tung. The two owned 500 digging hoes (chok), thus making them the chief and giving him the name "Lao Chok". They subsisted on agriculture, where Phu Chao Lao Chok farmed around Doi Din Daeng below Phra That Doi Tung, later giving it the name Doi Phu Chao. They sold their produce to the Tai peoples who have settled the lowlands at the Doi Tha Khai market while buying fish, betel nuts, and various foods from the Tai.

Phu Chao Lao Chok had 3 sons, Lawakhumpho (also called Lua Mo), Thasalakkho (also called Lua Lan), and Lawakhantha (also called Lua Klin) respectively. Following Lua customs, he divided his treasures among his sons and sent them to rule various mueangs, making Lawakhumpho the ruler of Mueang Sathuang, Thasalakkho the ruler of Mueang Khwang, and Lawakhantha the ruler of Mueang Khiak.

A Historian, Sujit Wongthes, believes this is evidence that the Lua people possessed advanced metalworking and Phu Chao Lao Chok controlled the most advanced technology at that time, namely digging hoes. The Lua then exchanged them for rice from the Tai people, who are skilled at wet-rice agriculture, allowing them to produce a higher quantity of rice.

=== Protector of Phra That Doi Tung ===
According to the legend, Phra That Doi Tung was created when Phra Maha Kassappa brought the Buddha's relic to Phaya Achuttharaj, king of the Khom at Wiang Khwang. Land atop Doi Tung was purchased from Pu Chao Lao Chok and his wife for the construction of the Phra That Doi Tung Pagoda to enshrine the Buddha's relic. Phra Maha Kassapa then erected an enormous flagpole atop the mountain, from which Doi Tung derived its name (flag mountain). Ashutaraja then appointed Pu Chao Lao Chok and his wife to serve as guardians of the relics, a role they fulfilled through daily offerings to the pagoda until their deaths.

In other legends associated with Doi Tung, when the Buddha journeyed through Doi Din Daeng (Doi Tung area), Lao Chok offered alms to him.

=== Death and Opapatika ===
Northern Thai chronicle legends record that King Lawachangaraj, founder of the Ngoenyang Kingdom, was the reincarnated spirit of Pu Chao Lao Chok. Having accumulated merit through their role as guardian of Phra That Doi Tung, Phu Chao Lao Chok reincarnated as a deva named Lawaphummathevada, becoming the protector deity of Doi Tung.

1000 years later, The two saw that the people of Yonok have no faith in Buddhism. Thus, when King Anawrahta sought to find a representative ruler for Yonok for his meeting to establish the Chulasakarat calendar, Lord Indra called upon Lawaphumathevada and his wife to descend to earth and become the ruler of Yonok as a form of Opapatika - a form of spontaneous birth without physical gestation in Buddhism, a reincarnation reserved for divine beings. Lawaphumathevada thus descended upon Doi Tung via a miraculous silver ladder, then declared himself Lawachangaraj and founded the Kingdom of Ngoenyang, meaning "silver ladder", along with adopting the Chulasakaraj from King Anawrahta.

=== Legacy ===
The Phu Sam Sao mountains (ภูสามเส้า), later known as Doi Nang Non, consist of three main peaks named after locations from the legend of Phu Chao Lao Chok: Doi Chong, where the son of Pu Chao Lao Chok waits for his father; Doi Ya Thao, where the wife of Pu Chao Lao Chok resided; and Doi Din Daeng, the residence of Phu Chao Lao Chok himself, later known as Doi Phu Chao or Doi Tung.

The name "Doi Pu Chao" appears in the Chiang Rai No.6 inscription from the base of a statue of Rushi Vachamaruek from 1604.

== Identity ==
Many historians, such as Srisak Valipodom, believe that Pu Chao Lao Chok is the same person as Lawachangaraj; thus, Chueang and Mangrai are of Lua lineage due to being his descendants. However, Aphichit Sirichai believes that Lawachangaraj and Pu Chao Lao Chok are different people; he argues that Pu Chao Lao Chok is from 561 BE (18 AD) and Lawachangaraj is from Chulasakaraj 1, or 1181 BE (638 AD).
