= Phrom =

King of Singhanavati

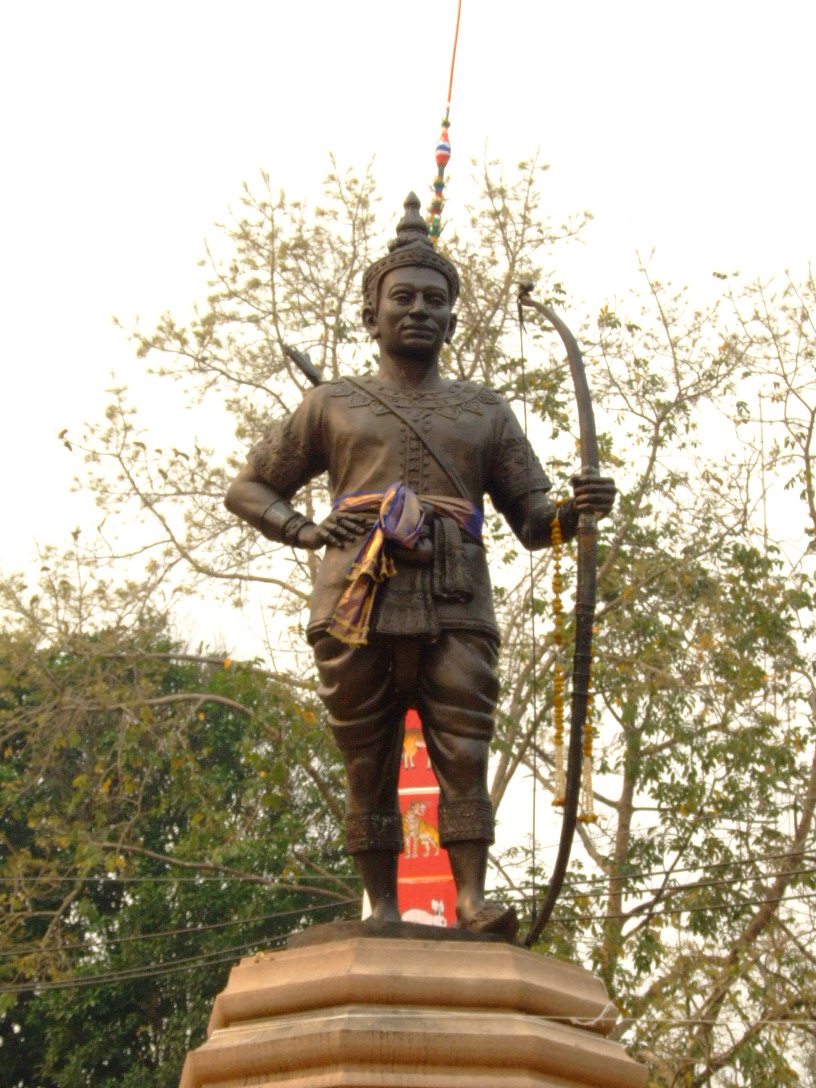
- Phrom memorial in Mae Sai district, northernmost of Thailand

King of Yonok at Chai Prakan
- Reign: 379–438
- Predecessor: Phraya Khom
- Successor: Chaiyasiri
- Born: 361; Vieng Si Tuang
- Died: 438; Chai Prakan
- Spouse: Kaeosupa
- Issue: Chaiyasiri
- House: Singhanavati
- Father: Bhrngaraja
- Mother: Devi
- Religion: Buddhism

Phrom (Thai: พรหม; pronounced [pʰrōm]), also known as Phrom the Great (พรหมมหาราช; pronounced [pʰrōm māhǎː râːt]) or Phromkuman (พรหมกุมาร; pronounced [pʰrōm.kū.māːn]), is a semi-legendary ruler associated with the Yonok Kingdom in the Lan Na region of present-day northern Thailand. He is traditionally regarded as the first Thai monarch to bear the title Maharaja (lit. 'the Great'), though accounts of his life derive primarily from legends and later chronicles rather than contemporary historical records.

The chronology of Phrom’s era has long been debated. Earlier scholarship placed his lifetime between the 9th and 11th centuries CE, based on a misinterpretation of the era systems used in the Legend of Singhanavati. More recent studies identify these systems as the Buddhist era and the Shaka era, suggesting instead that Phrom should be dated to the 4th–5th centuries CE, although chronological inconsistencies remain within the legendary sources.

According to tradition, Phrom rose to prominence through military campaigns, established his rule at Wiang Chai Prakan, and is credited with founding settlements and religious monuments in the Kok River basin. While many modern historians regard his story as later mythmaking, Phrom has continued to hold cultural significance, being remembered both as a primordial ancestor in later Thai tradition and as a tutelary figure in northern Thailand, particularly in the Mae Sai area.

== Chronological issues ==
The precise chronological placement of his era was long considered uncertain. Earlier scholarship generally dated it to approximately 857–858 CE. Several alternative birth years were also proposed, including 1012, 1089, and 1112. These chronological reconstructions, however, were founded upon an erroneous identification of the Tertiary Era system employed in the Legend of Singhanavati with the Chulasakkarat era. This misidentification led to the anachronistic attribution of territorial control by later rulers of the dynasty to the 10th–11th centuries, overlapping with the reigns of the Ngoenyang Kingdom’s monarchs who governed the same region.

More recent scholarship has demonstrated that the Secondary Era and Tertiary Era referenced in the legend correspond instead to the Buddhist era (BE) and the Shaka era (SE), respectively. On the basis of this revised interpretation, Phrom’s historical period is therefore more plausibly situated in the 4th to 5th centuries CE.

According to the Legend of Singhanavati, Phrom was born in 283 Shaka era (SE), corresponding to 361 CE, and is said to have died at the age of 77. On the basis of this stated lifespan, his death may be calculated as occurring in 360 SE (438 CE). The same text, however, explicitly records his death in 456 SE, a date that would imply an implausible lifespan of 173 years. This discrepancy is most plausibly attributable to scribal or numerical errors arising from repeated manuscript transmission. The legend further states that he ruled at Chai Prakan for 59 years, indicating an accession date of 301 SE (379 CE).

== Biography ==
Phrom, originally named Phromkuman, was born in 361 CE to Bhrngaraja and Devi. His father, Bhrngaraja, was the ruler of the Yonok Kingdom, which lost its principal center following an uprising led by the vassal ruler of Umongasela, Phraya Khom, in 357 CE, two years after Pangkharaj’s accession to the throne. As a consequence of this rebellion, Pangkharaj was banished to Vieng Si Tuag, where Phromkuman was subsequently born.

At the age of 16, Phromkuman urged his father to discontinue the payment of tribute to Phraya Khom. According to traditional accounts, Phraya Khom later advanced his forces toward Vieng Si Tuag, where Phromkuman confronted him in battle. Renowned for his exceptional martial abilities, Phromkuman is said to have defeated Phraya Khom in single combat atop war elephants, thereby reclaiming the capital and restoring the throne to his father. Following this victory, Bhrngaraja offered Phromkuman the kingship; however, he declined the offer. Bhrngaraja thereafter resumed his reign, and upon his abdication the throne was transferred to the elder prince, Duhkhita, in 422 CE.

To counter further external threats, Phromkuman led a military campaign against Khom forces, advancing as far as the region of territory of Kamphaeng Phet. In conjunction with this campaign, he established a fortified settlement named Umongasela as a defensive outpost, which was later renamed Wiang Chai Prakan, located in present-day Wiang Chai District, Chiang Rai Province, upstream along the Kok River. During his reign, Phrom is credited with the construction of numerous temples throughout the Kok River basin, including Wat Mae Ngon and Wat Phra That Sop Fang, and tradition attributes to him the enshrinement of sacred relics within the chedi of Wat Phra That Chom Kitti. He ruled Wiang Chai Prakan for 59 years and died at the age of 77, after which he was succeeded by his only son, Chaiyasiri, in 438 CE.

== Assumption ==
Phrom’s historicity is not accepted by many contemporary Thai historians, who regard him as a legendary figure rather than a historical person. They argue that his narrative represents a constructed heroic tradition within the Singhanavati region, likely influenced by earlier myths surrounding Thao Hung (also known as Khun Chueang), a widespread folk or culture hero in the Kok River basin. With the later predominance of Buddhism over animistic belief systems, the figure of Phra Phrom was incorporated into this tradition, eventually giving rise to a new body of folklore that introduced a royal persona to assert symbolic supremacy over other local rulers.

Nevertheless, early Western accounts from the Ayutthaya period—such as those by Jeremias van Vliet, Guy Tachard, and Simon de La Loubère—record that many inhabitants of Ayutthaya regarded Phrom as their "primordial monarch". Among the Ayutthaya elite, he was also believed to be an ancestral figure of Uthong, the founder and first ruler of the Ayutthaya Kingdom.

In the present day, Phrom continues to hold cultural significance in northern Thailand. A monument commemorating him is being constructed in front of the Mae Sai District Office in Chiang Rai Province, traditionally identified as the site of Singhanavati. Among local communities, he is venerated as a pioneering figure and tutelary deity of Mae Sai, with annual rituals and commemorative ceremonies held in his honor.

== See also ==
- Phra Ruang – another legendary king in Thai history
- Khun Borom – the legendary king is associated with Khun Chueang

Phrom House of Singhanavati Born: 361 Died: 438
Regnal titles
| Preceded by Phraya Khom | King of Yonok at Fang; 379–438 | Succeeded by Chaiyasiri |
