= Yonok Kingdom =

Thai semi-legendary kingdom

Yonok Nakhon Chaiburi Ratchathani Si Chang Saen
- 673 BCE–467 CE
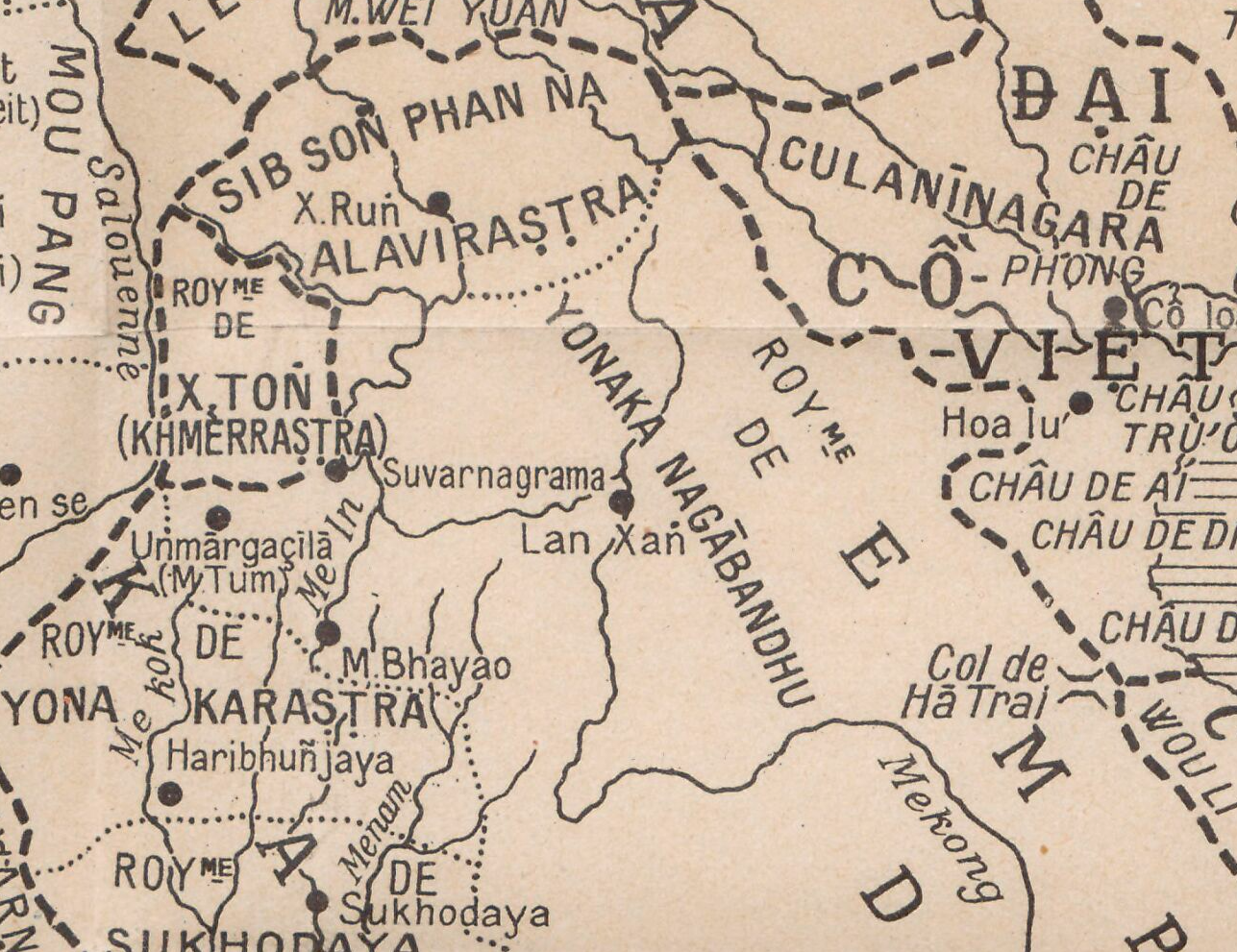
- A map created by French scholars illustrating the territories of Royaume de Yona Karastra and Royaume de Yonaka Nagābandhu or the Yonok Kingdom.
- Status: Semi-legendary kingdom
- Capital: Chiang Saen
- Government: Monarchy
  - 673–572 BCE (first): Singhanavati
  - 355–422 CE: Bhrngaraja
  - 379–444 CE: Phrom
  - 422–438 CE: Duhkhita
  - 459–467 CE (last): Mahavijaya
- History
  - Establishment: 673 BCE
  - Annexation of Umonkasela: 669 BCE
  - Revolt of Umongasela: 357 CE
  - Invasion by Thaton: 444 CE
  - Kamphaeng Phet established: 444 CE
  - Fall of Yonok: 467 CE
  - Formation of Wiang Prueksa: 556 CE
Preceded by
Milakkhu chiefdoms
Souvannakhomkham
Umongasela
Succeeded by
Wiang Prueksa

The Yonok Kingdom, also known as Singhanati, was a semi-legendary polity based along the Kok River, centered at Yonok Nakhon Chaiburi Ratchathani Si Chang Saen (Northern Thai: ᩰᨿᨶᩫ᩠ᨠᨶᨣᩬᩁᨩᩱ᩠ᨿᨷᩩᩁᩦᩁᩣ᩠ᨩᨵᩣᨶᩦᩆᩕᩦᨩ᩶ᩣ᩠ᨦᩯᩈ᩠᩵ᨶ; โยนกนครไชยบุรีราชธานีศรีช้างแส่น) in present-day Chiang Saen district in northern Thailand. It can be considered one of the oldest Tai-speaking kingdom in Thailand. The area has been inhabited since the Neolithic, though no direct link has been established between those communities and the later polities. Legend places Austroasiatic-speaking peoples there before Yonok, together with the earlier legendary kingdom of Souvannakhomkham.

In the legend Yonok was founded by Singhanavati, a son of King Devakala, after a migration into the Chiang Saen area. The new kingdom absorbed the surrounding settlements and extended its influence widely. The account that follows is one of long stability and of sustained royal patronage of Buddhism.

Yonok declined after a revolt by one of its vassals and was destroyed in the 5th century by an earthquake that submerged the capital. Its people dispersed into successor states, among them Wiang Prueksa and Ngoenyang, the second of which led to the Lan Na Kingdom. Chris Baker and Pasuk Phongpaichit summarise the same legend as one continuous movement. A Tai chief's son comes from the north, displaces some Lawa and founds Yonok, probably at Chiang Saen; his descendants, harried by people who may have been Mongols, flee south down the Kok River and found Fang, then cross a low watershed into the Ping valley and found Chiang Rai in 1263, moving on towards Chiang Mai later in the century. Southern offshoots of the Yonok lineage are also associated in later traditions with the early political development of the Chao Phraya Basin.

== History ==
=== Early settlements ===
Habitation in the present-day Chiang Saen district goes back to the Neolithic, but nothing yet found links those communities either to the wider prehistoric record or to the later settlements of northern Thailand. A few prehistoric artefacts have been tentatively associated with Haripuñjaya, a connection that awaits further work. Before Singhanavati, the legends have the region inhabited by Austroasiatic-speaking peoples, chiefly the Khmu and Lawa peoples. The chief polity before Yonok is given as the legendary kingdom of Souvannakhomkham, on the left bank of the Mekong opposite present-day Chiang Saen. After it sank into the river its ruling line is said to have moved to Umongasela (อุโมงคเสลา), in what is now the Fang area.

=== Kingdom establishment ===
The legend makes Yonok the foundation of Singhanavati, younger son of King Devakala (เทวกาล), ruler of the Ho (ฮ่อ) at Rajgir. Thai scholars have identified Rajgir with modern Dali in Yunnan, a region which, during the period in question, lay within the sphere of influence of the Kunming Yi (lit. 'Kunming Barbarian')—a multi-tribal alliance associated with branches of the Di-Qiang peoples—as well as the ancient state of Tsen (8th–2nd century BCE), and the latter ancient tribal confederation known as Ngai-Lao or Ailao (5th century BCE–77 CE). In the late 1st millennium, Six Zhao–a confederation of six regional lordships, were formed, five of which are recorded as being composed of Tai speaking Lao or Lao-related tribal groups–and later became Nanzhao.

His elder brother Bimbisara was made crown prince, and Singhanavati and his twenty-eight siblings were sent out to find territories of their own. At eighteen he moved south-east with a princess and a reported following of 100,000, crossing the Sarapu River (สาระพู) and several others. The journey took four months and ended at what is now Chiang Saen, where the site is described as holding the ruins of the earlier kingdom of Souvannakhomkham. There he established his domain. From the dates the legend preserves, the foundation has been calculated to 637 BCE. (Note: A detailed presentation of the calculations is provided in the table of rulers below.)

Under Singhanavati, Yonok campaigned against Umongasela, a successor of Souvannakhomkham to the south-west, and annexed it. The first five years of the reign are given over to consolidation and to bringing the region's existing settlements together. His authority is described as reaching the Nam Tae River (น้ำแท้) in the east, the Maenam Kong (แม่น้ำคง) in the west, the Nong Sae region (หนองแส) in the north, and Lavarath (ลวรัฐ; lit. 'land of Lawa people') near the mouth of the Ping River in the south. Thai scholars have identified these toponyms respectively with the regions of the Black River, the Salween River, Erhai Lake, and the Chao Phraya River basin.

After that expansion the reign is portrayed as settled, with no conflict recorded within or without. The text presents the duties of Singhanavati and several successors as chiefly the promotion and upkeep of Buddhism. That emphasis is strongest in the reigns of Achutraraj and his son Mangrai Naraj. Royal intermarriage with Lawa communities at Doi Tung is recorded under the third monarch, Achutraraj (พญาอชุตราช).

=== Revolt of Umongasela ===
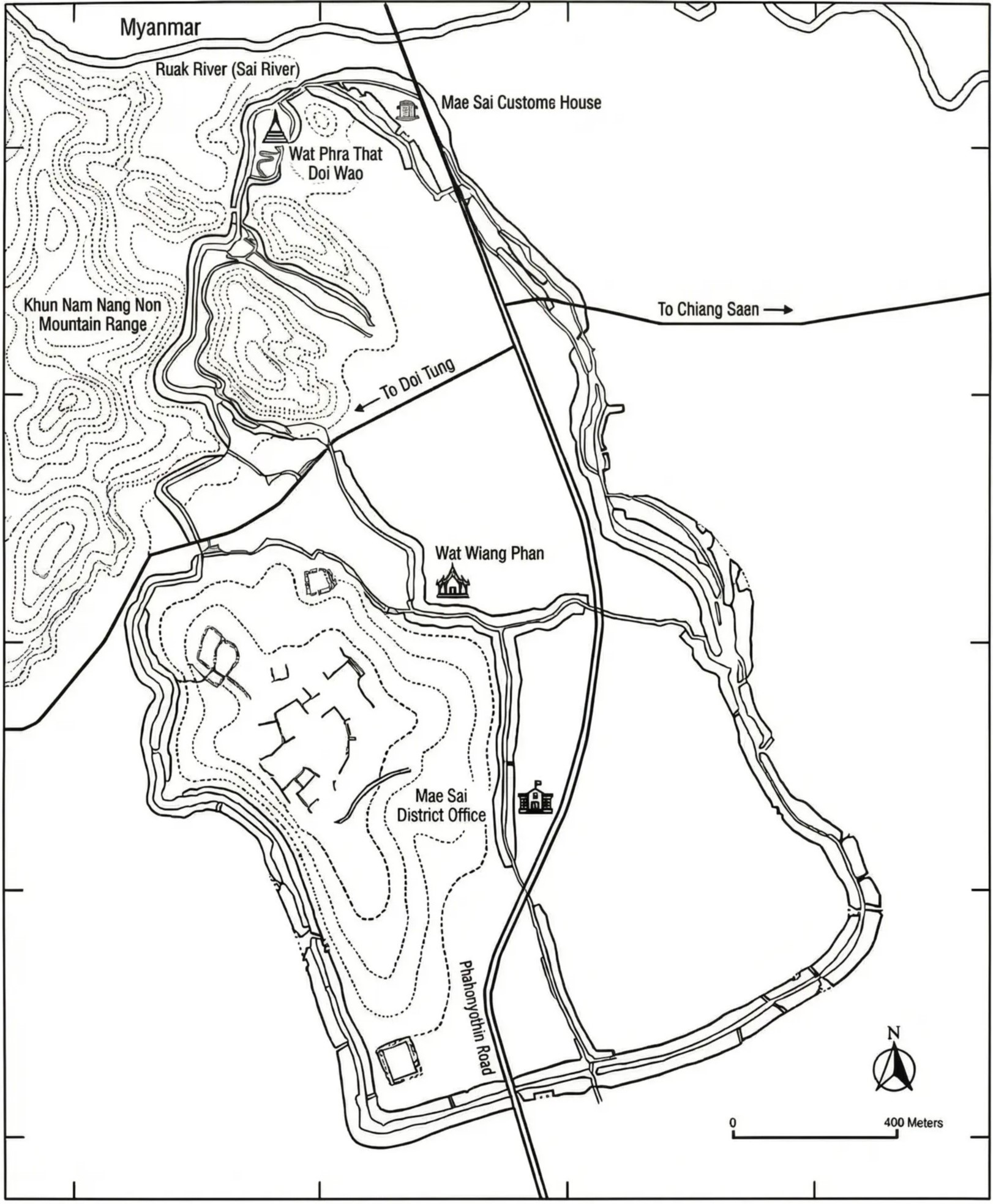
City layout of the ancient Wiang Phang Kham, a moated site measuring approx. 1.5 by 7.0 kilometers, which served as a base for Bhrngaraja and his two sons in their campaign to retake Yonok.

After a long peace and a deep investment in Buddhist institutions, Yonok was shaken in the reign of Bhrngaraja by a revolt of its vassal at Umongasela. Taking advantage of the king's youth, the Khom ruler of Umongasela is said to have marched on Yonok in 357. Bhrngaraja was deposed after two years and exiled to Wiang Si Thuang (เวียงศรีทวง; present-day Wiang Phang Kham, Mae Sai district), a tributary polity of Yonok. In exile he fathered two sons, Duhkhita and Phrom. Phrom took Yonok back in 397 and restored his father to the throne. He is credited with pursuing the defeated forces south as far as present-day Kamphaeng Phet. In the former Umongasela territory he founded a frontier town, Chai Prakan, and governed there after the campaigns ended.

=== Fall of Yonok ===
The last king was Maha Chaichana (มหาชัยชนะ), in whose reign an earthquake in 467 submerged Yonok beneath Chiang Saen Lake. The survivors under Khun Lung moved east and settled at Wiang Prueksa, and the fourteen remaining chiefdoms formed an assembly to choose their rulers, an elective system that lasted 93 years. The legend records four earlier earthquakes in the reign of the founder Singhanavati, the most severe in his fifty-seventh year.

A generation earlier, in 444, Chaiyasiri of Chai Prakan, son of Phrom, faced a month-long invasion by the Mon kingdom of Thaton. Unable to fall back on Yonok, cut off by flooding and outmatched in the field, he led some 100,000 families south along the Yom River to the southern edge of Yonok territory in the Chao Phraya basin and founded a settlement later identified as Kamphaeng Phet. He ruled there until his death in 457, after which the southern line disappears from the record. Two centuries later, Chinese sources—the Tang Huiyao and Cefu Yuangui—mention this area as the location of the Duō Miè Kingdom, situated west of Tou Yuan with a proposed center at Lopburi; the annals give it thirty cities, a large population, independence from its neighbours, and the practice of Buddhism. By the mid-8th century, the area came to be known as Indaprasthanagara, (Note: As says in the Ayutthaya Testimonies that Indaprasthanagara was in the Phraek Si Racha historical region.) with Padumasuriyavamsa claimed in later traditions as its first Siamese monarch, from whom the lineage of Visnuraja of Phraek Si Racha, a progenitor of the Sukhothai and Ayutthaya monarchs, further asserts descent.

After the fall of Yonok, records of 638 show highland communities at Doi Tung, formerly a Yonok tributary, gathering under Lao Chakkaraj, who later became the ruler of Wiang Prueksa in 648. He rebuilt Wiang Phang Kham under the name Hiran, which is taken to mark the beginning of the Ngoenyang Kingdom. Ngoenyang held through successive generations and issued at the end of the 13th century in the Lan Na Kingdom.

To the south, in the same period, the hermit Sudeva founded Haripuñjaya in the Ping River valley in 629 and in 662 invited the Mon princess Camadevi from Lavo to rule it, which carried Lavo's influence north.

== Singhanati clan and the Siamese ==
Manit Vallipodom's reading of 1973 equated the Tertiary Era of the legend with the Chula Sakarat era, which placed the later Singhanavati monarchs, Chaiyasiri above all, in the 10th century. Since the legend has Chaiyasiri move to the Chao Phraya River valley, that chronology led earlier Thai scholars to make him the ancestor of Uthong, first king of the Ayutthaya Kingdom, by equating him with the legendary Saenpom or with Phanom Thale Sri of the Phetchaburi dynasty. Each of those figures has a son named Uthong in the traditional accounts: Uthong III of the Suphannaphum line for Saenpom, and Uthong II of the Lavo dynasty in the case of Phanom Thale Sri. The same equation made Chaiyasiri the founder of the Phrip Phri Kingdom.

Both identifications have since been shown to be wrong. The Ayutthaya Testimonies name Phanom Thale Sri as an elder son of Anuraja, a ruler of an early Siamese polity in the Phraek Si Racha region, and Uthong of Ayutthaya is securely attested as a son of Baramaraja, a distinct figure from the sons of Saenpom and Phanom Thale Sri. Vallipodom's equation of the Tertiary Era with the Chula Sakarat has itself been challenged, notably by Phiset Chiachanphong, who identifies it with the Shaka era instead. That reading puts Chaiyasiri in the 5th century rather than the 10th.

== Rulers ==
=== Chronological issues and calendrical systems ===
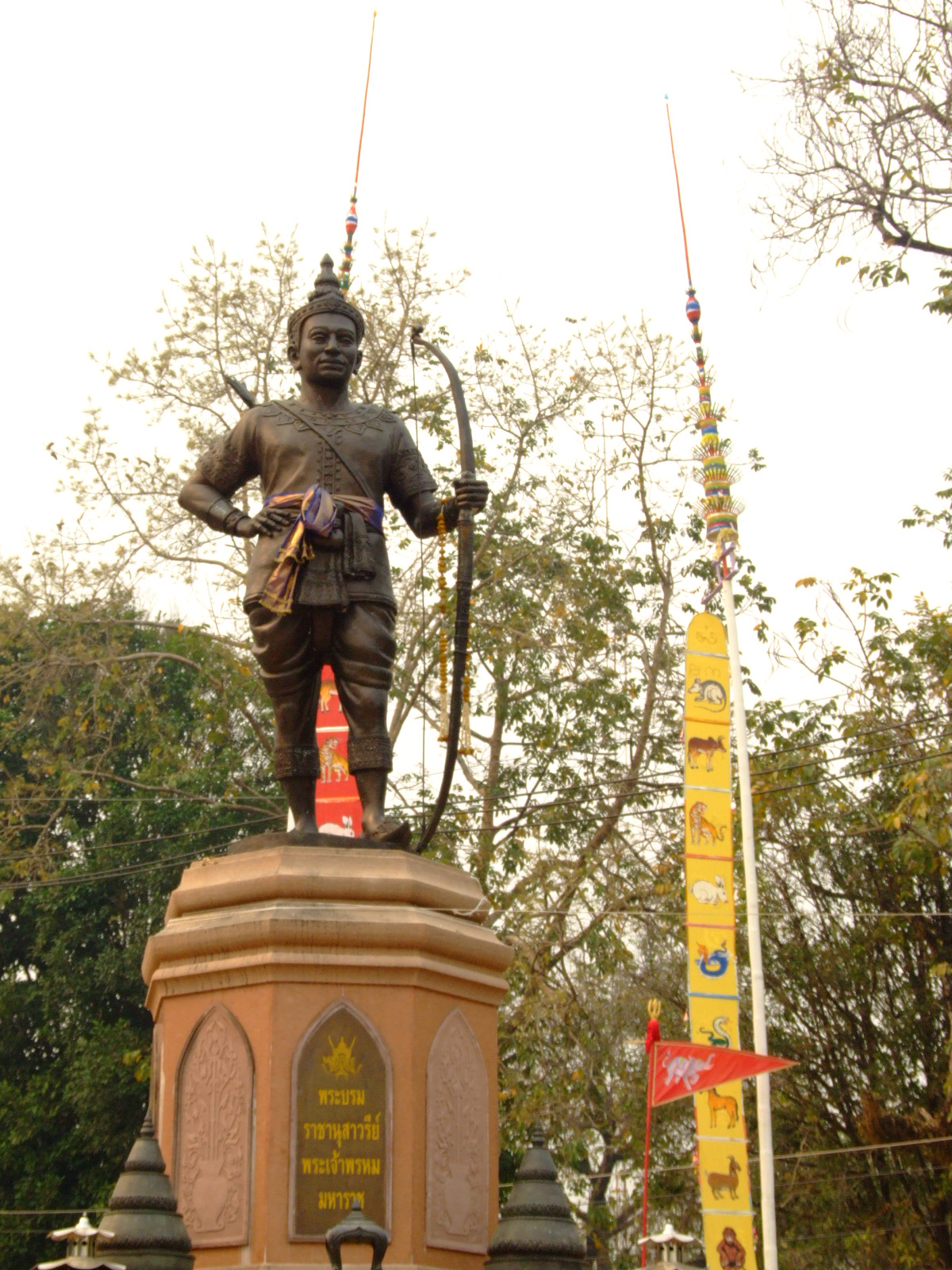
King Phrom memorial in Mae Sai district, northernmost of Thailand.

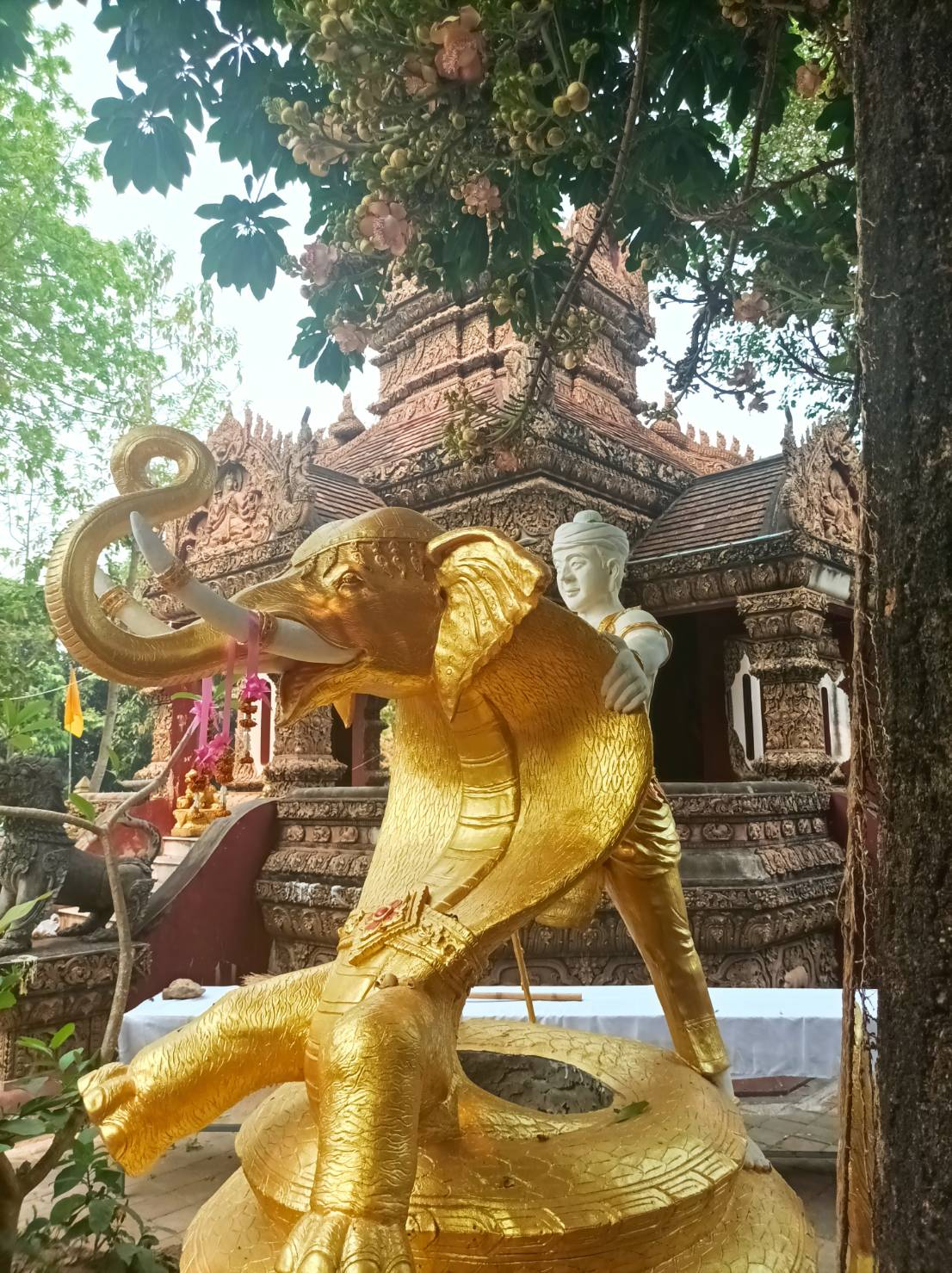
Sculpture depicting King Duhkhita riding a naga elephant.

The narrative preserved in the original text employs multiple calendrical era systems, a feature that has given rise to significant interpretative difficulties among earlier scholars. Most notably, Manit Vallipodom equated the Tertiary Era referenced in the text with the Chula Sakarat era. This identification resulted in the placement of the later Singhanavati monarchs in the 11th century CE, thereby creating a chronological overlap between territories attributed to the Singhanavati lineage and those known to have been under the control of Ngoenyang during the same period. Furthermore, Vallipodom introduced an additional ruler, King Mang Saen (พระองค์มังแสน), in order to bridge perceived gaps in the dynastic sequence between Mang Sing (มังสิง) and Mang Som (มังสม); however, this figure is not attested in the original text.

In contrast, the Secondary Era is explicitly defined in the text in a manner that closely corresponds to the Buddhist Era. This identification is supported by the statement that its second monarch, Phanthati (พญาพันธติ), died in the same year as the Buddha, after which the year count recommenced at one with the accession of the third monarch, Achutraraj (พญาอชุตราช). This chronological framework is applied consistently throughout the reigns of Geng, Ping, Kom, and Duhkhita, for whom the regnal years recorded in the text correspond directly to Buddhist Era dates cited in the same passages.

With regard to the Tertiary Era, Phiset Chiachanphong has proposed that it should instead be identified with the Shaka era. When these two propositions—namely, the equation of the Secondary Era with the Buddhist Era and the identification of the Tertiary Era with the Shaka era—are applied conjointly, the resulting chronology remains internally consistent. In particular, during the reigns of King Fan and King Wan, the text records the abandonment of the earlier era system and the institution of a new one; when these dates are converted into the Common Era, the transition occurs without any chronological discontinuity. However, this presupposition results in an almost century-long temporal gap between Yonok and its successor polity, Wiang Prueksa, a conclusion that contradicts the context preserved in the original text, which suggests a seamless transition.

The apparent discontinuity described above is more plausibly attributable to scribal errors arising from successive copying, as is clearly demonstrated by inconsistencies in the regnal chronology. According to the text, Maha Wan succeeded Duhkhita directly; however, while the terminal year of Duhkhita’s reign is recorded as 349, that of Maha Wan is given as 469, implying an implausible interval of more than a century between two successive reigns. This discrepancy is further contradicted by the narrative itself, which explicitly states that Maha Wan reigned for only 21 years. The problem becomes even more explicit in the case of Maha Chaichana, who is said to have succeeded Maha Wan directly, yet whose terminal year is recorded as 376. This date not only precedes the terminal year assigned to Maha Wan but also represents a chronological regression within an otherwise linear sequence of reigns, rendering the regnal chronology internally incoherent. If the terminal dates of Maha Wan’s reign and that of Chaiyasiri, both recorded as ending in 469 SE, are accepted as accurate, the apparent chronological hiatus between Yonok and its successor polity, Wiang Prueksa, disappears. This adjustment, however, would require the reigns of the remaining monarchs to be shifted forward by nearly a century relative to the dates preserved in the text.

=== List of rulers ===
The following section enumerates the rulers of the Yonok Kingdom and the durations of their reigns.

Color legend

Prathama Era (โบราณศักราช; lit. 'Ancient Era'), counted from year 1 at the birth of King Singhanavati, known as the Anjana Era
Dvitīya Era (ทุติยศักราช; lit. 'Secondary Era'), equated with the Buddhist Era (BE)
Tṛtīya Era (ตติยศักราช; lit. 'Tertiary Era'), equated with the Shaka Era (SE)

Name		Reign length		Period			
Romanized	Thai	Total years	Age	Years provided in original text		Interpretation by Manit Vallipodom (Buddhist Era)	Legendary years in the Buddhist Era (BE) or Shaka era (SE) converted to the Common Era (CE)
Romanized	Thai	Total years	Age	Legendary Era	Buddhist Era	Interpretation by Manit Vallipodom (Buddhist Era)	Legendary years in the Buddhist Era (BE) or Shaka era (SE) converted to the Common Era (CE)
Singhanavati	พญาสิงหนติ	101 or 52	18–120 or 18–70	18–119 or 18–69		431–?	673–572 BCE or 624–572 BCE
Phanthati	พญาพันธติ	29	42–71	?–148 or 98	?–1	532–?	572–543 BCE
Ashutaraja	พญาอชุตราช	100	20–120?	1–?	1–100	561–?	543–444 BCE
Ajatashatru	พระยาอชาตศัตรู	100	20–120?	1–?	1–100	561–?	543–444 BCE
Mangrai Naraj	พญามังรายนราช	52	46–97		100–?	660–?	444–392 BCE
Cheung	พระองค์เชือง	31	58–89	?–183		712–?	392–361 BCE
Chuen	พระองค์ชืน	17	61–78	?–200		743–?	361–344 BCE
Kham	พระองค์คำ	17	58–75	?–216		760–?	344–328 BCE
Geng	พระองค์เกิง	2	56–58	?–218	?–218	776–?	328–326 BCE
Gengthirat	พระองค์เกิงธิราช	58	42–100	?–276		778–?	326–268 BCE
Chat	พระองค์ชาต	20	71–90	?–295		836–?	268–249 BCE
Wao	พระองค์เวา	19	62–81	?–313		855–?	249–231 BCE
Waen	พระองค์แวน	17	63–80	?–329		873–?	231–215 BCE
Kaew	พระองค์แก้ว	15	58–72	?–343		889–?	215–201 BCE
Ngeon	พระองค์เงิน	15	56–71	?–357		930–?	201–187 BCE
Waen II	พระองค์แวนที่ 2	16	52–67	?–372		917–?	187–172 BCE
Ngam	พระองค์งาม	33	50–83	?–450 (✓405?)		932–?	172–193 BCE
Lue	พระองค์ลือ	25	66–83	?–430		965–?	193–114 BCE
Roy	พระองค์รอย	15	58–72	?–446		990–?	114–98 BCE
Cheng	พระองค์เชิง	18	52–69	?–463		1006–?	98–81 BCE
Pan	พระองค์พัน	16	56–71	?–468 (✓479?)		1023–?	81–65 BCE
Klao	พระองค์เกลา	17	56–72	?–497		1039–?	65–47 BCE
Ping	พระองค์พิง	19?	52?–71?	?–512 (516?)	?–500–?	1054–?	47–32 BCE
Si	พระองค์สี	17?	54?–70?	?–528 (533?)		1072–?	32–16 BCE
Som	พระองค์สม	14?	52?–66?	?–540 (542?)		1088–?	16–4 BCE
Suan	พระองค์สวน	18	50–69	?–560		1002–?	4 BCE–17 CE
Phaeng	พระองค์แฟง	20	48–69	?–581		1120–?	17–38 CE
Puan	พระองค์พวน	12	53–65	?–593		1141–?	38–50 CE
Fu	พระองค์ฟู	12	36–47	?–615 (✓605?)		1153–?	50–62 CE
Fan	พระองค์ฝั้น	17	30–47	?–622		1165–?	62–79 CE
The earlier era system ceased to be used in 622 following the death of King Fan, at which point a new era system was instituted.
Wan	พระองค์วัน	50	17–67	?–50	?–671	1182–?	79–128 CE
Mang Sing	พระองค์มังสิง	50	35–85	?–100	?–722	1231–?	129–178
Mang Saen (Note: King Mang Saen does not appear in the original text, and is instead introduced in the research reconstruction proposed by Manit Vallipodom.)	พระองค์มังแสน	25	55–80	—	—	1281–?	—
Mang Som	พระองค์มังสม	8	72–79	?–134		1306–?	178–212
Thip	พระองค์ทิพ	17	51–67	?–150		1315–?	212–228
Kom	พระองค์กม	5 (✓28?)	43?–47?	?–178	?–800	1331–?	228–256
Chay	พระองค์ชาย	20	30–50	?–197		1359–?	256–275
Chin	พระองค์ชิน	15	32–46	?–211		1378–?	275–289
Chom	พระองค์ชม	19	29–48	?–230		1392–?	289–308
Pang	พระองค์พัง	16	28–44	?–245		1411–?	308–323
Ping II	พระองค์พิงที่ 2	15	26–42	245–259		1426–?	323–337
Piang	พระองค์เพียง	17	24–42	259–?		1440–?	337–355
Bhrngaraja	พระเจ้าพังคราช	2	18–20	?–279	?–900	1458–?	355–357
The text indicates that Yonok was under the control of the Khom of Umongkasela for approximately 19 years. However, the interval between the first and second reigns of Bhrngaraja at Yonok exceeds this duration, extending to roughly 40 years.
Bhrngaraja	Ruled at Vien Si Tuang			?–280–?		—N/a	357–397
Bhrngaraja	2nd reign at Yonok	25	?–76 (✓86?)	?–344			397–422
Duhkhita	พระเจ้าทุกขิตะ	16	55–70	?–349 (✓360?)	?–968–?	1515–?	422–438
Maha Wan	มหาวรรณ	21	46–67	?–469 (✓381?)		1530–?	438–459
Maha Chaichana	มหาชัยชนะ	8	42–49	?–376 (✓389?)		1550–1558	459–467
Reign of Maha Chaichana was marked by the fall of Yonok.
Phrom	พระเจ้าพรหมมหาราช	59	?–77	?–456 (✓360) (Note: According to the original text, Phrom was born to Bhrngaraja in 283 and died at the age of 77. However, the same source records his year of death as 456, which would imply an implausible lifespan of 173 years. If the legendary account stating that he died at the age of seventy-seven is accepted, his year of death should instead be calculated as 360 rather than 456.)			Chai Prakan: 379–438
Chaiyasiri	พระเจ้าชัยศิริ	21	48–67	?–366–469 (✓379) (Note: Given that the corrected year of death of his father is 360, which also marks the year in which Chaiyasiri succeeded his father at the age of 48, and considering that Chaiyasiri is said to have died at the age of 67, his year of death should be calculated as 379 rather than 469, as stated in the original text.)			Chai Prakan: 438–444; Kamphaeng Phet: 444–457
