= Lao Chong =

Semi-legendary king of Ngoenyang

Lao Chong: ᩃᩣ᩠ᩅᨧᩫ᩠ᨦ
- Lavachangkaraja
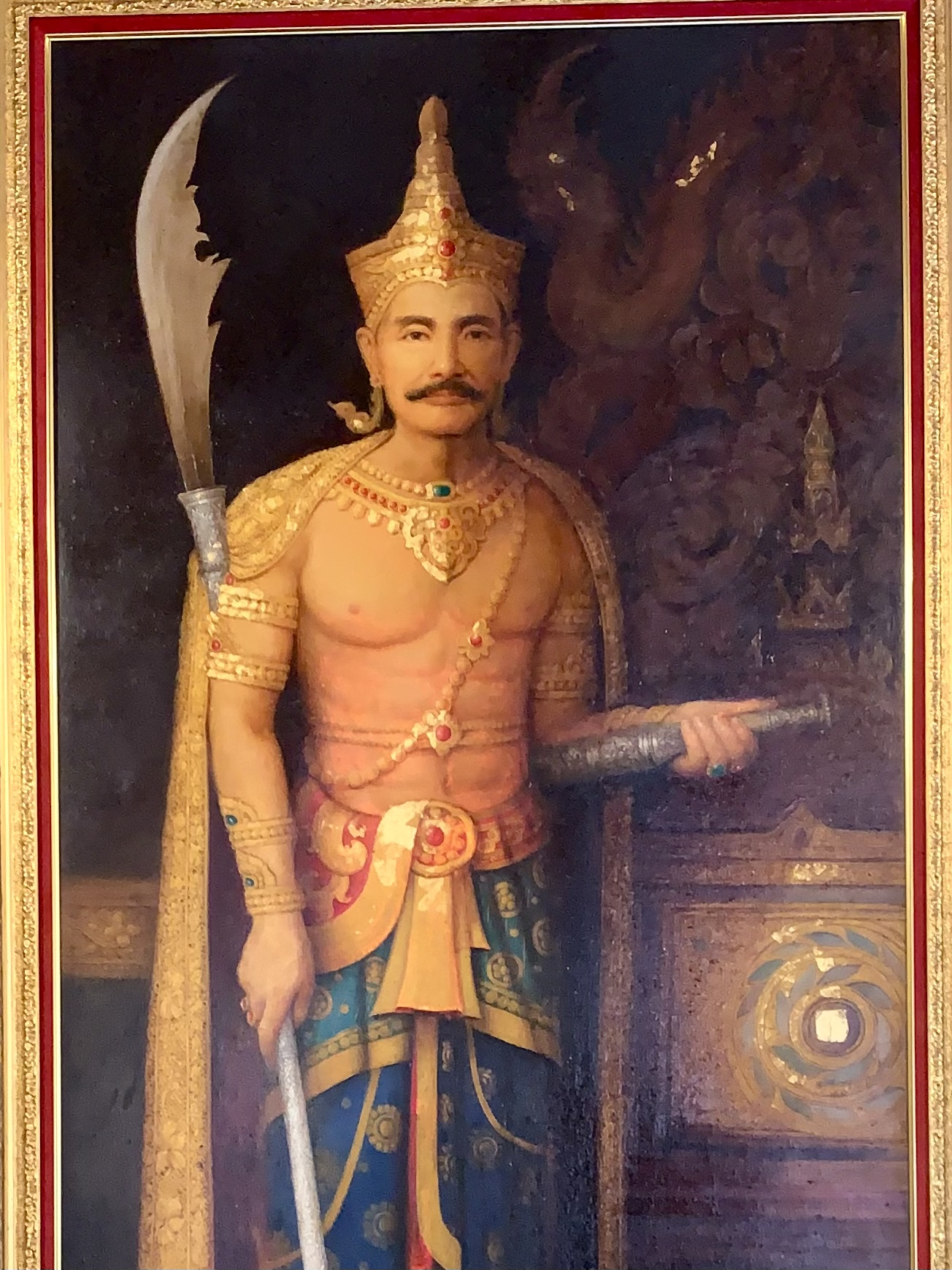
- Mural of Lao Chakkaraj at Wat Ming Mueang, Chiang Rai province, Thailand

King of Ngoenyang
- Reign: 638-758 AD
- Successor: Lao Kao Kaeo Ma Mueang
- Born: Unknown; Doi Tung
- Died: Unknown
- House: Lao

Lao Chong, Lao Jong (Northern Thai: ᩃᩣ᩠ᩅᨧᩫ᩠ᨦ; Thai: ลาวจง), Lao Changkaraj (Thai: ลาวจังกราช), or Lawacangkaraja (Northern Thai: ᩃᩅᨧᩢᨦ᩠ᨠᩁᩣᨩ; Thai: ลวจังกราชะ) also spelt Lawachangkarat, is a semi-legendary first king of Ngoenyang and is regarded as the ancestor of Mangrai. He is considered the first monarch of the Lao dynasty and appears in several traditional chronicles, such as Jinakalamali, Chiang Mai Chronicle, Phayao Chronicle, Chiang Saen Chronicle, Chiang Rai Chronicle, Nan Chronicle and the Yonok Chronicle.

== Identity ==
Historians debate whether Lawachangaraj is the same person as Pu Chao Lao Chok. Srisak Valipodom, believe that Pu Chao Lao Chok is the same person as Lao Chong; thus, Chueang and Mangrai are of Lua lineage due to being his descendants.

Aphichit Sirichai, meanwhile, said that Lao Chong and Lao Chok are different people. Pu Chao Lao Chok is a Lua Chief from 561 BE (c. 1104) who ruled the Lua tribe of Doi Tung, while Lao Chong, regarded as the first king of the Lao dynasty, ascended the throne of Chiang Lao in Chula Sakarat 1, or 1181 BE (c. 1724). Therefore, the two must be different individuals from different historical periods.

== Legends ==
Lao Chong was a legendary founder of Ngoenyang as a new chief center in 638 CE, following his participation in the establishment of the Chula Sakarat era by Kakabhadra of Nakhon Pathom.

Legends contained within several Northern Thai Manuscripts recounts that when King Anuruddha of Pagan convened the monarchs of neighbouring cities to establish a new era, the rulers along the Kok River had no king. Thus, Indra sent a Devaputra named Lawachanga Devaputra, mentioned by the Ngeonyang Chiang Saen Chronicle and Phayao Chronicle to be the reincarnation of Pu Chao Lao Chok, down to earth via a “silver ladder” from Mount Yugundhara, descending to the Doi Tung area beneath a jujube tree. Standing on a silver platform below the tree, the deity transformed into a human form. The people of Wiang Prueaksa then proclaimed him the first monarch. Another version identifies him as the leader of a Tai tribe that migrated from the “Chok” region (southern China).

Aphichit Sirichai explained that after the fall of Yonok, a group of survivors led by Lao Chong went on to establish the fortified city of Chiang Lao. However, for someone of unknown origin, without lineage or background, to ascend the throne as king, it was necessary to enhance his legitimacy. As a result, the legend constructs a narrative explaining that Lao Chong descended by climbing down a celestial ladder from the Trāyastriṃśa heaven. However, the Jinakalamali, a source composed during the Lan Na period around the early 2000s BE (c. 1457s), didn't mention the celestial ladder; instead, it states only that he was an opapātika, which refers to the fact that Lao Chong survived the collapse of the Yonok City, an event in which more than 90 percent of the population perished. He was thus regarded as one who had been "reborn", which granted him the legitimacy to establish himself as king of a new dynasty.

In legends associated with Doi Tung, Pu Chao Lao Chok is said to have had deep faith in Buddhism. When the Buddha journeyed through the Doi Din Daeng or Doi Tung area, Lao Chok offered alms to him.

== Lao Dynasty ==
Later, Lao Chong sent his sons to rule over various cities, including Chiang Khong, Yong, Chiang Lao, and Ngoenyang (Hiran Ngoenyang or Chiang Saen). The dynasty he established, known as the Lao Dynasty, would later expand across the Mekong and Chaophraya basin. The dynasty and its descendants would come to rule many polities such as Ngeonyang, Phayao Kingdom, Nan Kingdom, Mueang Sua, Vientiane, Mueang Phuan, and Sipsongpanna. One of his descendants, Mangrai, established the Mangrai Dynasty which ruled Lan Na until 1578 and Chiang Tung until 1959.
