= Wiang Prueksa =

Historical Thai polity, 556–648

- 556–648 CE
- Status: Semi-legendary Kingdom
- Government: Elective monarchy
- Monarch
  - 556–564 (first): Khun Lang
  - 635–648 (last): Khun Suk
- Historical era: Ancient history
  - Fall of Yonok: 467
  - Establishment: 556
  - Formation of Ngoenyang: 638
  - Merged into Ngoenyang: 648
Preceded by	Succeeded by
Yonok Nakhon	Ngoenyang

Wiang Prueksa (also spelled Wiang Pueksa; Thai: เวียงปรึกษา), also known as Wiang Chiang Saen Noi (เวียงเชียงแสนน้อย), was an ancient polity of the Tai Yuan people, centered at Ban Sop Kham (บ้านสบคำ), in present-day Chiang Saen District, Chiang Rai Province, Thailand. It comprised a number of settlements that survived the fall of the Yonok Kingdom, traditionally attributed to earthquakes in the late 5th century.

In the mid 7th century, the Tai Yuan people of Wiang Prueksa invited Lao Chakkaraj, a leader of the Lawa people from Doi Tung, to become their new ruler. After ascending the throne, Lao Chakkaraj constructed a new city at Mae Sai and established it as his principal center under the name Hiran Nakhon, marking the beginning of the Ngoenyang Kingdom. This polity later developed into the Lan Na Kingdom, which was formally established in 1292 during the reign of King Mangrai the Great.

== History ==
Following the fall of Yonok Nakhon and the end of the Singhanati dynasty in the 6th century, a group of survivors led by Khun Lang, together with Khun Phanna and other community leaders, migrated east of the former Yonok capital to establish a new settlement on the western bank of the Mekong River. This settlement became known as Wiang Pueksa or Wiang Prueksa, also referred to as Wiang Chiang Saen Noi (Little Chiang Saen).

The ruler of Wiang Pueksa was not selected through hereditary succession but through public consultation, a process known as pueksa (ปรึกษา; lit. 'consultation'). According to the chronicles, the inhabitants collectively chose their leader, following principles resembling a proto-democratic system, in which each settlement appointed its own governor. In total, sixteen rulers of Wiang Pueksa are recorded in the traditional accounts.

During the same broad period, a new political center emerged in the Doi Tung region under Lao Chakkaraj, regarded as the first ruler of Hiran Ngoenyang Chiang Lao. Lao Chakkaraj consolidated surrounding settlements to form this polity and founded the Lao dynasty, which later became the royal lineage of King Mangrai, the founder of the Lan Na Kingdom.

== List of Rulers ==
The list of rulers is derived from the Legend of Singhanati. However, the chronology proposed in the 1973 critical edition of the legend prepared by Manit Vallipodom raises significant historiographical concerns. In this edition, the regnal years of the 16 monarchs are dated between 1558 and 1638 BE (1015–1095 CE), based on Manit's identification of the years given in the original legend with the Chula Sakarat era. This dating conflicts with other textual traditions, which associate Wiang Prueksa with the era of Lao Chakkaraj, whose reign is conventionally placed in the mid-7th century CE, beginning around 638/639 CE. Moreover, during the period proposed by Manit, the Chiang Saen area—the center of Wiang Prueksa—is generally understood to have been in the late phase of Ngoenyang, which itself is regarded as the successor polity to Wiang Prueksa.

Phiset Chiachanphong has proposed instead that the Tṛtīya Era (ตติยศักราช, tertiary era) named in the legend is the Shaka era. On that reading the last reign at Wiang Prueksa coincides with the accession of Lao Chakkaraj; the final column of the table gives the resulting dates.

Name		Reign length (years)	Period		
Romanized	Thai	Reign length (years)	Original legend (Unspecified era)	By Manit Vallipodom (Buddhist Era; BE)	Legendary dates in the SE converted to the CE
Khun Lang	ขุนลัง	11	378–386 (478–486?)	1558–1569	456–464 (556–564?)
Khun Chang	ขุนชาง	7	?–492	1567–1574	?–570
Khun Lan	ขุนลาน	9	?–500	1573–1582	?–578
Khun Than	ขุนทาม	7	?–507	1582–1589	?–585
Khun Tam	ขุนตาม	10	?–516	1588–1598	?–594
Khun Tong	ขุนตน	5	(unmentioned)	1597–1602	
Khun Tim	ขุนติม	7	?–520	1601–1608	?–598
Khun Taeng	ขุนแตง	5	?–530	1607–1612	?–608
Khun Chan	ขุนจัน	4	?–533	1611–1615	?–611
Khun Khong	ขุนคง	5	?–537	1614–1619	?–615
Khun Chom	ขุนจอม	6	?–541	1618–1624	?–619
Khun Chong	ขุนชง	3	(unmentioned)	1622–1625	
Khun Seek	ขุนชิง	3	?–550	1624–1627	?–628
Khun Itthi	ขุนอิทธิ	4	(unmentioned)	1631–1635	
Khun Phattha	ขุนสุทธิ	5	(unmentioned)	1634–1639	
Khun Sukh	ขุนสุข	13?	?–559–?	1638–1651	?–637–?
