= Piang of Yonok =

Legendary ruler of Yonok

Piang

Ruler of Yonok
- Predecessor: Ping II
- Successor: Pang
- Issue: Pang
- Father: Ping II

Piang (Thai: พระองค์เพียง) is a legendary ruler of Yonok mentioned in the Legend of Singhanavati (Thai: ตำนานสิงหนวติกุมาร). According to the chronicle, he succeeded his father, Ping, and was followed by his son, Pang.

== Chronicle account ==
The Legend of Singhanavati states that Piang became ruler of Yonok at the age of 24. It records that he ruled for 17 years and died at the age of 42. His son Pang, who was 18 years old, then succeeded him.

The chronicle states that Pang ruled Yonok for two years before Phraya Khom Dam, the ruler of Umongasela, attacked and captured the city. Pang and his wife were forced to leave Yonok and settle at Wiang Si Thuang, where Pang was required to pay tribute to the new ruler.

According to the same tradition, Pang later had a son named Phrom, who defeated Phraya Khom Dam and recovered Yonok.
