= Coffee production in Thailand =

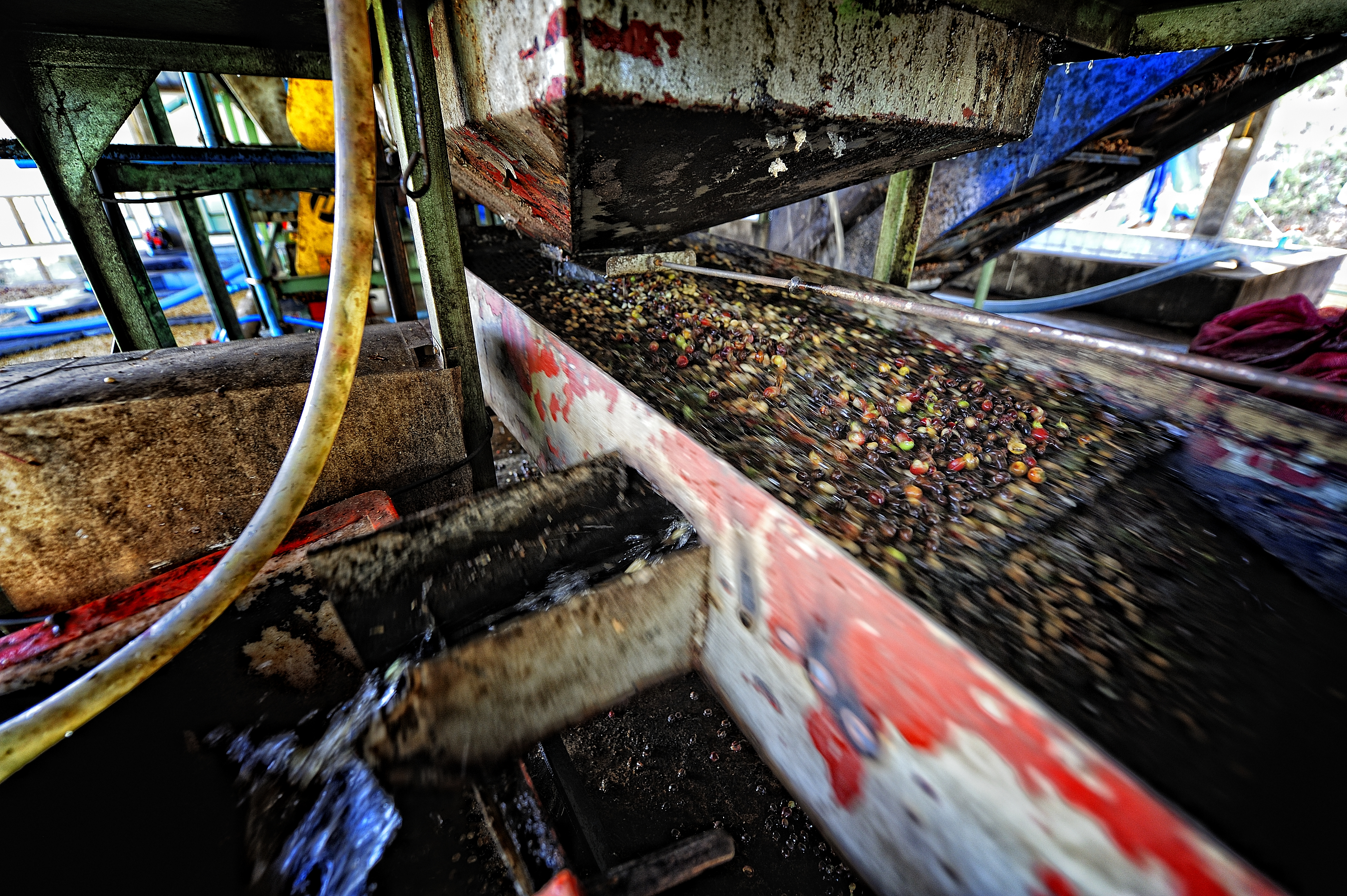
Coffee production, Doi Chang, Thailand

Thailand (formerly Siam) is one of the top 25 coffee producers in the world as of 2014, but its status as a coffee origin has not been widely known. Thailand traditionally produced mainly Robusta for industrial use, but the country has quickly become an exciting emerging origin for specialty Arabica and fine Robusta coffees. The origin is unique in that it exports very little coffee and most of the consumption remains in the country. There is a booming specialty coffee ecosystem where farmers, roasters, cafes and consumers symbiotically co-exist. It is often seen as an example of a working coffee ecosystem for an origin where coffee produced is sustainable from both economic and environmental perspectives.

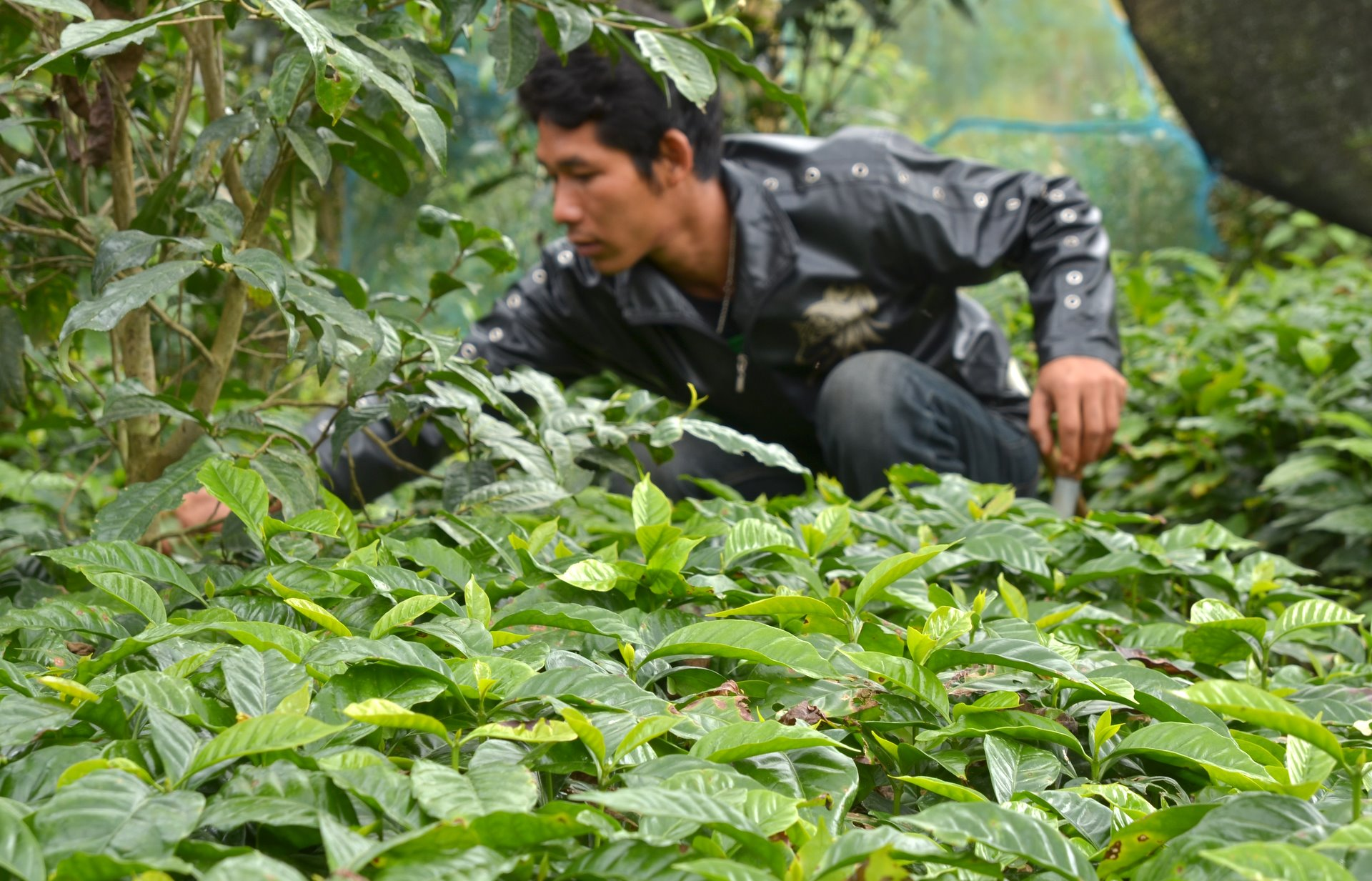
Coffee nursery, Mae Chan District, Chiang Rai Province, Thailand

== History ==
Thailand is a relative late-comer to coffee production. In the 1970s King Bhumibol Adulyadej launched a series of coffee projects in the north to help local communities grow cash crops like coffee as an alternative to growing opium poppies. Thailand became an exporter of coffee in 1976.

== Production ==
In general, Arabica beans are grown in northern Thailand and robusta beans in the south.

Robusta coffee (Coffea canephora) is grown chiefly in the provinces of Chumphon, Surat Thani, Nakhon Si Thammarat, Krabi, Phang Nga, and Ranong. Coffee is cultivated on 67,832 hectares. Coffee production in the southern part of the country is 80,000 tons of robusta coffee. One-quarter of the robusta coffee is for domestic consumption in the form of soluble, roasted, powdered, and tinned coffee.

According to Food and Agriculture Organization (FAO) statistics for 2013, coffee production was 50,000 tons grown on 51,000 hectares. Yield was 980 kilograms per hectare, which placed it at 18th in the world rankings. In 2015, two types of coffee, Doi Tung and Doi Chang, received protected designation of origin (PDO) status from the European Union. The designation is comparable to those bestowed on "Champagne", "Parma ham", or "Bordeaux".

Currently, about 10,000 tons of Arabica and roughly 30,000 tons of Robusta are grown in northern Thailand. Coffee production in the northern border region with Burma and Laos, known as the (Golden Triangle). Arabica coffee is a good variety as its yield is profitable to all categories of farmers, including the hill people. Organic coffee is considered suitable for cultivation in the highlands with an elevation range of 800 metres (2,600 ft) to 1,200 metres (3,900 ft). Coffee is grown both in shaded areas and in open areas in full sun. Intercropping is also practised in hill areas along with fruit trees.

Thailand's import tariffs for coffee are the second highest in the world, making it a pricey endeavor for coffee shops to feature beans from abroad. It is more likely to find a Brazil, Colombia or Ethiopia in a blend together with Thai coffee rather than as a single origin.

== See also ==
- List of countries by coffee production
