= Doi Tung coffee =

Thai coffee variety

- Type: Coffee
- Introduced: Thailand
- Colour: Brown

Doi Tung Coffee is a varietal of Coffea arabica grown in northern Thailand.

== History ==
The Doi Tung varietal of coffee emerged from Thai opium replacement efforts starting in the late 1980s. The mountainous region around Mount Doi Tung in northern Thailand was a very poor, struggling region in which many of the local people made their living by growing opium to sell to Burmese traders. Princess Srinagarindra took an interest in the region, and a development project was set up under which local residents were given land-use titles and encouraged to grow coffee and macadamia nuts. A chain of coffee shops using the Doi Tung name was opened to market Doi Tung coffee to Thais. As production increased, Doi Tung coffee began to be marketed for export. Starting 1 December 2018, it began to be served on Japan Airlines flights, and plans are being made to enter the United States market.

== Characteristics and processing ==
The Doi Tung varietal is a cross of several hybrids: Catimor, Caturra, and Catuai. It is grown within the Nang Non mountain range in Chiang Rai Province, at an elevation of approximately 800-1200 meters. It is described as having "a unique well-balanced taste with fruity sweet frangrance/overtones, generous acidity without sharpness, and a medium body." The coffee beans are processed and roasted locally in the growing region, rather than being sold green for processing elsewhere.

== Protected Geographic Indication (PGI) ==
The Thai government granted a geographical indication to Doi Tung coffee in 2006. The government further applied for PGI status with the European Union in May 2010, which was granted, making Doi Tung coffee the second Thai product (after 'Hom Mali' rice) to hold such status in the EU.

== See also ==
- Coffee production in Thailand
