= Sing Buri =

Coordinates: 14°53′28″N 100°24′11″E

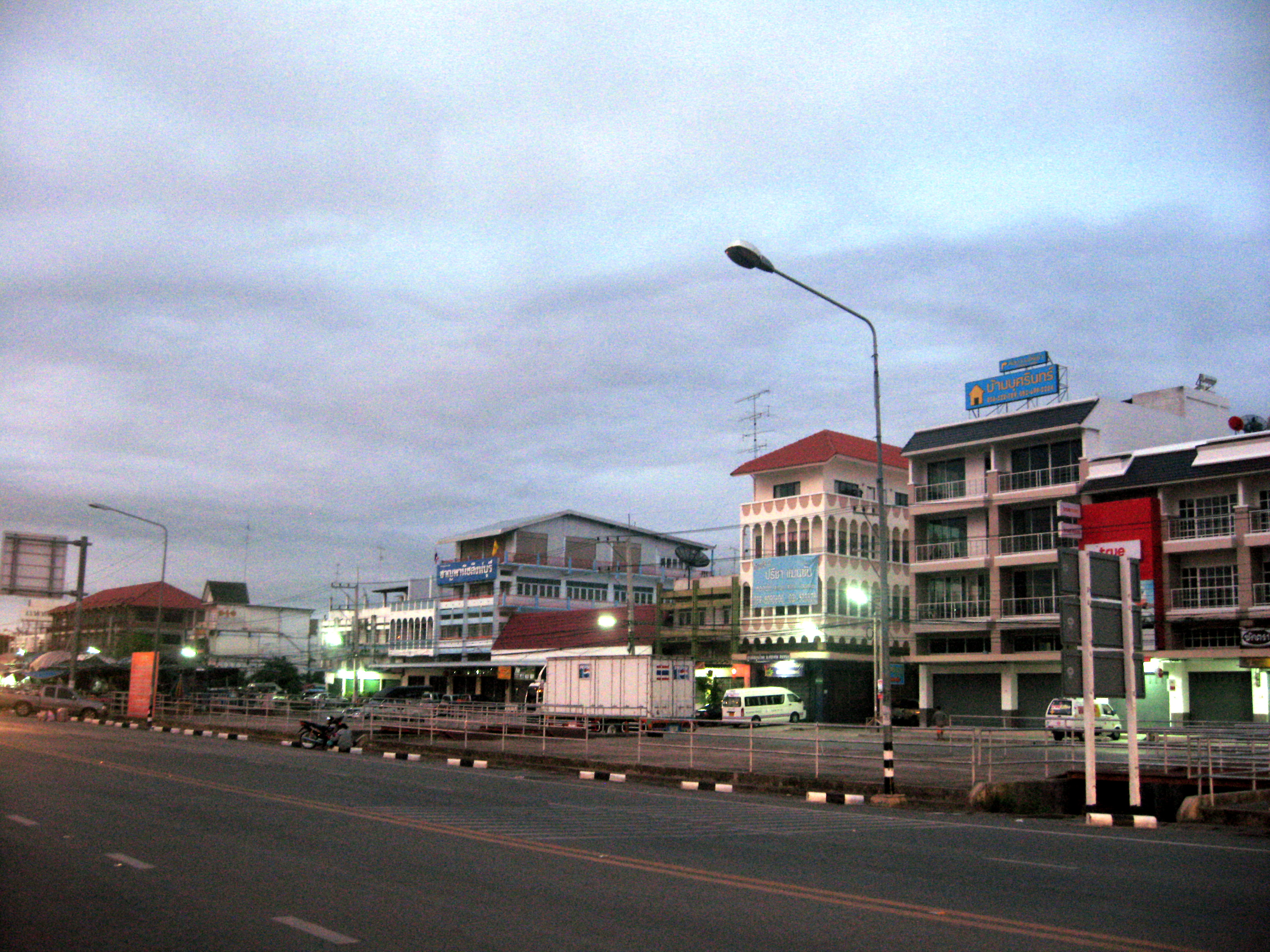
Sing Buri Market

Sing Buri (Thai pronunciation: [sǐŋ būrīː]) is a town (thesaban mueang) in Thailand, capital of the Sing Buri Province. It lies 141 km north of Bangkok. The town covers the whole tambon Bang Phutsa and parts of Bang Man, Muang Mu, Ton Pho, and Bang Krabue, all within Mueang Sing Buri District. As of 2006, it had a population of 19,470.
