= Ngoenyang =

Kingdom of Northern Thai people (638–1292)

Ngoenyang Kingdom ᩉᩥᩁᩢᨬ᩠ᨬᨶᨣᩬᩁᨦᩮᩥ᩠ᨶᨿᩣ᩠ᨦ (Northern Thai) หิรัญญนครเงินยางเชียงเเสน (Thai)
- 638–1292
- Political entities in mainland Southeast Asia in 1180 CE
- Capital: Hiran (c. 638–850); Ngoenyang (c. 850–1262); Chiang Rai (1262–1275); Fang (1275–1286); Wiang Kum Kam (1286–1292)
- Common languages: Northern Thai
- Religion: Theravada Buddhism
- Government: Mandala kingdom
- Monarch
  - c. 638 CE–? (first): Lao Chakkaraj
  - 1123–1166: Chueang
  - 1262–1292 (last): Mangrai the Great
- Historical era: Post-classical era
  - Foundation of Ngoenyang: 638
  - Annexation of Haripunjaya: 1281
  - Foundation of Lanna: 1292
Preceded by	Succeeded by
Wiang Prueksa	Lan Na; Phayao
- Today part of: Thailand; Laos

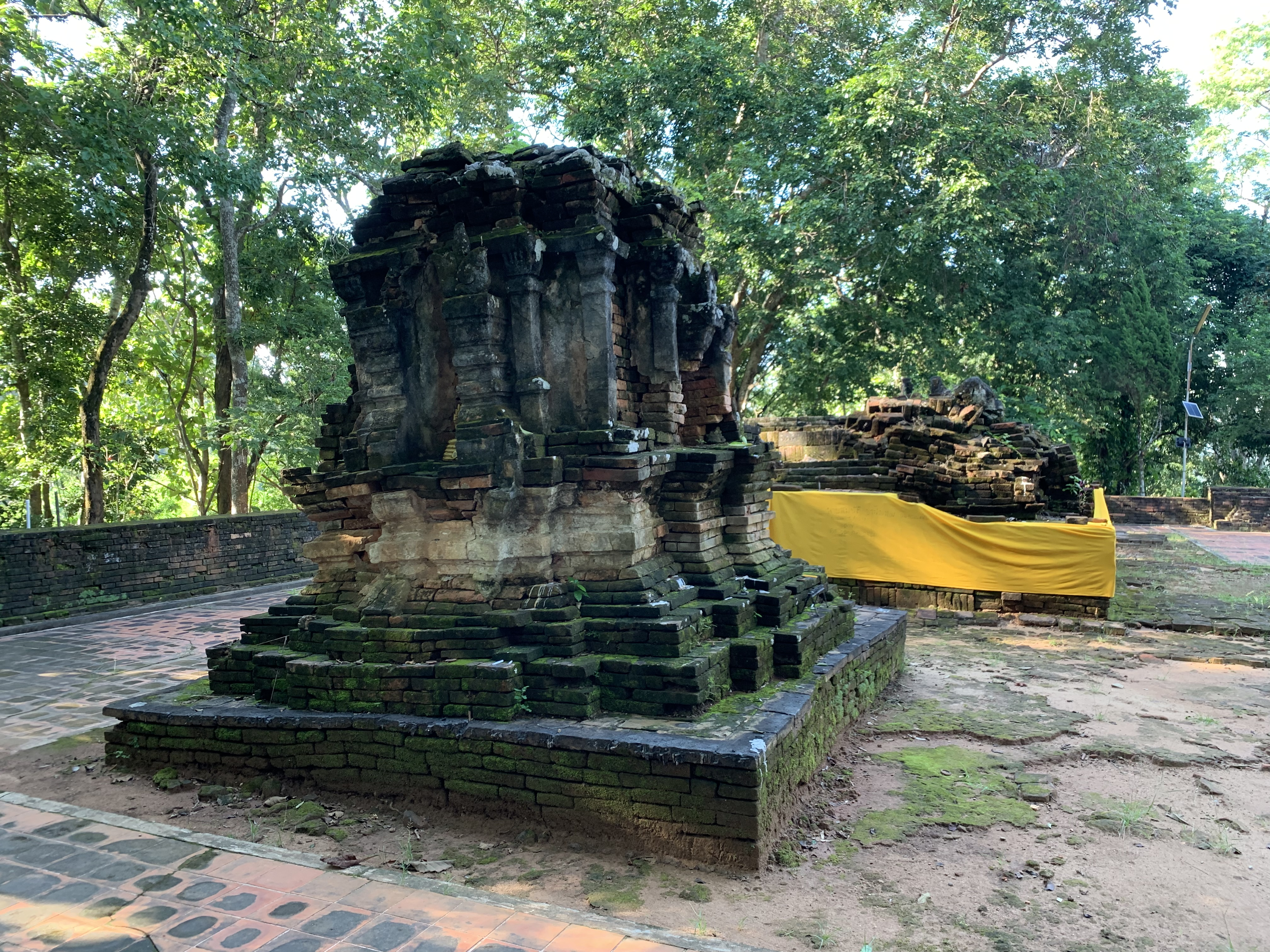
Wat Phra That Doi Pu Khao, built by the Kings of Hiran

Hiran Nakhon Ngoenyang (Northern Thai: ᩉᩥᩁᩢᨬ᩠ᨬᨶᨣᩬᩁᨦᩮᩥ᩠ᨶᨿᩣ᩠ᨦᨩ᩠ᨿᨦᩈᩯ᩠ᨶ; Thai: หิรัญนครเงินยาง), also known as Chayaworanakhon Chiang Lao, Hiranyanakhon Ngoenyang Chiang Saen, Nakhon Yangkapura, or Thasai Ngoenyang was an early mueang or kingdom of the Northern Thai people from the 7th through 13th centuries AD and was originally centered on Hiran, formerly Wiang Prueksa, in modern-day Thailand near today's Mae Sai district in Chiang Rai, and later on Ngoenyang or Chiang Saen. King Mangrai, the 25th king of Ngoenyang, went on to found Lanna.

In contrast to most contemporary Tai states, Ngoenyang was mentioned in local chronicles, which provide some information about its history.

== History ==
Following the decline of Yonok Nakhon Chai Buri Ratchathani Sri Chang Saen, sometime before the late 17th Buddhist century (approximately the 12th century CE), a ruler named Lao Chakkaraj—also known as Lao Chok—rose to power. According to local legend, he was either born miraculously beneath a jujube tree or descended from heaven via silver and golden ladders at Doi Tung. Declaring himself king, Lao Chakkaraj established a new royal line known as the Lao Dynasty, as each subsequent ruler adopted the prefix "Lao" before their name.

=== The Rise of King Mangrai ===
A pivotal transformation occurred in 1262 when Mangrai ascended the throne as the 25th ruler of Ngoenyang Chiang Lao. Visionary and ambitious, he sought to unify the smaller principalities scattered across the northern region. Upon his enthronement, Mangrai founded the city of Chiang Rai, designating it as his new capital. This act marked the end of the Lao Dynasty of Ngoenyang Chiang Lao and the beginning of the Mangrai dynasty, which later became the foundation of the Lan Na Kingdom.

== Location of Ngoenyang ==
The precise location of the ancient city of Ngoenyang remains a topic of scholarly debate. Today, it is generally believed that Ngoenyang corresponds to present-day Chiang Saen, a conclusion drawn primarily from the Chiang Saen Chronicle. The text describes the construction of the city as follows:

"At that time, the king, along with his ministers, constructed a moat 700 wa wide and 1,100 wa long along the river, building fortifications with silver platforms and betel nut trees. They called this city 'Hiran Ngoenyang Chiang Saen.' The silver platform built under the betel nut tree was transformed into a great stupa and monastery, named 'Sangka Kaew Don Than,' also known as 'Wat Sangka Kaew Ngoenyang.' The silver throne was dismantled and offered as a donation. On the 5th day of the waxing moon in the 6th month, at midday, the king entered the royal palace there and was specially titled 'King Lao Chakkarat.'"

However, the Chiang Saen Chronicle—translated into Thai as the Chronicle of Ngoenyang Chiang Saen and the Legend of Singhanavati—is the sole document equating Ngoenyang with Chiang Saen. Other regional chronicles offer different interpretations of the city’s location. The Nan Chronicle places Ngoenyang near Tha Sai, while the Chiang Mai Chronicle situates it near the Sai River. It also recounts how King Mangrai, before founding Chiang Rai, reflected on how Lao Chok built his city at the base of Doi Pha Lao and Lao Khiang later renovated Ngoenyang near the foothills of Doi Tung, Doi Tha, and Doi Ya Thao.

=== Alternative Theories ===
The Phayao Chronicle provides yet another perspective, noting that during the reign of Lao Khiang, the city’s moat was expanded near the Lawaa River. The new settlement was called “Yang Sai,” and the river was renamed “Mae Sai.” This version implies that Ngoenyang was located closer to the Sai River (Thailand) at the base of Doi Tung, not at present-day Chiang Saen:

"King Lao Khiang lamented that no city had a proper wall and moat, deeming it unworthy as a capital. He decided to establish a city where his elephant's tail fell. He ordered the area leveled, elevated the lowlands, and constructed a city with a central sanctuary. The area was named 'Yang Sai,' the cave 'Kiao Cave,' and the Lawaa River was renamed 'Mae Sai,' names that persist to this day."

This account aligns with archaeological research by Worasit Opap, who discovered that “Wiang Phang Kham,” an ancient settlement in Mae Sai district, Chiang Rai province, contained two moated areas—the inner moat having been constructed later to expand the city. Located near Doi Wao, Doi Kha, and Doi Pha Lao, these mountains align geographically with Doi Tung. Opap’s findings suggest that Wiang Phang Kham may indeed correspond to the ancient city of Ngoenyang, rather than Wiang Si Tuang or Wiang Phan Kham as commonly proposed.

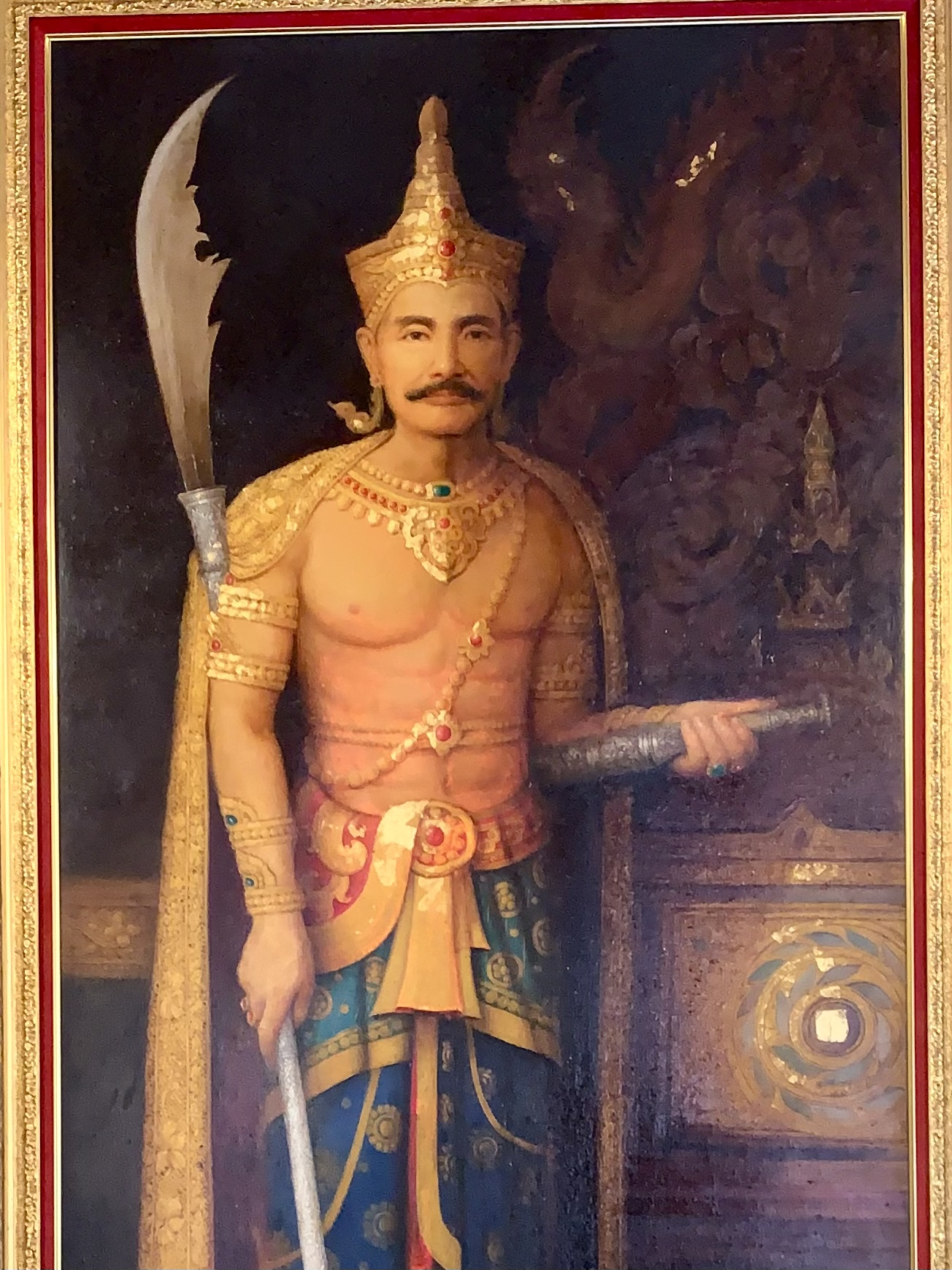
Mural depiction of Lao Chakkaraj (Lao Chong)

== List of rulers ==
1. Lao Chakkaraj or Lao Chok
2. Lao Kao Kaeo Ma Mueang
3. Lao Sao
4. Lao Tang or Lao Phang
5. Lao Klom or Lao Luang
6. Lao Leo
7. Lao Kap
8. Lao Khim or Lao Kin
9. Lao Khiang (expanded the city of Yang Sai)
10. Lao Khiu
11. Lao Ting
12. Lao Toeng
13. Lao Ton
14. Lao Chom
15. Lao Kuak or Lao Phuak
16. Lao Kiu or Lao Kwin
17. Lao Chong (a different person from the first Lao Chakkaraj or Lao Chong)
18. Chom Pha Rueang (had a younger brother named Chom Pha Rueang (or Khun Chom Tham), who founded the city of Phukam Yao (modern-day Phayao), and had a son named Phaya Chueang)
19. Lao Chueang or Phaya Chueang or Khun Chuang (a legendary warrior-king celebrated on both banks of the Mekong River. The Tai Lue, Lao of Lan Xang, and Tai Yuan of Lan Na all claim him as an ancestor. He is featured in extensive literature such as the epic poem Khong Thao Hung Thao Chueang, which spans nearly 5,000 stanzas.)
20. Lao Ngoen Rueang
21. Lao Chuen or Lao Sin
22. Lao Ming
23. Lao Mueang or Lao Moeng
24. Lao Meng
25. Mangrai the Great, 1261–1292 (The first king of Mangrai dynasty in Chiang Mai)
