= Chaiyasiri =

King of Singhanavati at Chai Prakan
- Reign: 438–444
- Predecessor: Phrom
- Successor: City abandoned

King of Kamphaeng Phet
- Reign: 444–457
- Predecessor: City founded
- Successor: Unknown (The region next became known as Duō Miè in the 6th century)
- Born: 390; Wiang Kum Kam
- Died: 457; Kamphaeng Phet
- House: Singhanavati
- Father: Phrom

Chaiyasiri (Thai: ไชยศิริ) was a ruler of the Singhanavati City-State Kingdom in Thailand, prior to the Sukhothai Period.

== Accomplishments ==
According to M. de la Loubere, Chaiyasiri is said to have built the city of Pipeli in Phetchaburi Province.

== Move to Nakhon Thai ==
Chayasiri, along with many of his subjects, moved to Nakhon Thai in Phitsanulok Province, making Nakhon Thai the capital of the Singhanavati Kingdom for a period of time.

Chaiyasiri House of Singhanavati Born: 390 Died: 457
Regnal titles
Preceded by Phrom	King of Singhanavati; 444–457	City abandoned
