= Chueang =

Chueang เจือง
- King of Ngoenyang Kingdom

Kings of Phayao or Fang (Note: The Chronicle of Chiang Saen offers a different perspective, suggesting that the Chueang who ruled Phayao was his elder brother, named Ai Chueang, while he himself—Chueang the Younger—was sent to rule Fang.)
- Reign: 1147 – 1156
- Predecessor: Khun Chomtham
- Successor: Khun Chong

Kings of Ngoenyang
- Reign: 1156 – 1180 (Note: The Chronicle of Chiang Saen offers a different perspective, suggesting that Chueang did not rule Muang Phuan after his military victory but instead appointed his son, who was also named Chueang, as the new ruler.)
- Predecessor: Lao Chuen
- Successor: Lao Ngoen Rueang

Kings of Muang Phuan
- Reign: 1156 – 1180
- Predecessor: Tao Gwa
- Successor: Tao Pha Rueang

Kings of Chiang Hung
- Reign: 1180 – 1192
- Predecessor: Monarch established
- Successor: Tao Sam Khai Noeng
- Born: 1125; Phayao, Thailand
- Died: 1192 (aged 67); Sip Song Chau Tai
- Spouse: Nang Am Paeng Chan Phong; O Kham Paeng Mueang
- Issue: Lao Ngoen Rueang of Ngoenyang; Chueang III of Muang Phuan; Lao Pao of Candrapuri; Khun Kham Roi of Chiang Rai; Chao Soi; Lao Bao (Kham Hao) of Muang Sua; Khun Phaeng of Phayao; Sam Chum Saeng of Nan
- House: Lavachakaraj dynasty
- Father: Chom Pha Rueang
- Mother: Nang Meng
- Religion: Tai folk religion

Chueang (Thai: พญาเจือง, RTGS: Phaya Chueang; Chinese: 叭真), or Phaya Coeng, or Yi Chueang (ยี่เจือง), is the legendary hero of the Tai people who ruled as first king of the Lü Kingdom establishing a capital at Jinghong.

== Biography ==
According to The Chiang Mai Chronicle, Chueang was a son of Chom Pha Rueang, ruler of Ngoenyang, whom he succeeded in 1148 CE. An alternative tradition, however, identifies Chueang as the eldest son of Khun Chomtham, the founding monarch of the Phayao Kingdom and a descendant of Lao Chakkaraj of Ngoenyang. In this account, Chueang ascended the throne of Phayao upon the death of his father in 1148 CE.

The Chronicle of Chiang Saen records that during Chueang's reign—whether centered at Mueang Phayao or Fang—Tao Kwa (ท้าวกวา) of Mueang Kaew Prakan (เมืองแกวประกัน), a polity commonly identified with Xiangkhouang (Muang Phuan), and his younger brother Phraya Chanthaburi (พระยาจันทบุรี) of modern Vientiane, launched a large-scale military invasion of Mueang Ngoenyang in 1150s. At that time, Ngoenyang was ruled by Chueang's uncle, identified in the chronicles as Khun Chin or Khun Chuen (ขุนชิน or ขุนชื่น). Unable to repel the invading forces, Khun Chin sought military assistance from the Chueang brothers. The elder brother Ai Chueang (อ้ายเจือง) died in the battle, while the younger Chueang successfully expelled the invaders and subsequently restored the throne to his uncle and then appointed his own son, Lao Ngoen Rueang, to oversee the polity.

Following this campaign, Chueang led his forces eastward, subjugating several polities before ultimately capturing Mueang Kaew Prakan. He is reported to have ruled from this center until 1180 CE, at which point he transferred authority over Mueang Kaew Prakan to his son, Tao Pha Rueang (ท้าวผาเรือง), and subsequently proceeded to found Chiang Hung as a new political center in the upper Mekong region. In contrast, the Chronicle of Chiang Saen contradicts this account, stating that Chueang never ruled at Mueang Kaew and that authority there was instead entrusted to his middle son, also named Chueang. Meanwhile, the Legend of Chiang Mai claims that Chueang married a daughter of Tao Kwa of Mueang Kaew named Nang U Kaew (นางอู่แก้ว), with whom he had a son named Tao Pha Rueang. Later in his life, he is recorded as having married a princess from a polity in present-day Yunnan.

The aforementioned genealogy differs from that presented in the Chronicle of Chiang Saen, which attributes five sons to Chueang. According to this source, the first three—Lao Ngoen Rueang of Ngoenyang, Chueang of Muang Phuan, and Lao Pao (ลาวพาว) of Vientiane—were born to Nang Am Paeng Chan Phong (นางอามแพงจันทน์ผง), while the remaining two—Khun Kham Roi (ขุนคำร้อย) of Chiang Rai and Chao Soi (เจ้าสร้อย)—were born to O Kham Paeng Mueang (โอคำแพงเมือง). Both consorts are described as daughters of his uncle, Khun Chin. If this genealogy is accepted, the Chueang who married Nang U Kaew, a daughter of the ruler of Muang Phuan, may instead have been his son—also named Chueang—rather than Chueang the father.

Chueang established the polity known as Mueang Ho Kham Chiang Rung (เมืองหอคำเชียงรุ่ง). Contemporary sources further state that following his accession, he conducted a military expedition against Muang Thaeng (present-day Điện Biên Phủ), an action which implies a concurrent or subsequent assault on Chiang Tung, the capital of the Tai Khün (Khoen) kingdom. In Chinese historical sources, Chueang is referred to as Pa Zhen (叭真).

Although the polity founded by Chueang was relatively short-lived, it laid the political and institutional foundations for the Moeng Lü of Sipsong Panna polity, which endured from 1180 until 1950 CE.

== Identity ==
Chueang is an ancestor in the legends and traditions of many ethnic groups and has thus gained a certain historical reality in regional historical thought. Chit Phumisak was one of the first scholars to claim Chueang as a real historical figure. However, it is difficult to ascertain his origins and date his life, as almost all surviving traditions claim great antiquity and try to situate his story in the most distant past available. The following assumptions have been made regarding his identity:

- Chueang is the same person as Phùng Hưng, the leader in rebellion against the Tang dynasty in the 8th century.
- Chueang is the same person as Nong Zhigao, the leader in rebellion against the Lý dynasty and Song dynasty in the 11th century.
- Chueang is the same person as Khun Hung, king of Muang Sua.
- Chueang is a king of Phayao and Ngoenyang in the 11th-12th century.
- Chueang is the first king of Chiang Hung in the early 12th century.

== Wat Thammikaraja ==
Located in front of the Ayutthaya Royal Palace, Wat Thammikaraja was established by Chueang, the son in law of King Sainam Phung before the Ayutthaya Period.

The temple was originally known as Wat Mukkharat, and the name was later changed to honour of the founder. Although once large and grand, today's temple is somewhat diminished. However, there are many important formations inside Wat Thammikaraja.

The focus point of Wat Thammikaraja is a roofless viharn, with ten brick pillars. Inside the temple you will discover a topless chedi surrounded by Angkorian style stucco lions, many which are in good condition, although some of their heads have been chopped off.

There is no charge to enter Wat Thammikaraja.

== Plain of Jars ==
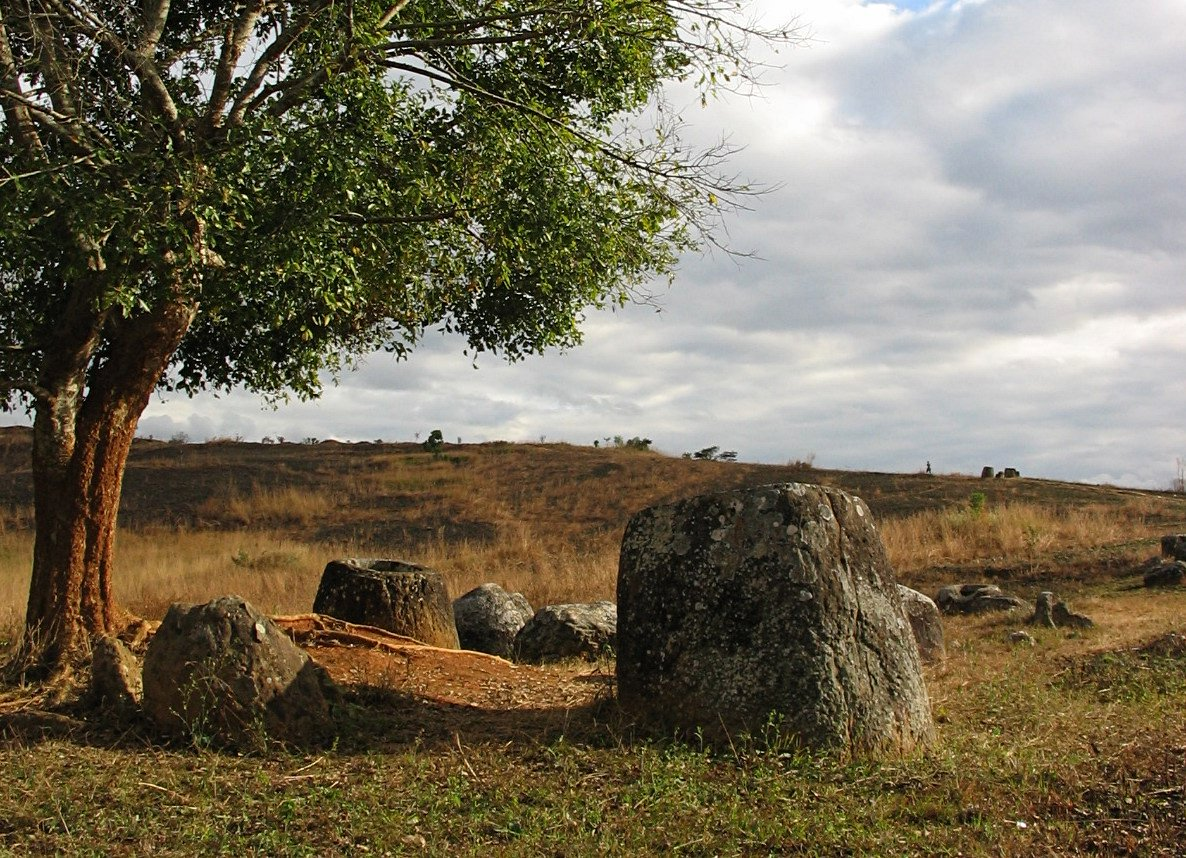
Plain of Jars: Site 1

According to a local legend, the warrior king of Chueang brought his army from Southern China and defeated the evil chieftain, King Anga. The mighty battle was followed by a mighty feast, at which hundreds of gigantic jars of wine were consumed. Chueang was apparently, as bad at tidying up as he was good at throwing parties, for he left behind all of the empty jars, of which nearly three hundred remain, scattered around the flat plains, including his own victory cup. There is little physical evidence to say that this fanciful legend does not hold at least a little truth. Major wars have been fought on the plains over the centuries, as Lao, Siamese and Vietnamese armies attempted to win control of them.

Another local tradition states the jars were molded, using natural materials such as clay, sand, sugar, and animal products in a type of stone mix. This led the locals to believe the cave at Site 1 was actually a kiln, and that the huge jars were fired there and are not actually of stone.

== Death ==
Later on, his enemy sent two of his soldiers to seek help from Khun Lo of the Kingdom of Sip Song Chau Tai. Upon arrival Khun Lo led his army to fight a bloody battle against Chueang and his troops. Chueang was killed on the battlefield in 1192.

== Legacy ==
Chueang had extended his territory far and wide, encompassing Chiang Rung, Chiang Tung, Guangdong, Guangxi, Muang Kaeo, Muang Puan, Muang Sua, Shan and Lavo. As a consequence, these cities rulers claimed Chueang as their ancestor.

Khun Chomtham brought his people and built the city of Phayao in the beginning of 11th century A.D. and enjoyed independence up until the late 13th century A.D. when Phayao had been annexed to Lanna Kingdom.

Phaya Lao Meng married Nang Thep Kham Khai and had one son named Mangrai, who is the first king of Mangrai Dynasty and found Chiang Mai and moved the center of political power and development from Ngoen Yang Chiang Saen to Chiang Mai.

== Modern culture ==
Chueang appears in various versions of the Phra Ruang myth. Phra Ruang, the City Father of Lavo, then a subject of the Khmer king, was obliged to send water-tribute to Angkor. Instead of using normal jars, he devised big baskets to hold a large amount of water. Later Phra Ruang escaped to Sukhothai and ordained as a monk. The Khmer king sent a warrior after him. The Khmer warrior travelled underground and emerged at the temple where Phra Ruang was sweeping the ground. Upon seeing the monk and not knowing Phra Ruang, the Khmer warrior asked where he could find Phra Ruang. Phra Ruang told him to wait for a minute. He then turned the Khmer warrior into stone.

== Descendants ==
- Mangrai the Great, the first King of Lan Na
- Ngammueang, the king of Phayao
- Ram Khamhaeng the Great, the third king of the Phra Ruang dynasty

== See also ==
- Luang Prabang Province
- Muang Sua
- Phayao Province
- Plain of Jars
