= Wiang Phang Kham =

Coordinates: 20°24′46″N 99°53′07″E

Wiang Phang Kham เวียงพางคำ
- Subdistrict
- Interactive map of Wiang Phang Kham
- Country: Thailand
- Province: Chiang Rai
- District: Mae Sai

Population (2012)
  - Total: 20,252
- Time zone: UTC+7 (ICT)

Wiang Phang Kham (Thai: เวียงพางคำ) is a subdistrict (tambon) of Mae Sai District, in Chiang Rai Province, Thailand. In 2012 it had a population of 20,252 people.

== Administration ==
The subdistrict is divided into 10 administrative villages (mubans).

No.	Name	Thai
1.	Ban Mae Sai	บ้านแม่สาย
2.	Ban Doi Ngam	บ้านดอยงาม
3.	Ban Wiang Phan	บ้านเวียงพาน
4.	Ban Pa Yang Mai	บ้านป่ายางใหม่
5.	Ban Pa Mueat	บ้านป่าเหมือด
6.	Ban Pha Mi	บ้านผาหมี
7.	Ban Huai Nam Rin	บ้านห้วยน้ำริน
8.	Ban Pa Mueat Santi Suk	บ้านป่าเหมือดสันติสุข
9.	Ban Pa Mueat Suk Samran	บ้านป่าเหมือดสุขสำราญ
10.	Ban Pa Yang Taek	บ้านป่ายางแตก

The area of the subdistrict is shared by two local governmental units. The subdistrict municipality Mae Sai covers the northeastern part of the subdistrict, parts of the villages one, two, three and ten. The remaining area of the subdistrict is covered by the Wiang Phang Kham Subdistrict Municipality.
