= Doi Tung =

Mountain in Mae Fa Luang' Thailand

- Location within Thailand

Highest point
- Elevation: 1,389 m (4,557 ft)
- Listing: Buddhist temples on mountaintops in Thailand
- Coordinates: 20°20′45″N 99°50′04″E

Naming
- Native name: ดอยตุง (Thai)

Geography
- Location: Chiang Rai (Thailand)
- Parent range: Doi Nang Non, Daen Lao Range

Geology
- Mountain type: granite

Climbing
- Easiest route: drive

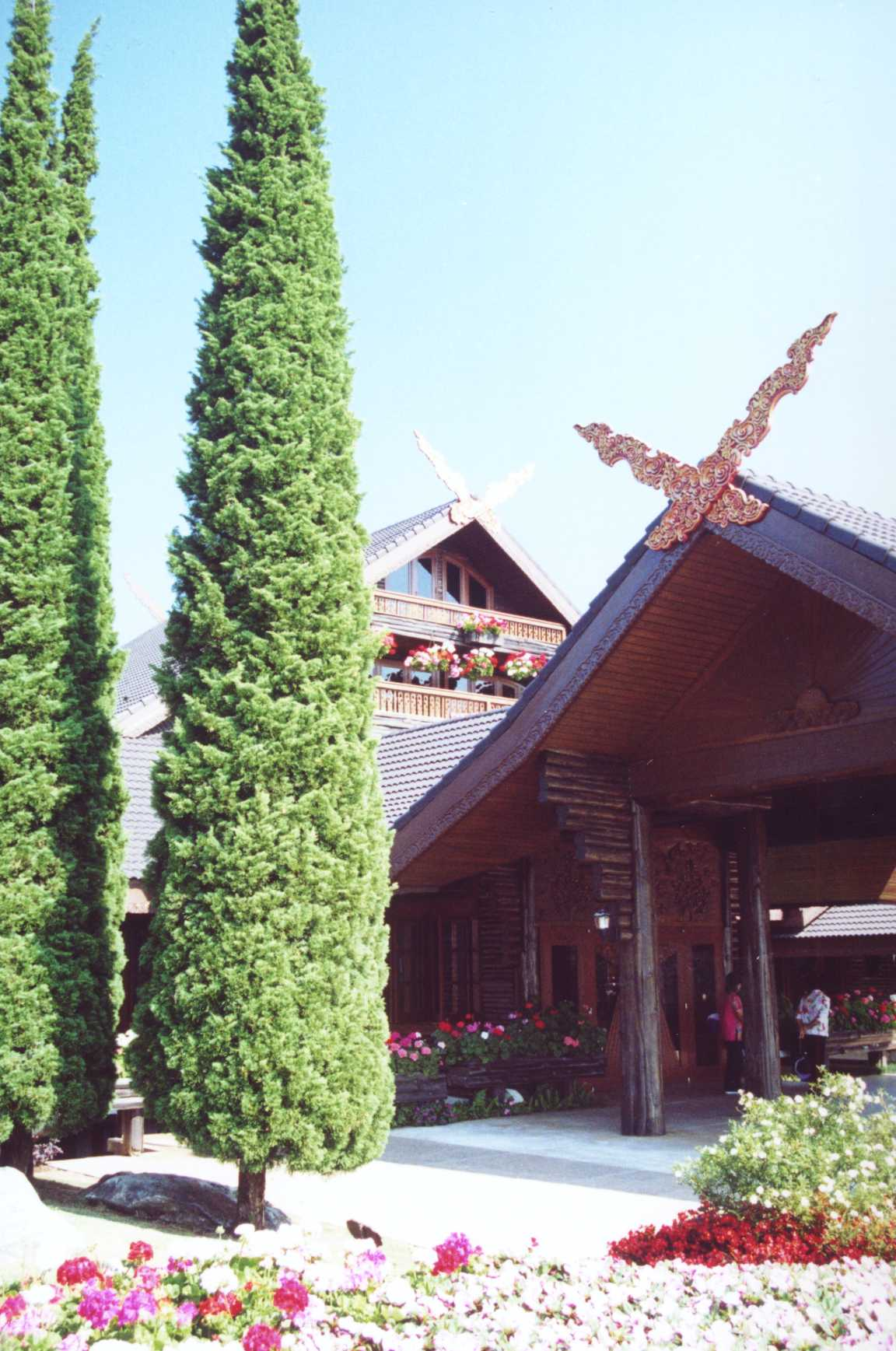
Doi Tung Royal Villa

Doi Tung (ดอยตุง) is a mountain in the Thai highlands of Mae Fa Luang District, Chiang Rai Province, Thailand.

== Location ==
While not the highest elevation of the province, the 1,389 m high Doi Tung rises steeply close to the Thailand-Myanmar border. It is the highest point of the Doi Nang Non, a subrange of the Daen Lao Range, in the area known as "Golden Triangle".

== Description ==
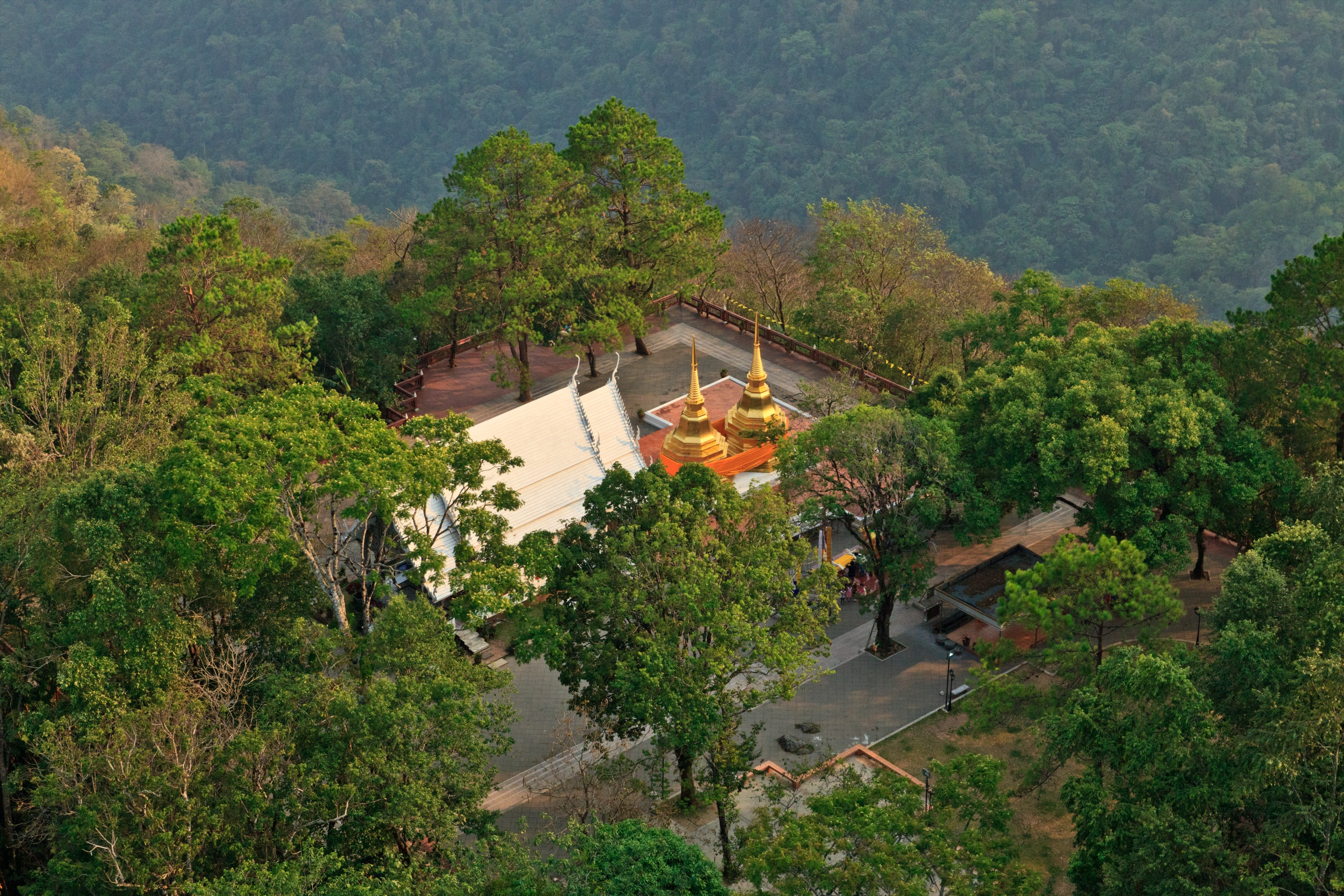
Wat Phra That Doi Tung

Most of the bedrock of the mountain is limestone and granite. The vegetation below 1,000 m is mostly deciduous forest, and the vegetation above this height is evergreen.

The population of Doi Tung is about 11,000 people, consisting of various tribes including Akha, Lahu, Tai Lue, and Lawa.

Wat Phra That Doi Tung is on top of the hill. According to the chronicles, this Buddhist place of worship dates back to the year 911. It is an important pilgrimage spot for the devout.

== Economy ==
Coffee plantations cover an area of 15 km^{2}. There are 3.5 million coffee trees on Doi Tung. Almost half of Doi Tung's population is in coffee farming, providing a stable source of income for nearly 900 families.

The Doi Tung Development Project is focused on the area of Doi Tung and has infused life into a previously moribund economy. Per capita incomes in the area have increased sixfold from 1988 to 2016.

== Doi Tung Royal Villa ==
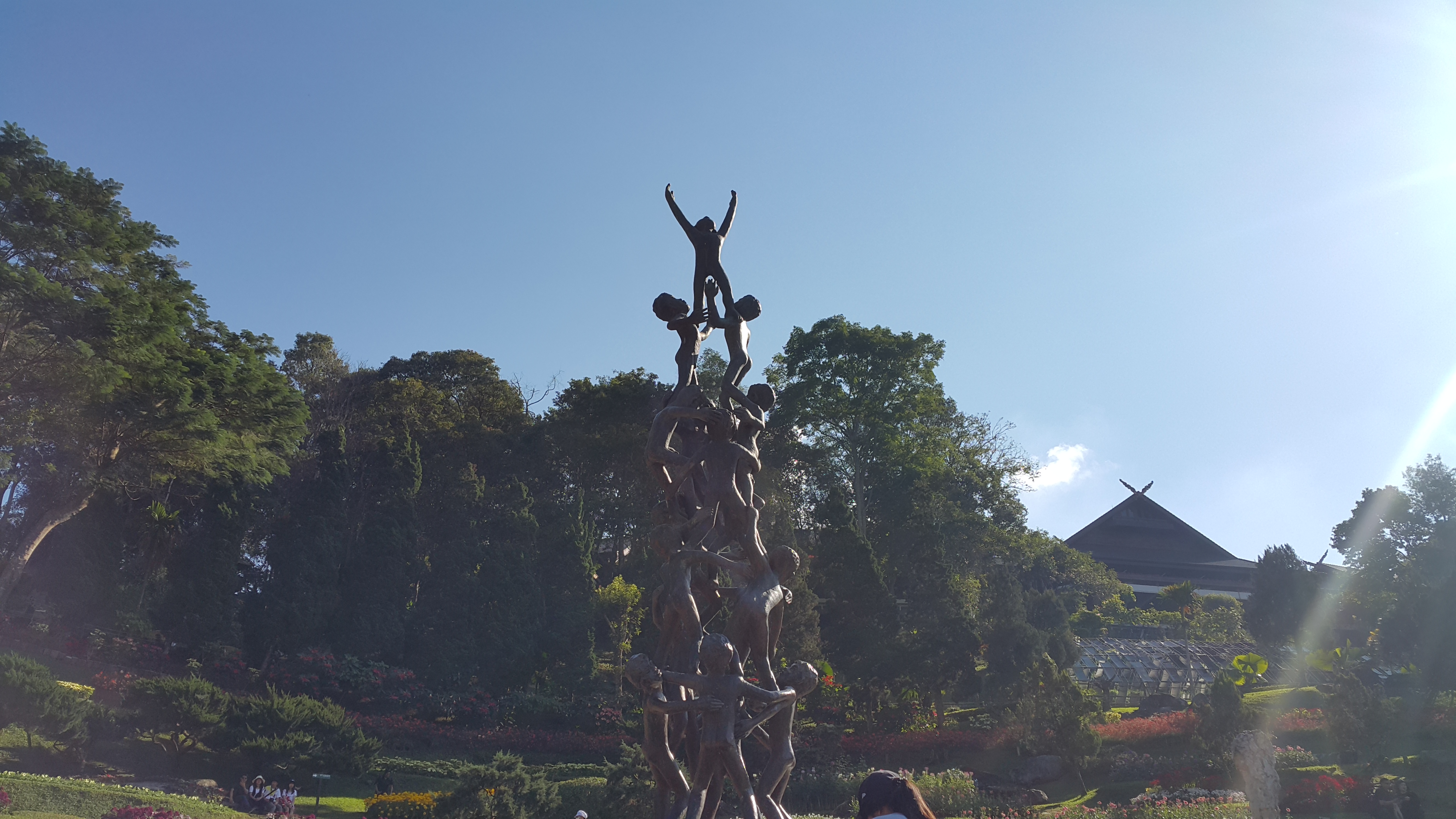
Sculpture, Doi Tung Royal Villa

Doi Tung Royal Villa, former residence of Princess Mother Srinagarindra, is high up on the hill. The villa was originally built as a summer residence for the princess mother and now houses a museum displaying her work to improve the life quality of local tribes people. The Mae Fah Luang Gardens are a botanical park on the slopes below the royal villa. Flowers and plants grow among rock formations.

Due to the princess mother's interest and encouragement, the hills were reforested. She was also instrumental in fighting against the opium trade. As a result, the local hill tribes stopped growing poppies and began to grow other crops.

== See also ==
- Doi Nang Non
- List of mountains in Thailand
