= Chula Sakarat =

Historic lunisolar calendar

Chula Sakarat or Chulasakarat (Pali: Culāsakaraj; Burmese: ကောဇာသက္ကရာဇ်, pronounced [kɔ́zà θɛʔkəɹɪʔ]; Khmer: ចុល្លសករាជ, ALA-LC: Cullasakarāj; Thai: จุลศักราช, RTGS: Chunlasakkarat, pronounced [t͡ɕūn.lā.sàk.kā.ràːt], abbrv. จ.ศ. Choso) is a lunisolar calendar derived from the Burmese calendar, whose variants were in use by most mainland Southeast Asian kingdoms down to the late 19th century. The calendar is largely based on an older version of the Hindu calendar though unlike the Indian systems, it employs a version of the Metonic cycle. The calendar therefore has to reconcile the sidereal years of the Hindu calendar with Metonic cycle's tropical years by adding intercalary months and intercalary days on irregular intervals.

Although the name Culāsakaraj is a generic term meaning "Lesser Era" in Pali, the term Chula Sakarat is often associated with the various versions of the calendar used in regions that make up modern-day Thailand, Laos, Cambodia, Myanmar and the Sipsong Panna area of China. In Thailand, it is only used in academia for Thai history studies.

== Etymology ==
The name Chula Sakarat is derived from Pali culā "small" and Sanskrit śaka + rāja, literally meaning "Scythian king" (the meaning was thought and held to be "era" by some of those having adopted the Indianised culture in Indochina, including the Thais).

In Thailand, this era is used in contrast with the Shalivahana era, commonly known in Southeast Asia as Mahāsakaraj or the Great or Major Era (Burmese: မဟာ သက္ကရာဇ်, [məhà θɛʔkəɹɪʔ]; Khmer: មហាសករាជ, ALA-LC: Mahāsakarāj; Thai: มหาศักราช; RTGS: Mahasakkarat).

== History ==
The calendar was launched in 640 CE in Sri Ksetra Kingdom (in modern Myanmar) with the epochal year 0 date of 22 March 638. It was largely a recalibration of then prevailing Mahasakaraj or Saka Era. It was later adopted by the Pagan Kingdom. According to the Chiang Mai Chronicles and the Chiang Saen Chronicles, Chiang Mai, Chiang Saen and their tributary states of middle and upper Tai country (except Lamphun and Sukhothai) submitted to King Anawrahta and adopted the calendar in the mid-11th century in place of Mahasakaraj, the standard calendar of the Khmer Empire. However, scholarship says the earliest evidence of Burmese calendar in modern Thailand dates only to mid-13th century.

The use of the calendar appears to have spread southward to the Sukhothai, Ayutthaya, and eastward to Laotian states in the following centuries. The official adoption farther south by the Ayutthaya Kingdom and farther east by Lan Xang came only after King Bayinnaung's conquests of those kingdoms in the 16th century. Subsequent Siamese kingdoms retained the Burmese calendar as the official calendar under the name of Chula Sakarat (Culasakaraj) until 1889.

The calendar fell out of use throughout the region in the second half of the 19th century with the advent of European colonialism. The only remaining independent state Siam too dropped the calendar on 1 April 1889 per King Chulalongkorn (Rama V)'s decree. It was replaced by Rattanakosin Era. Today, the calendar is used purely for cultural and religious festivals in Myanmar. Thailand has moved on to its own version of Buddhist calendar since 1941 although the Chula Sakarat era dates remain the most commonly used and preferred form of entry by the academia for Thai history studies.

== Differences ==
=== Nomenclature ===
==== Month numbering ====
Various regional versions of Chula Sakarat/Burmese calendar existed across various regions of mainland Southeast Asia. Unlike Burmese systems, Sipsong Panna, Kengtung, Lan Na, Lan Xang and Sukhothai systems refer to the months by numbers, not by names. This means reading ancient texts and inscriptions in Thailand requires constant vigilance, not just in making sure one is correctly operating for the correct region, but also for variations within regions itself when incursions cause a variation in practice. However, Cambodian (Khmer) month system, which begins with Margasirsa as the first month, demonstrated precisely by the names and numbers.

| Month | Khmer, Lan Xang, Sukhothai | Kengtung, Sipsong Panna | Chiang Mai |
|---|---|---|---|
| Caitra | 5 | 6 | 7 |
| Vaisakha | 6 | 7 | 8 |
| Jyestha | 7 | 8 | 9 |
| Ashadha | 8 | 9 | 10 |
| Sravana | 9 | 10 | 11 |
| Bhadrapada | 10 | 11 | 12 |
| Asvina | 11 | 12 | 1 |
| Karttika | 12 | 1 | 2 |
| Margasirsha | 1 | 2 | 3 |
| Pausha | 2 | 3 | 4 |
| Magha | 3 | 4 | 5 |
| Phalguna | 4 | 5 | 6 |

Note: The Sukhothai and Lan Xang numbering systems and the now abandoned Burmese numbering system are the same.

==== Animal names ====
Cambodian and Thai systems give animal names to the years from a cycle of 12. The practice also existed in Burma but had died out by the 17th century. In March 1638, King Thalun of Burma rejected the proposal by King Prasat Thong of Siam to change the animal names of the calendar months because the animal naming system was no longer in use in Burma.

| Year | Animal | Khmer |
|---|---|---|
| 1 | Rat | ជូត (Choot) |
| 2 | Ox | ឆ្លូវ (Chhlov) |
| 3 | Tiger | ខាល (Khal) |
| 4 | Hare | ថោះ (Thos) |
| 5 | Naga/Dragon | រោង (Rorng) |
| 6 | Snake | ម្សាញ់ (M'sanh) |
| 7 | Horse | មមី (Momee) |
| 8 | Goat | មមែ (Momèr) |
| 9 | Monkey | វក (Vork) |
| 10 | Cock | រកា (Roka) |
| 11 | Dog | ច (Char) |
| 12 | Pig | កុរ (Kol) |

=== Calculation methodology ===
Chula Sakarat, like the Burmese calendar, was largely based on the Hindu calendar, an older version of Surya Siddhanta. However, unlike Hindu calendar, it also uses a 19-year Metonic cycle. In order to reconcile the sidereal months of Hindu calendar with Metonic cycle's solar years, the calendar inserts intercalary months and days on some schedule.

==== Intercalation ====
The Siamese system uses three similar but not identical types of lunar years used by the Burmese system. Each calendar has the same regular year of 354 days and a leap year of 384 days. However, whereas the Burmese calendar adds the intercalary day only in a leap cycle according to its Metonic cycle, the Siamese calendar adds the intercalary day to a regular year. The Siamese calendar does add the extra day in the same place (Jyestha/Nayon), however.

| Calendar | Regular | Small leap year | Big leap year |
|---|---|---|---|
| Burmese | 354 | 384 | 385 |
| Chula Sakarat | 354 | 355 | 384 |

==== Length of the year ====
Down to the mid-19th century, the Burmese calendar and its Siamese cousin both used the Surya method. But between 1840 and 1853, Konbaung Dynasty switched to what it believed was a more accurate method called Thandeikta (a hybrid of the old Surya and an updated version of Surya from India). Thandeikta introduced a slightly longer solar year (0.56 second a year longer than the old system) and a slightly longer lunar month that produces a smaller gap between the two. However, it has turned out that the new system is actually slightly less accurate (0.56 second a year) than the old system in terms of the drift from the scientifically measured tropical year. At any rate, the old and the new systems are 23 minutes 50.8704 seconds and 23 minutes 51.4304 seconds respectively ahead of the actual tropical year. The error continues to mount.

==== Metonic cycle ====
Since the Thandeikta system not only does not solve but actually increases the accumulating drift issue, Burmese calendarists have resorted to periodically modifying the intercalation schedule of the Metonic cycle, starting in 1839 CE, using apparent reckoning. The fixed Metonic cycle remained in place in Siam.

== See also ==
- Buddhist calendar
- Burmese calendar
- Saka Era
- Thai lunar calendar

== Bibliography ==
- Aung-Thwin, Michael (2005). The mists of Rāmañña: The Legend that was Lower Burma (illustrated ed.). Honolulu: University of Hawai'i Press. ISBN 9780824828868.
- Busyakul, Visudh (2004). "Calendar and Era in use in Thailand" (PDF). Journal of the Royal Institute of Thailand (in Thai). 29 (2, April–June). Bangkok: Royal Institute of Thailand: 468–78. Archived from the original (PDF) on 2014-01-16.
- Eade, J.C. (1989). Southeast Asian Ephemeris: Solar and Planetary Positions, A.D. 638–2000. Ithaca: Cornell University. ISBN 0-87727-704-4.
- Eade, J.C. (1995). The Calendrical Systems of Mainland South-East Asia (illustrated ed.). Brill. ISBN 9789004104372.
- Irwin, Sir Alfred Macdonald Bulteel (1909). The Burmese and Arakanese calendars. Rangoon: Hanthawaddy Printing Works.
- Luce, G.H. (1970). Old Burma: Early Pagan. Vol. 2. Locust Valley, NY: Artibus Asiae and New York University.
- Ohashi, Yukio (2001). Alan K. L. Chan; Gregory K. Clancey; Hui-Chieh Loy (eds.). Historical Perspectives on East Asian Science, Technology, and Medicine (illustrated ed.). World Scientific. ISBN 9789971692599.
- Oriental Institute; East India Association (1900). The Imperial and Asiatic Quarterly Review and Oriental and Colonial Record. London and Working, England: Oriental Institute.
- Smith, Ronald Bishop (1966). Siam; Or, the History of the Thais: From 1569 A.D. to 1824 A.D. Vol. 2. Decatur Press.
- Rong, Syamananda (1986). A History of Thailand (5 ed.). Chulalongkorn University.
