= Wiang subdistrict, Chiang Saen =

Coordinates: 20°18′48″N 100°04′10″E

Wiang ตำบลเวียง อำเภอเชียงแสน
- Tambon
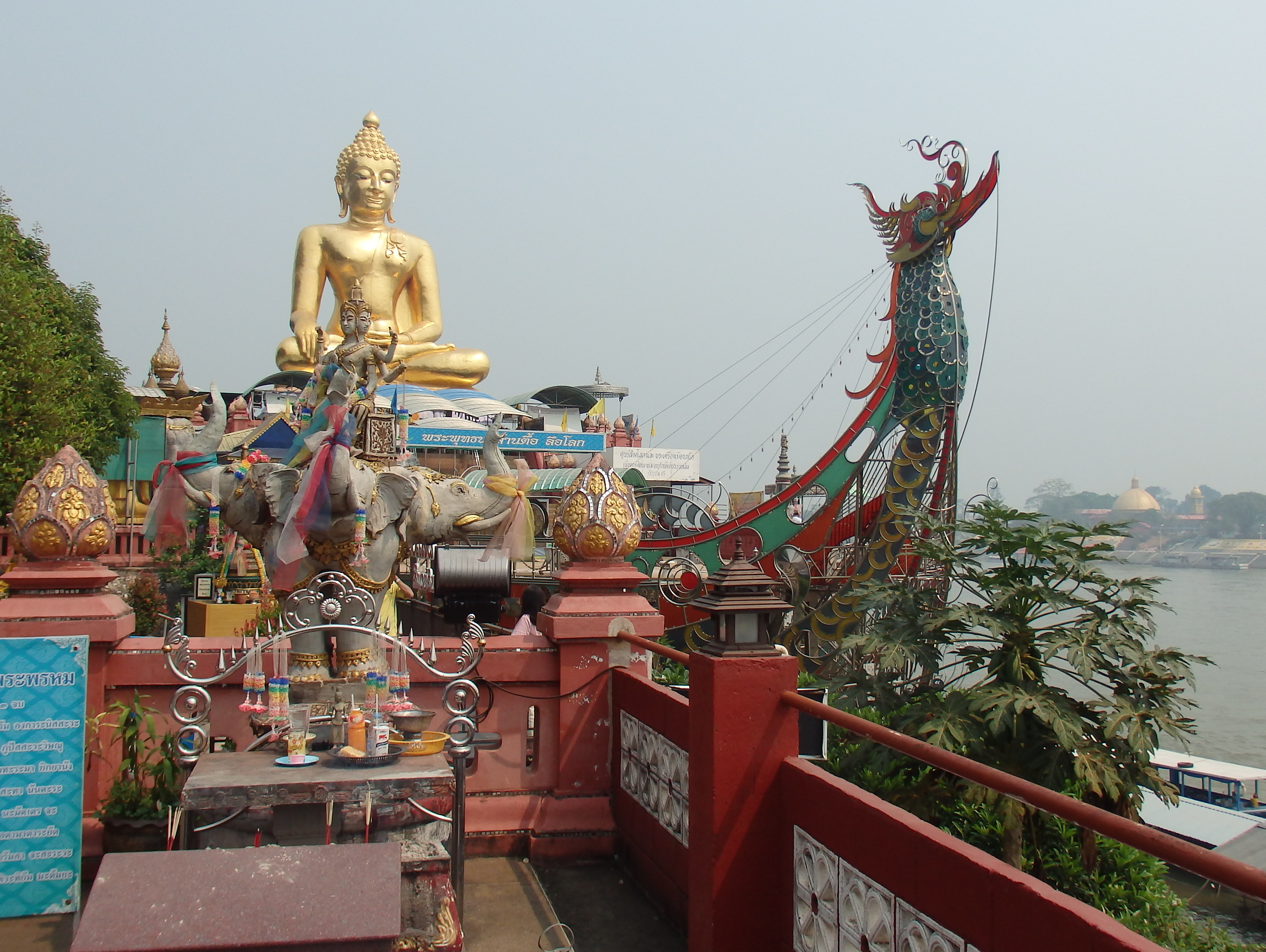
- Buddha statue at Ban Sop Ruak, Wiang, marking the "heart" of the Golden Triangle
- Interactive map of Wiang
- Country: Thailand
- Province: Chiang Rai
- District: Chiang Saen

Population (2005)
  - Total: 10,807
- Time zone: UTC+7 (ICT)

Wiang (Thai: ตำบลเวียง อำเภอเชียงแสน) is a village and tambon (subdistrict) of Chiang Saen District, in Chiang Rai Province, Thailand. In 2005 it had a population of 10,807 people. The tambon contains 10 villages.

The Golden Triangle tri-point of Myanmar, Laos, and Thailand is found in the village of Ban Sop Ruak in the subdistrict.
