= Chiang Saen (disambiguation) =

Chiang Saen is a capital of the ancient Lanna kingdom, and namesake of the modern district.

Chiang Saen may also refer to:

- Chiang Saen district, in Chiang Rai Province, northern Thailand
- Chiang Saen Lake, a natural freshwater lake in Chiang Saen district, Thailand
- Chiang Saen languages, a subgroup of the Southwestern Tai languages
