= Pa Sak, Chiang Rai =

Pa Sak ป่าสัก
- Tambon
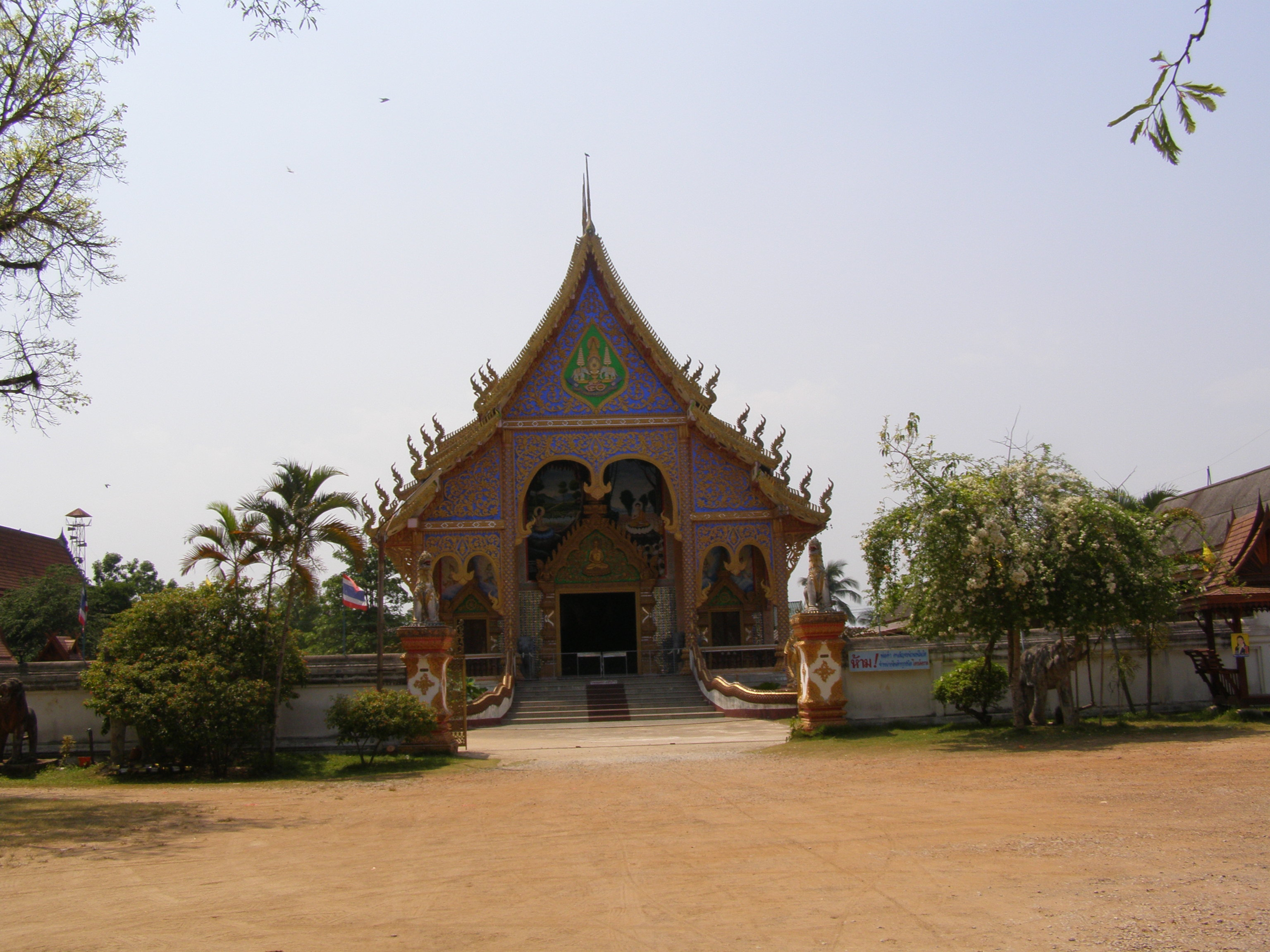
- Wat Ban Pang Mo Puang
- Interactive map of Pa Sak
- Coordinates: 20°16′35″N 99°59′28″E
- Country: Thailand
- Province: Chiang Rai
- Amphoe: Chiang Saen

Population (2019)
  - Total: 7,877
- Time zone: UTC+7 (TST)
- Postal code: 57150
- TIS 1099: 570802

Pa Sak (Thai: ป่าสัก) is a tambon (subdistrict) of Chiang Saen District, in Chiang Rai Province, Thailand. In 2019 it had a total population of 7,877 people.

== History ==
The subdistrict was created effective September 15, 1979 by splitting off 9 administrative villages from Si Don Mun.

== Administration ==
=== Central administration ===
The tambon is subdivided into 13 administrative villages (muban).

No.	Name	Thai
1.	Ban Mae Kham Kaset	บ้านแม่คำเกษตร
2.	Ban Mae Kham Nong Bua	บ้านแม่คำหนองบัว
3.	Ban Pa Sak Noi	บ้านป่าสักน้อย
4.	Ban Pa Daet	บ้านป่าแดด
5.	Ban Nong Bua Sot	บ้านหนองบัวสด
6.	Ban Pang Mo Puang	บ้านปางหมอปวง
7.	Ban Doi Champi	บ้านดอยจำปี
8.	Ban Doi Si Kaeo	บ้านดอยศรีแก้ว
9.	Ban San Makhet	บ้านสันมะเค็ด
10.	Ban Doi Kham	บ้านดอยคำ
11.	Ban Mae Kham Tai	บ้านแม่คำใต้
12.	Ban Pa Sak Noi	บ้านป่าสักน้อย
13.	Ban Pa Sak Noi	บ้านป่าสักน้อย

=== Local administration ===
The whole area of the subdistrict is covered by the subdistrict administrative organization (SAO) Pa Sak (องค์การบริหารส่วนตำบลป่าสัก).

== Landmarks ==
The historical site of Wat Pa Sak is located in this region.
