= Chiang Saen Lake =

Lake in Thailand

- Location: Chiang Saen District, Chiang Rai Province, Thailand
- Coordinates: 20.26061°N 100.04606°E
- Surface area: 4.342 km^{2} (1.676 sq mi)

Nong Bong Kai Non-hunting Area
- Chiang Saen Lake
- IUCN category III (natural monument or feature)
- Interactive map of Nong Bong Kai Non-hunting Area
- Location: Chiang Saen District, Chiang Rai Province, Thailand
- Nearest city: Chiang Rai
- Coordinates: 20°15′38.2″N 100°02′45.8″E
- Area: 22.9914 km^{2} (8.8770 sq mi)
- Established: 4 April 1985 Ramsar Site 5 July 2001
- Governing body: Royal Forestry Department

Ramsar Wetland
- Official name: Nong Bong Kai Non-hunting Area
- Designated: 5 July 2001
- Reference no.: 1100

Chiang Saen Lake (Thai: ทะเลสาบเชียงแสน) is a natural freshwater lake in Thailand, it is located in Yonok Subdistrict, Chiang Saen District, Chiang Rai Province, northern Thailand.

According to the folklore, the legend of Singhanavati (ตำนานสิงหนวัติ), it used to be an ancient kingdom known as Singhanavati or Yonok. The kingdom was destroyed by a sudden flood from earthquake in 545. The town was submerged and is known today as "Wiang Nong Lom" (เวียงหนองหล่ม, lit. 'drowned town') an archaeological swamp south of the lake.

The lake has a total area of 2,711 rais (1,071 acres, 4.342 km2). It was originally just a small swamp, until a dam was built to block the waterway overflow until a large lake was formed known as Nong Bong Kai (หนองบงคาย). In 1985 it was declared as Nong Bong Kai Non-hunting Area.

The lake is home to large flocks of migratory waterfowls from November through February. Bird species found here are lesser whistling duck, grebe, common pochard, watercock. There is a campsite for visitors. Chiang Saen Lake is the northernmost lake in Thailand.

== See also ==
- List of protected areas of Thailand
- List of Ramsar wetlands of Thailand
