= Ban Saeo =

Coordinates: 20°12′57″N 100°13′30″E

Ban Saeo บ้านแซว
- Tambon
- Interactive map of Ban Saeo
- Country: Thailand
- Province: Chiang Rai
- District: Chiang Saen

Population (2005)
  - Total: 11,444
- Time zone: UTC+7 (ICT)

Ban Saeo (Thai: บ้านแซว) is a village and tambon (subdistrict) of Chiang Saen District, in Chiang Rai Province, Thailand. In 2005, it had a population of 11,444 people. The tambon contains 15 villages.
