= Wat Pa Sak =

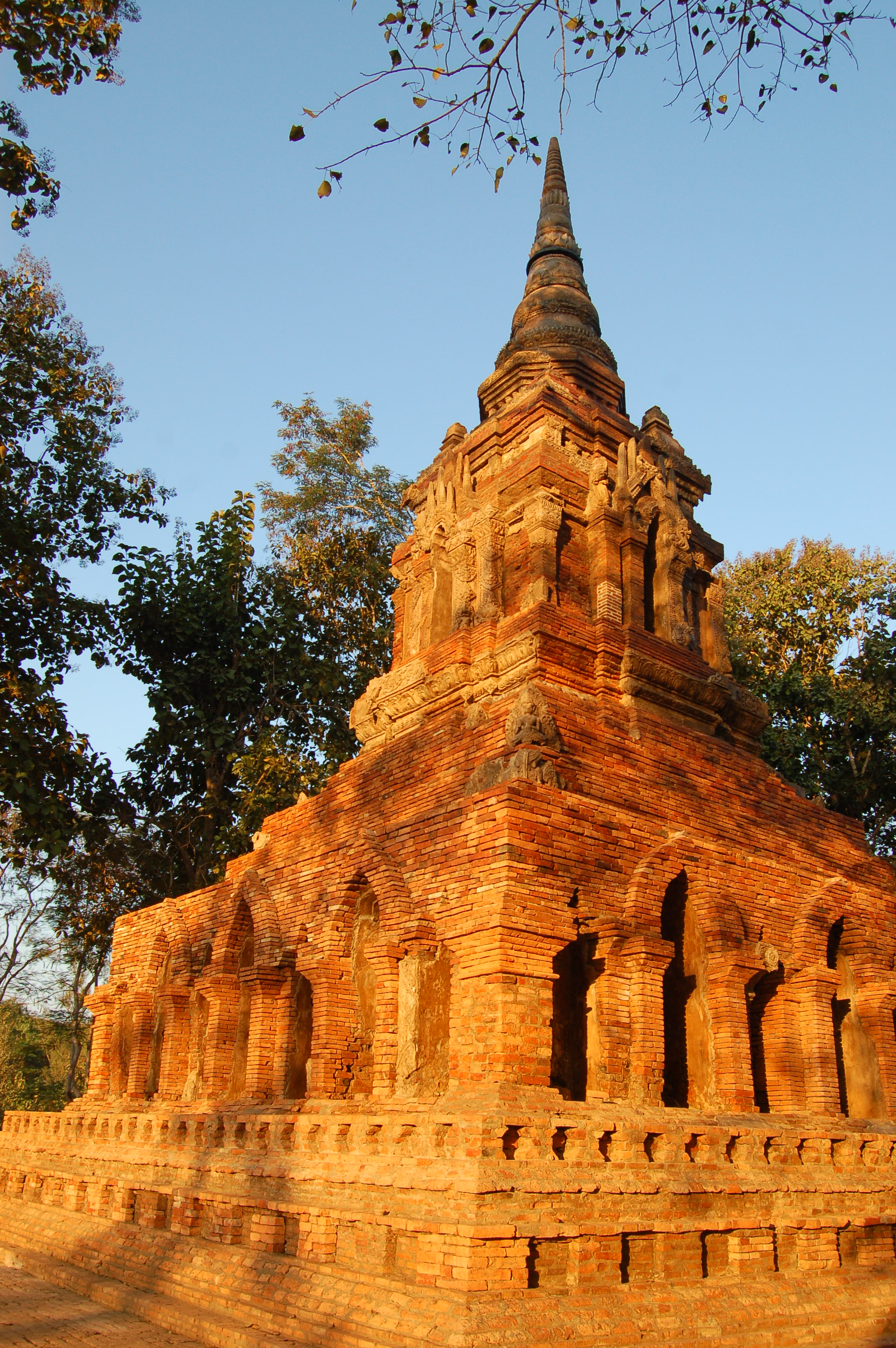

- Location within Thailand

Religion
- Affiliation: Theravada Buddhism

Location
- Location: Chiang Saen District, Chiang Rai Province
- Country: Thailand
- Interactive map of Wat Pa Sak
- Coordinates: 20°16′27″N 100°4′39″E

Architecture
- Founder: Saen Phu
- Completed: 1340s

Wat Pa Sak (Thai: วัดป่าสัก, "Temple of the Teak Forest") is a wat (Buddhist temple-monastery) in Chiang Saen District, Chiang Rai Province, Thailand. Located just outside the city's old walls, the temple derives its name from the 300 teaks planted on the site around the time of its foundation. Wat Pa Sak's origins date back to the 13th or 14th centuries.

== History ==
The exact date of Wat Pa Sak's founding is unclear. Possible dates range from 1295 to the 1340s.

The establishment of the temple coincided with the development of Chiang Saen as a main centre of the mueang of Lan Na by King Saen Phu, who ruled from 1325 to 1334. Chiang Saen was named after Saen Phu.

The temple has undergone numerous restorations over the centuries, including significant enhancements by later Lan Na rulers in the 15th century. These restorations have made pinpointing an original founding date more difficult.

== Architecture ==
Wat Sa Pak is a prime example of the Early Classic Lan Na style but also incorporates a number of other styles including Sukhothai, Hariphunchai and Bagan.

The best preserved part of the temple complex is its elaborate stupa 12.5 metres (41 ft) tall and featuring many ornamental stucco motifs.

Particularly significant are the stucco images of Gautama Buddha, which are among the few remaining in situ examples from the Early Classic period. These images also have aureole and halo features, often found in this and earlier periods, but absent after the 14th century. Some of the images are "walking Buddha" or "standing Buddha" images, indicative of Sukhothai influence.

Also featured at Wat Pa Sak are numerous mythical creature stucco images. Dwarf creatures are featured on temple tiers serving as guardian figures. Examples of makara and singh (mythical lion) figures are also found here. Garuda figures associated with Hinduism and the Sukhothai Kingdom also adorn Wat Pa Sak's walls.

== Mythology ==
Like most stupas, the Wat Pa Sak stupa symbolizes the mythic Mount Meru of Buddhist and Hindu cosmology. The Himavat Forest on the lower slopes of Meru is the domain of many mythical creatures, some of whom were chosen to guard sacred structures.
