= Ruak River =

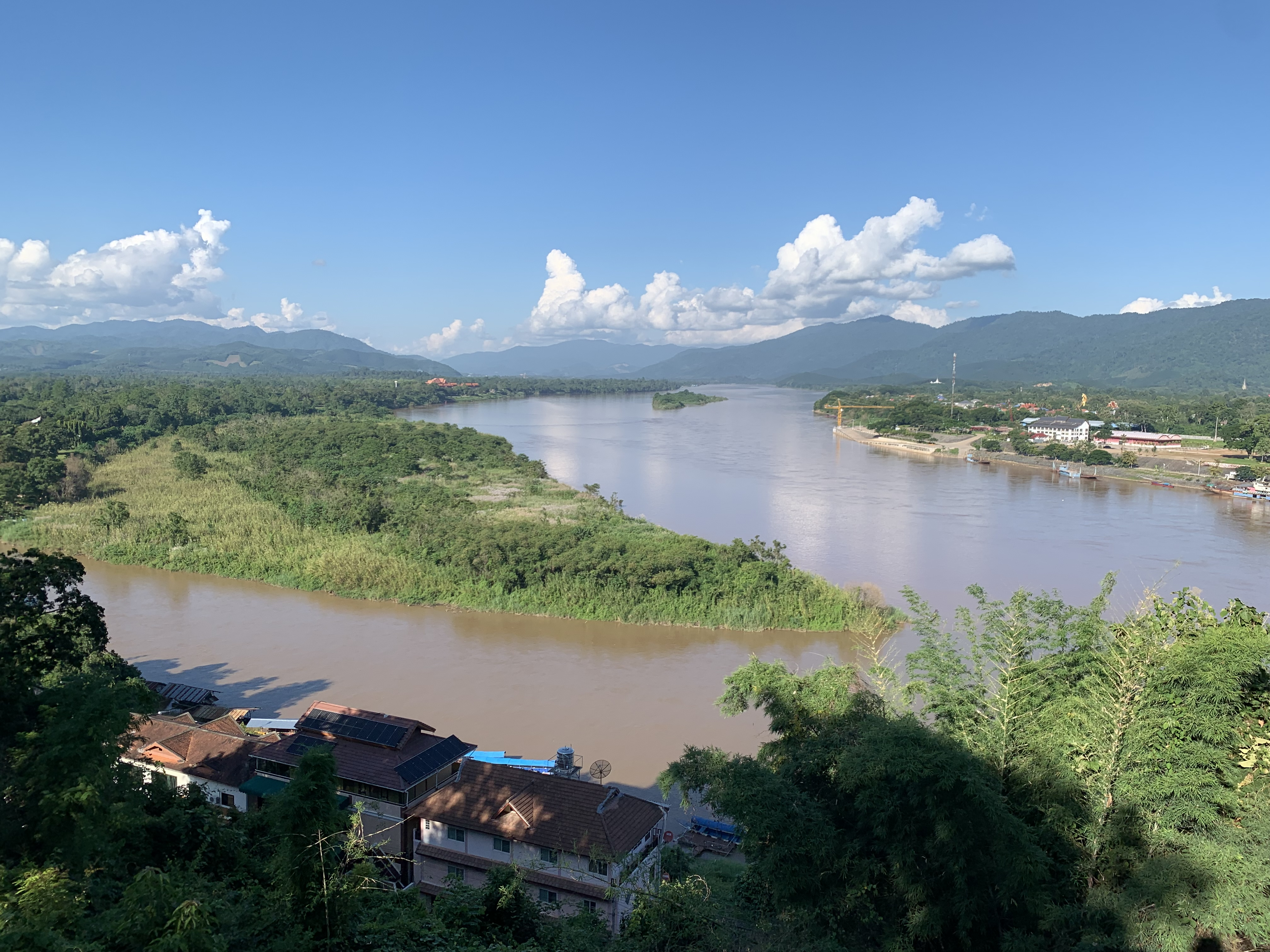
- Confluence of Ruak River with Mekong River, view from Wat Phra That Doi Pu Khao in Ban Sop Ruak
- Native name: แม่น้ำรวก (Thai)

Location
- Country: Myanmar and Thailand

Physical characteristics
- Source
  - location: Daen Lao Range, Shan Hills
- Mouth
  - location: Mekong at Ban Sop Ruak, Chiang Saen District
  - coordinates: 20°21′16″N 100°4′57″E
  - elevation: 366 m (1,201 ft)

Basin features
- Tributaries
  - right: Mae Sai River

The Ruak River (Thai: แม่น้ำรวก, RTGS: Maenam Ruak, pronounced [mɛ̂ː.náːm rûak]; Northern Thai: น้ำแม่ฮวก, pronounced [nâːm mɛ̂ː hûak]) is a right hand tributary of the Mekong. The mouth of the Ruak river is at the Thai-Burma border opposite Laos, a spot known as the "Golden Triangle", a popular tourist destination.

== Course ==
The Ruak originates within the hills of the Daen Lao Range, Shan State (Burma), and becomes the boundary river between Thailand and Burma at the confluence with the Mae Sai River near the northernmost point of Thailand. It then meanders eastwards until it empties into the Mekong River at Ban Sop Ruak, Tambon Wiang, Chiang Saen District, Chiang Rai Province. The boundary section of the river is 26.75 kilometres (16.62 mi) long.

== See also ==
- Golden Triangle (Southeast Asia)
