= List of Ramsar sites in Thailand =

This list of Ramsar sites in Thailand comprises Thai wetlands deemed to be of "international importance" under the Ramsar Convention. For a full list of all Ramsar sites worldwide, see the Ramsar list of wetlands of international importance.

As of 2020 there are 16 Ramsar sites in Thailand, totalling 405,219 hectares.

According to WWF, wetlands are one of the most threatened of all ecosystems, because of progressive loss of vegetation, salinization, excessive inundation, water pollution, invasive species, development, and road building.

Name	Ramsar ID	Provinces	Area (km^{2})	Designated	Image
Kuan Ki Sian of the Thale Noi Non-hunting Area Wetlands	948	Songkhla	4.94	1998-05	
Bueng Khong Long Non-hunting Area	1098	Nong Khai	22.14	2001-07-05	
Don Hoi Lot	1099	Samut Songkhram	875	2001-07-05	
Krabi River Estuary	1100	Krabi	212.99	2001-07-05	
Nong Bong Kai Non-hunting Area	1101	Chiang Rai	4.34	2001-07-05	
Princess Sirindhorn Wildlife Sanctuary (Pru To Daeng Wildlife Sanctuary)	1102	Narathiwat	201	2001-07-05	
Hat Chao Mai Marine National Park - Ko Libong Non-Hunting Area - Trang River Estuaries	1182	Trang	663.13	2002-08-14	
Kaper Estuary - Laem Son National Park - Kraburi Estuary	1183	Ranong	1220.46	2002-08-14	
Mu Ko Ang Thong Marine National Park	1184	Surat Thani	102	2002-08-14	
Phang Nga Bay Marine National Park	1185	Phang Nga	400	2002-08-14	
Khao Sam Roi Yot Wetlands	1238	Prachuap Khiri Khan	18	2008-01-08	
Bueng Kut Ting	1926	Nong Khai	21.85	2009-06-19	
Ko Kra Archipelago	2152	Nakhon Si Thammarat	3.74	2013-08-12	
Ko Ra-Ko Phra Thong Archipelago	2153	Phang Nga	196.48	2013-08-12	
Lower Songkhram River	2420	Nong Khai, Sakon Nakhon, Nakhon Phanom,	55.045	2019-05-15	
Royal Thai Army Nature Education Center (Bang Pu)	2578	Samut Prakan	1.018	2025-06-25	
Mekong River	-	Chiang Rai		nominated	
Pai River Basin	-	Mae Hong Son		nominated	
Salween River Basin	-	Mae Hong Son, Tak		nominated	
Upper Nan River Basin	-	Nan		nominated	
Khlong Chompu Basin	-	Phitsanulok		nominated	
Bung Boraphet	-	Nakhon Sawan		nominated	
Mekong River	-	Loei		nominated	
Lower Mun River Basin and Mekong River	-	Ubon Ratchathani		nominated	
Inner Gulf of Thailand	-	Chonburi, Chachoengsao, Samut Prakan, Samut Sakhon, Samut Songkhram and Phetchaburi		nominated	
Hin Krud Koh Ram Ra to Ban Klang Ao	-	Prachuap Khiri Khan		nominated	
Chumphon Coast and Wetland	-	Chumphon		nominated	
Ao Ban Don	-	Surat Thani		nominated	
Pak Phanang Coast and Talumphuk Cape	-	Nakhon Si Thammarat		nominated	
Ao Pattani	-	Pattani		nominated	
Songkhla Lake and Coast (Sathing Phra Peninsula)	-	Songkhla and Phatthalung		nominated	
Hat Thai Mueang and Northwestern Coast of Phuket (Tha Chat Chai)	-	Phang Nga and Phuket		nominated	
Trat Mangrove forest	-	Trat		nominated	

== See also ==
- List of protected areas of Thailand
