= Mae Ngoen =

Mae Ngoen แม่เงิน
- Tambon
- Interactive map of Mae Ngoen
- Coordinates: 20°18′18.14″N 100°13′53.72″E
- Country: Thailand
- Province: Chiang Rai
- District: Chiang Saen

Population (2005)
  - Total: 8,463
- Time zone: UTC+7 (ICT)

Mae Ngoen (Thai: แม่เงิน) is a village and tambon (subdistrict) of Chiang Saen District, in Chiang Rai Province, Thailand. In 2005 it had a population of 8,463 people. The tambon contains 12 villages.
