= Yonok subdistrict =

Coordinates: 20.2471°N 100.0695°E

Yonok โยนก
- Tambon
- Interactive map of Yonok
- Country: Thailand
- Province: Chiang Rai
- District: Chiang Saen

Population (2005)
  - Total: 4,777
- Time zone: UTC+7 (ICT)

Yonok Subdistrict (Thai: โยนก) is a village and tambon (subdistrict) of Chiang Saen District, in Chiang Rai Province, Thailand. In 2005 it had a population of 4,777 people. The tambon contains eight villages.
