= Ban Sop Ruak =

Village in Chiang Rai province, Thailand

Coordinates: 20°21′N 100°05′E

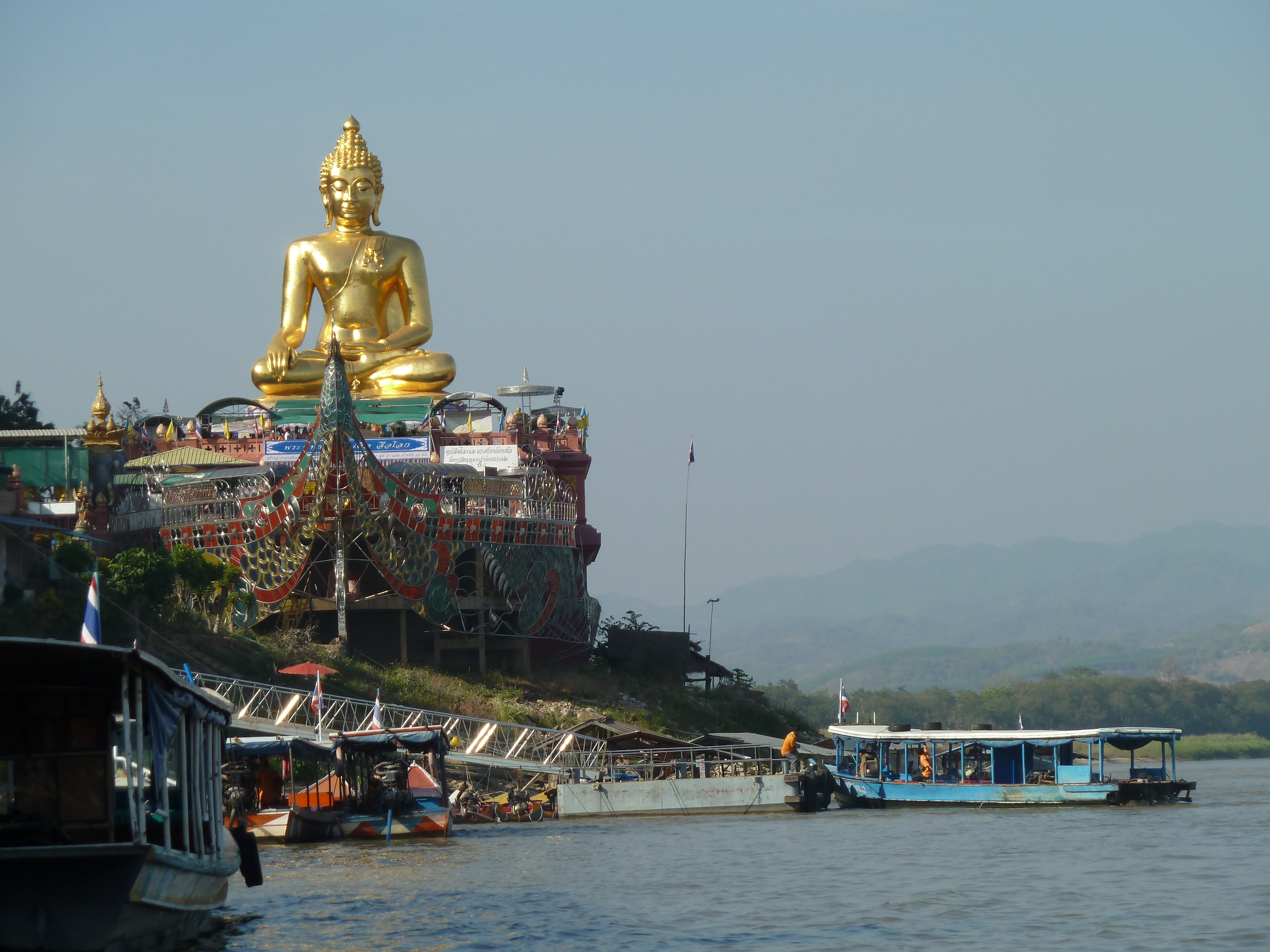
Golden Buddha statue near the Laos-Myanmar-Thailand tripoint monument at Ban Sop Ruak.

Ban Sop Ruak (Thai: บ้านสบรวก) is a village in Wiang subdistrict (tambon) of Chiang Saen District (amphoe) in Chiang Rai Province, northern Thailand. The village is situated at the confluence of the Ruak River and the Mekong River which form the tripoint border of Thailand, Myanmar, and Laos. This location has enabled it to be marketed to tourists as the "heart" of the Golden Triangle, as the area is popularly known.

== Location ==
The village clings along the west bank of the wide Mekong River and its smaller tributary, the Ruak River, with Laos and Myanmar lying across these rivers respectively. Behind the village are the forested hills of Chiang Saen.

== Transportation ==
The village is located along the Road 1290 which runs along the west bank of the Mekong River between Chiang Saen Town and Ban Sop Ruak before moving inland but running parallel to the Ruak River towards Mae Sai. It is 10 km north of the town of Chiang Saen while Mae Sai is 40 km to the northwest. Chiang Rai Town, the capital of the province in which it is situated, is 60 km to the southwest. Buses link Ban Sop Ruak with Chiang Rai via Chiang Saen.

The nearest airport to Ban Sop Ruak is Chiang Rai International Airport which is located about 5 km north of Chiang Rai Town.

Ban Sop Ruak is the location of river border crossings into Laos and Myanmar. The crossing over the Mekong River to Laos is an international border crossing from the Chiang Saen Immigration Thailand-Laos Border Crossing Point located about 500 metres south of the Golden Triange Monument. The Laotian checkpoint is called the Sam Liam Kham (or Golden Triangle) International Checkpoint which is located in the Golden Triangle Special Economic Zone in Bokeo Province. The ferry runs from 6am to 8pm Thai Standard Time and is operated by Kings Romans, the developer of the zone.

The crossing to Myanmar is from the Chiang Saen Immigration Thailand-Myanmar Border Crossing Point which is located about 50 metres west of the Golden Triangle Monument. Small wooden boats ferry passengers to the jetty across the Ruak River. The crossing is mostly used for visitors and workers of the Paradise Resort Golden Triangle and its Win and Win Club Casino.

Boats also available to ferry passengers from Ban Sop Ruak to Chiang Saen Town, often done as part of boat tours of the Mekong River.

== Landmarks ==
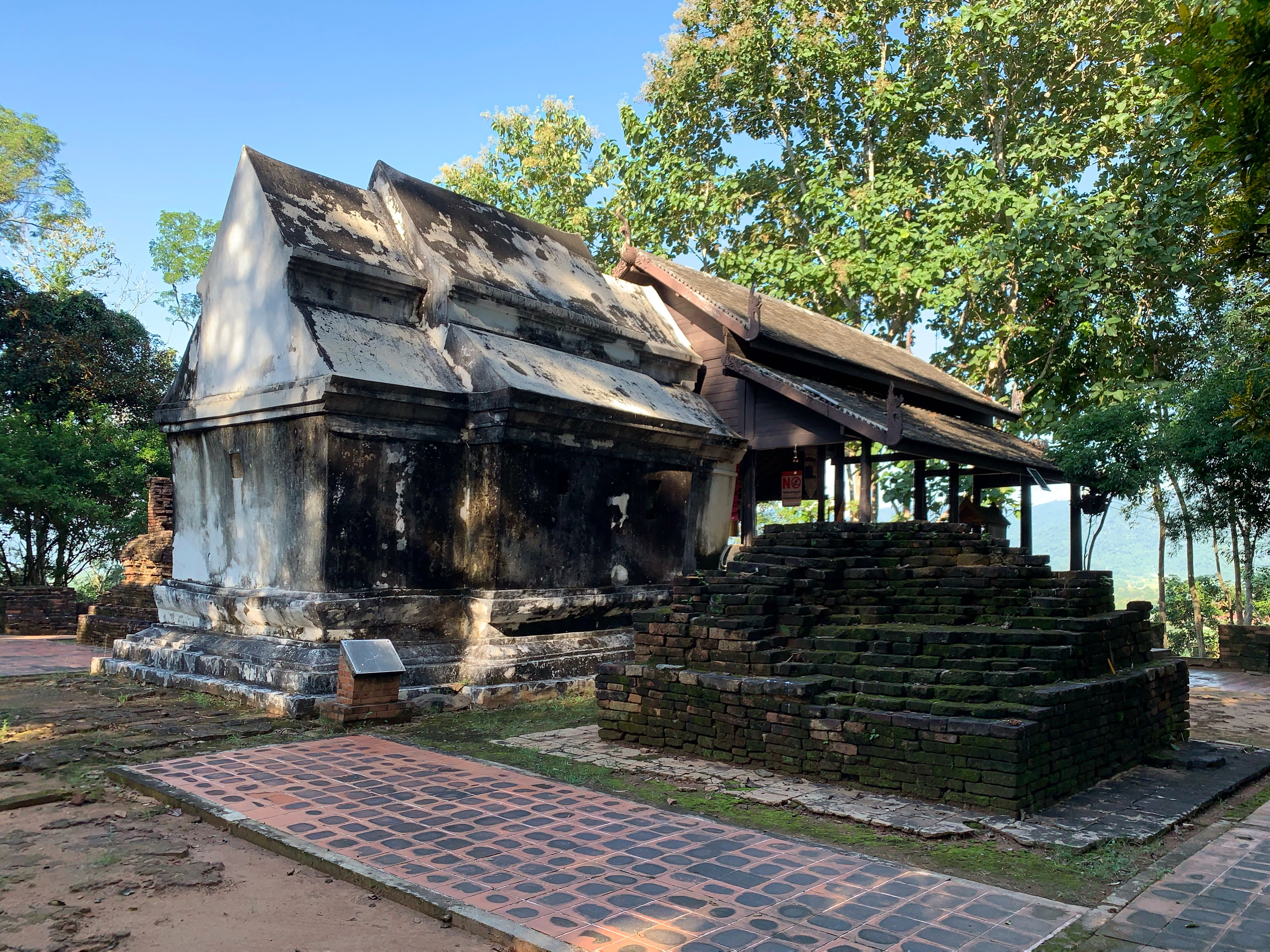
Wat Phra That Doi Pu Khao

=== Golden Triangle Monuments ===
Ban Sop Ruak's claim to fame is its location near the "center" or "heart" of the Golden Triangle area which was previously infamous for being a major opium growing and drug supply area by virtue of being adjacent to the meeting point of Laos, Myanmar and Thailand. Several monuments have been constructed to mark this spot, including a border reference pillar, arches, photography lookout points and signboards.

A huge golden statue of Buddha called the Phra Chiang Saen Si Phaendin sitting on a boat, together with other Buddhist symbols and animal statues have been constructed on the bank of the Mekong River at the mouth of the Ruak River. Jetties for boats for Mekong River tours are also located nearby, while cafes, restaurants, hotels line Ban Sop Ruak's main road.

=== Hall of Opium Museum and House of Opium ===
The Hall of Opium Museum is the larger of two museums dedicated to the drug that made area become labelled by the CIA as the Golden Triangle. The huge museum, owned by a Thai Royal Family foundation, gives a historical account of poppy growing and opium as well as other drug production in an interesting display. The museum and its surrounding park lies about 1 km north of Ban Sop Ruak. A smaller private-owned House of Opium is located in the center of Ban Sop Ruak about 100 metres south of the Golden Triangle Monument.

=== Other temples ===
Besides Phra Chiang Saen Si Phaendin, other temples in Ban Sop Ruak are the Wat Sop Ruak and Wat Phra That Doi Pu Khao which is located on top of a hill with a lookout over the Mekong River-Ruak River confluence.

== See also ==
- Golden Triangle
- Golden Triangle Special Economic Zone

== Gallery ==
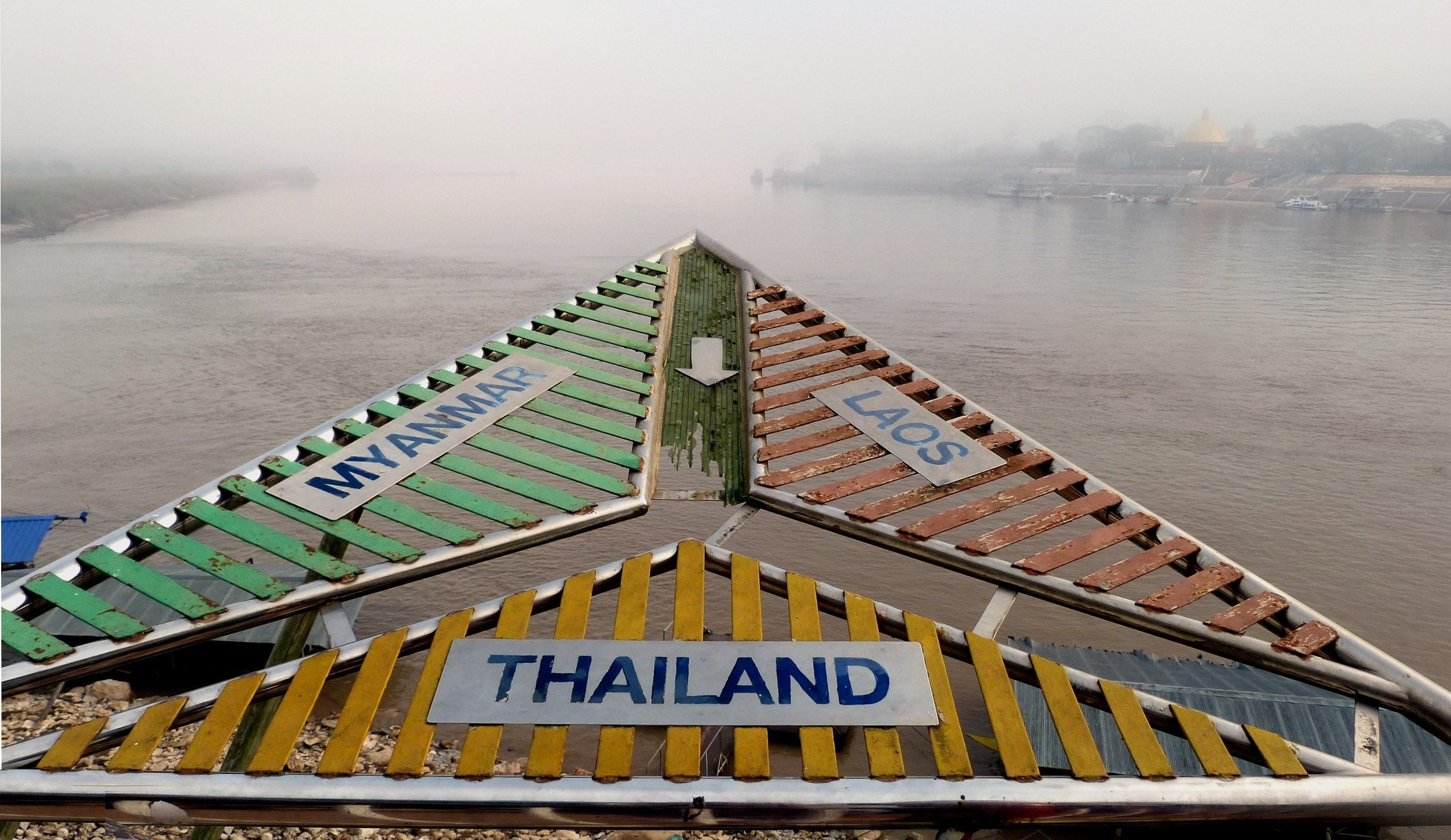
Tripoint where Laos, Myanmar and Thailand meet, in the middle of the Mekong River

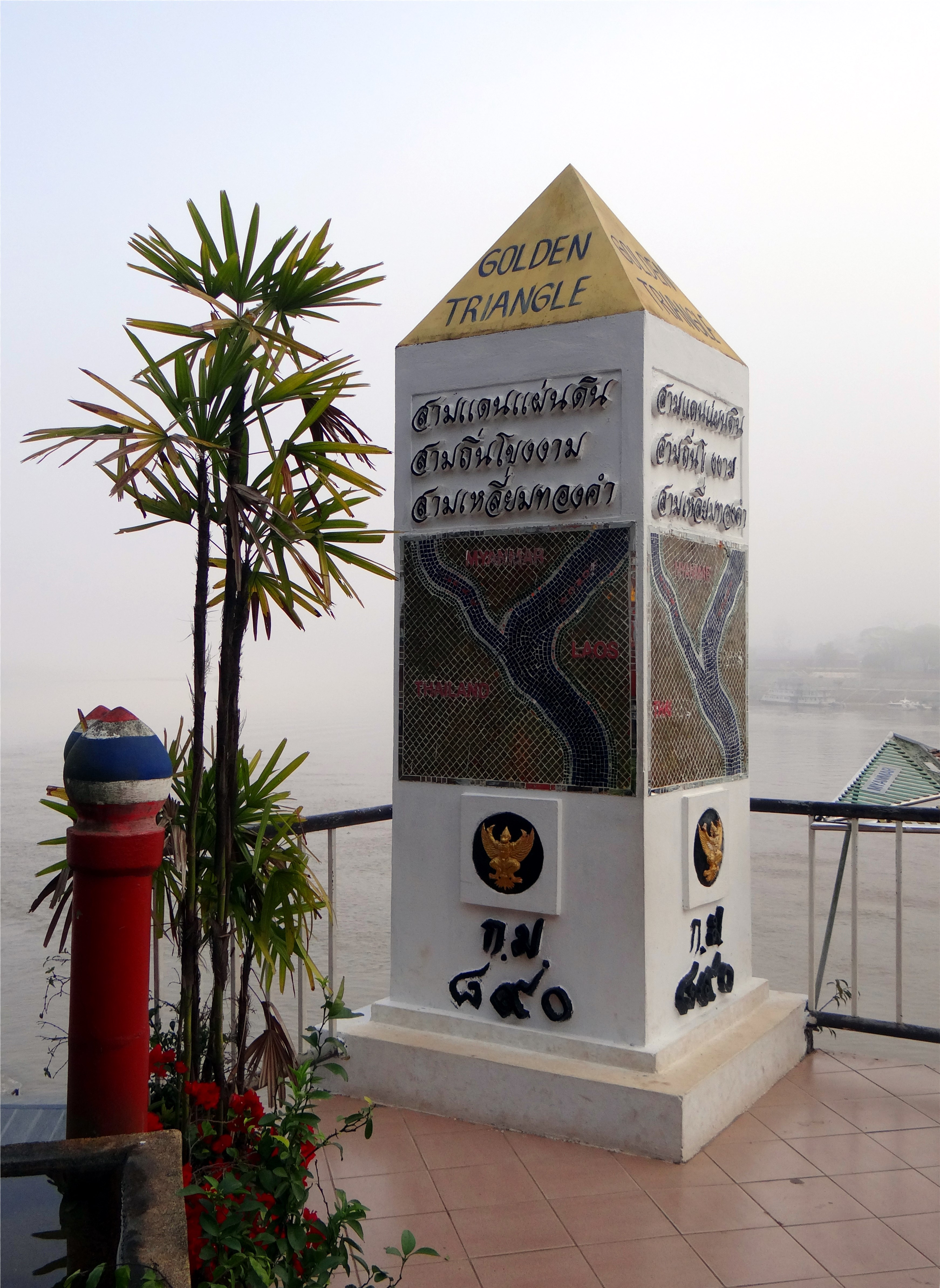
Golden Triangle Monument

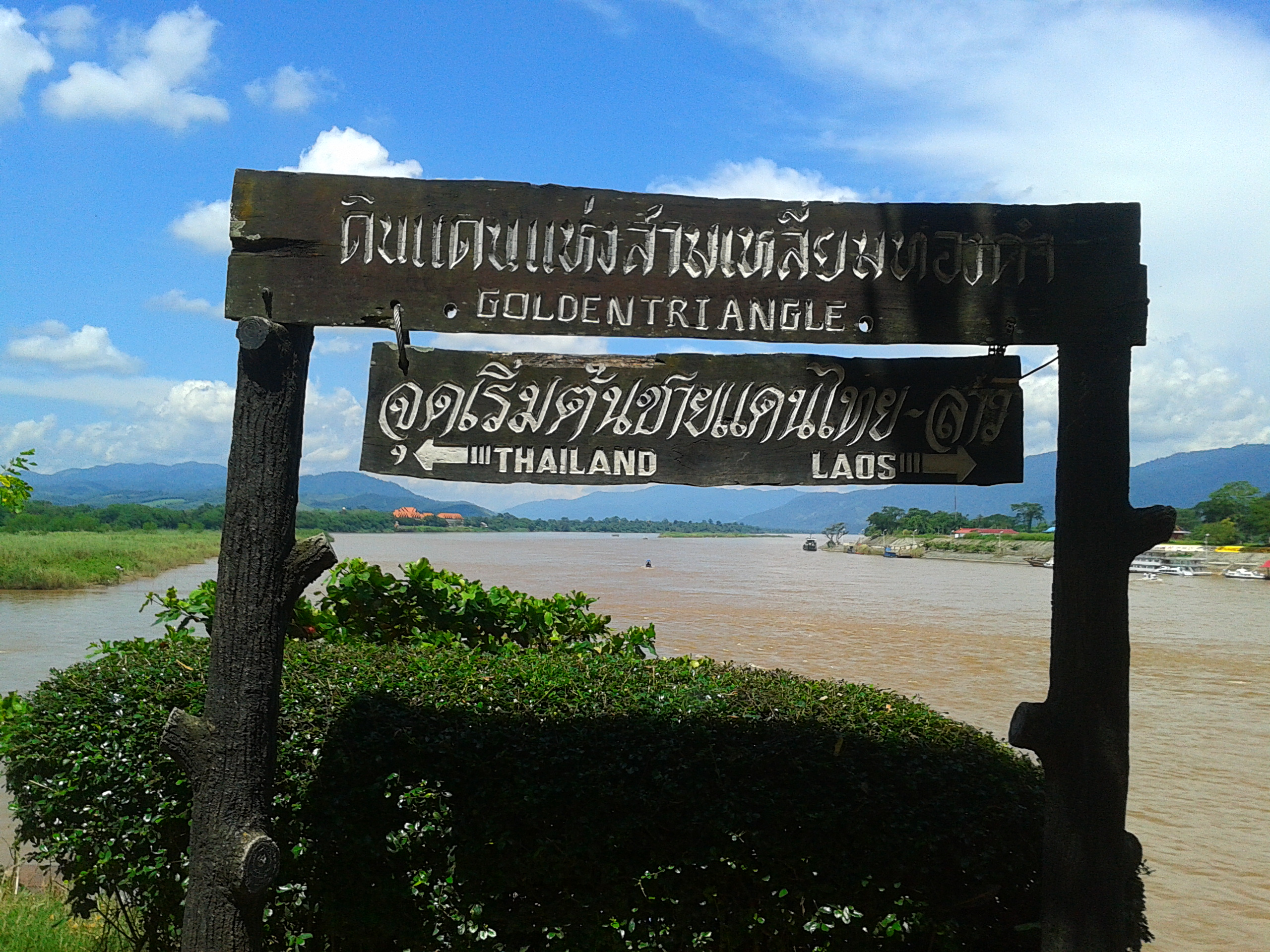
Golden Triangle signboard with the tripoint in the background

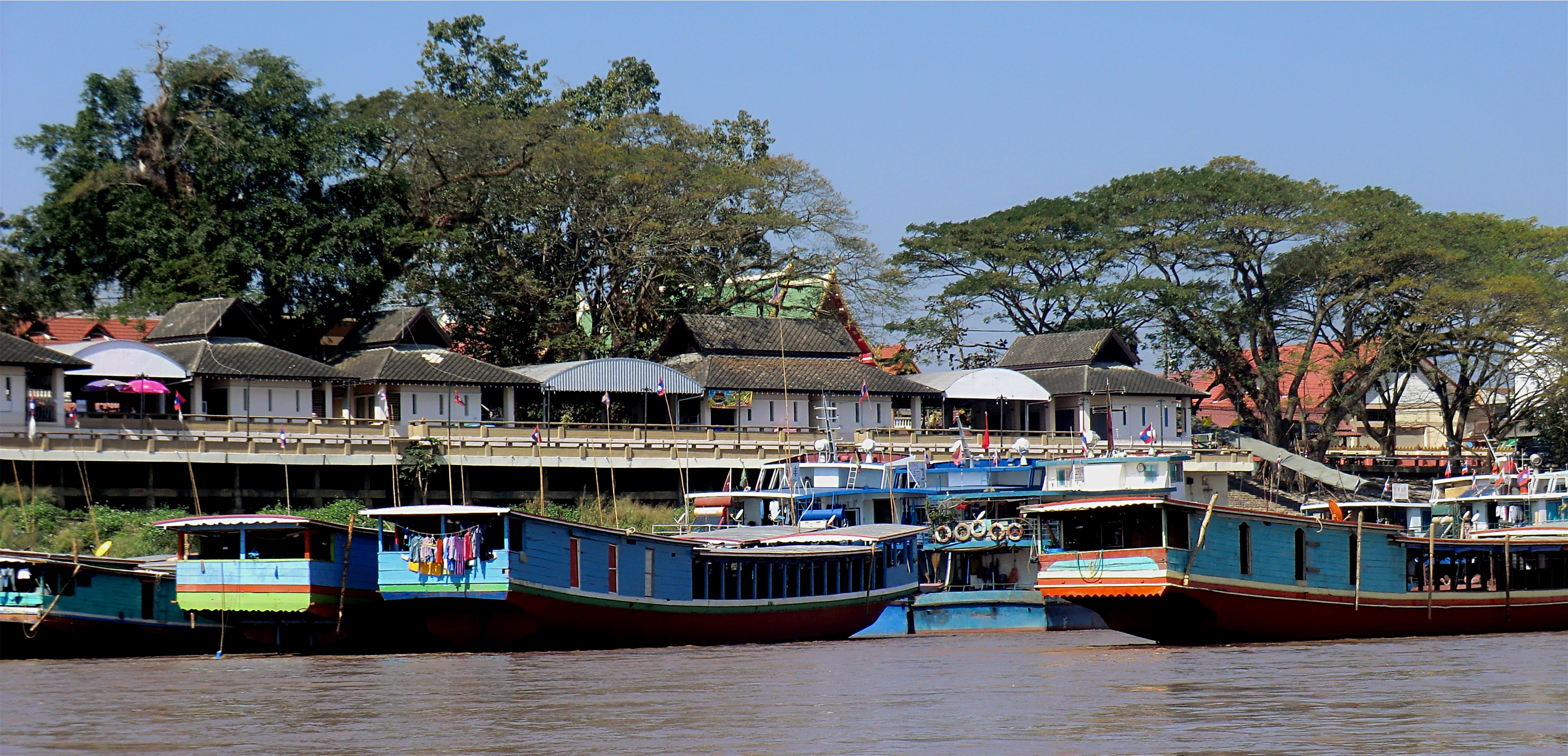
Sop Ruak on the banks of the Mekong River

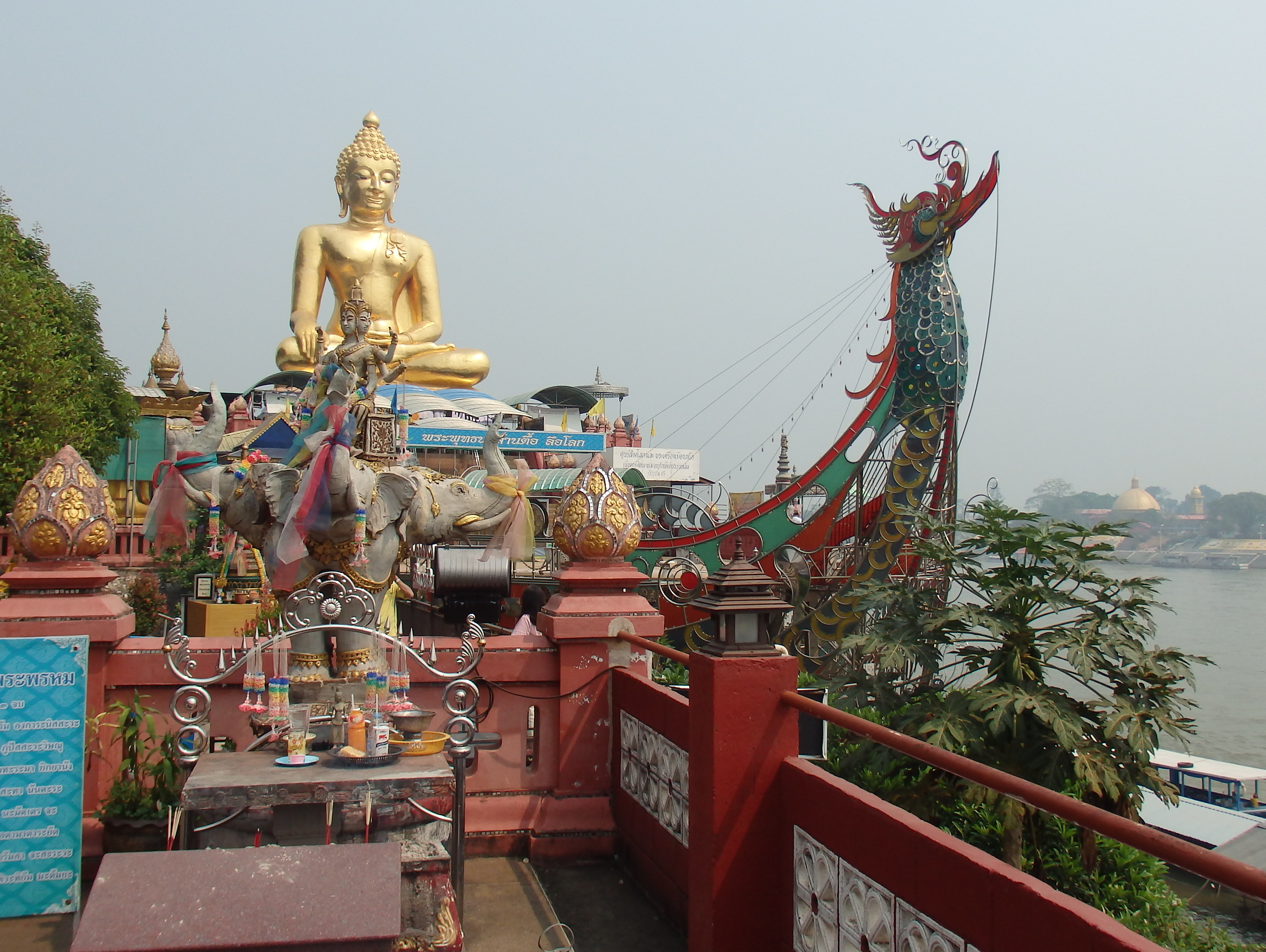
The Golden Buddha or Phra Chiang Saen Si Phaendin

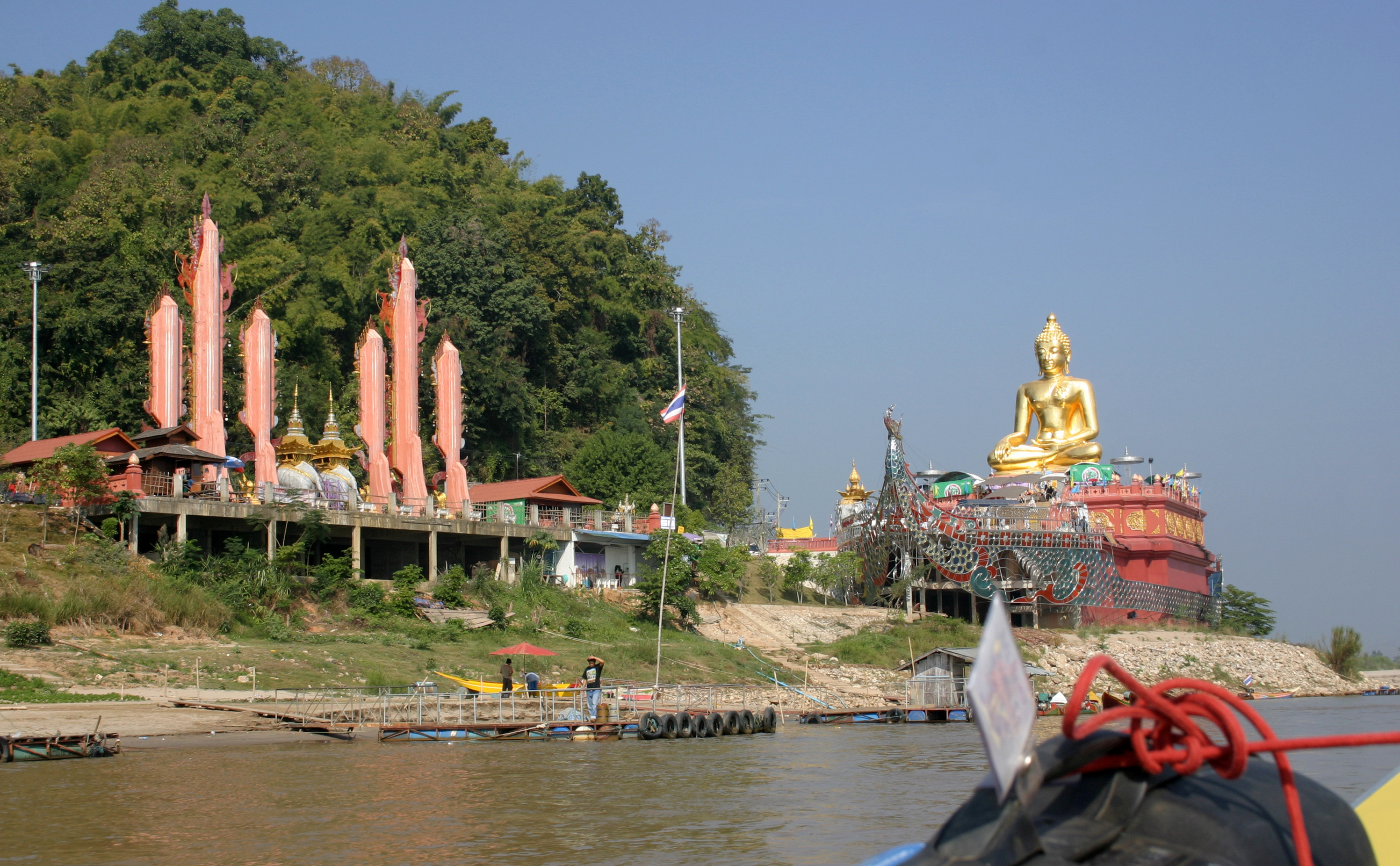
The Golden Buddha or Phra Chiang Saen Si Phaendin

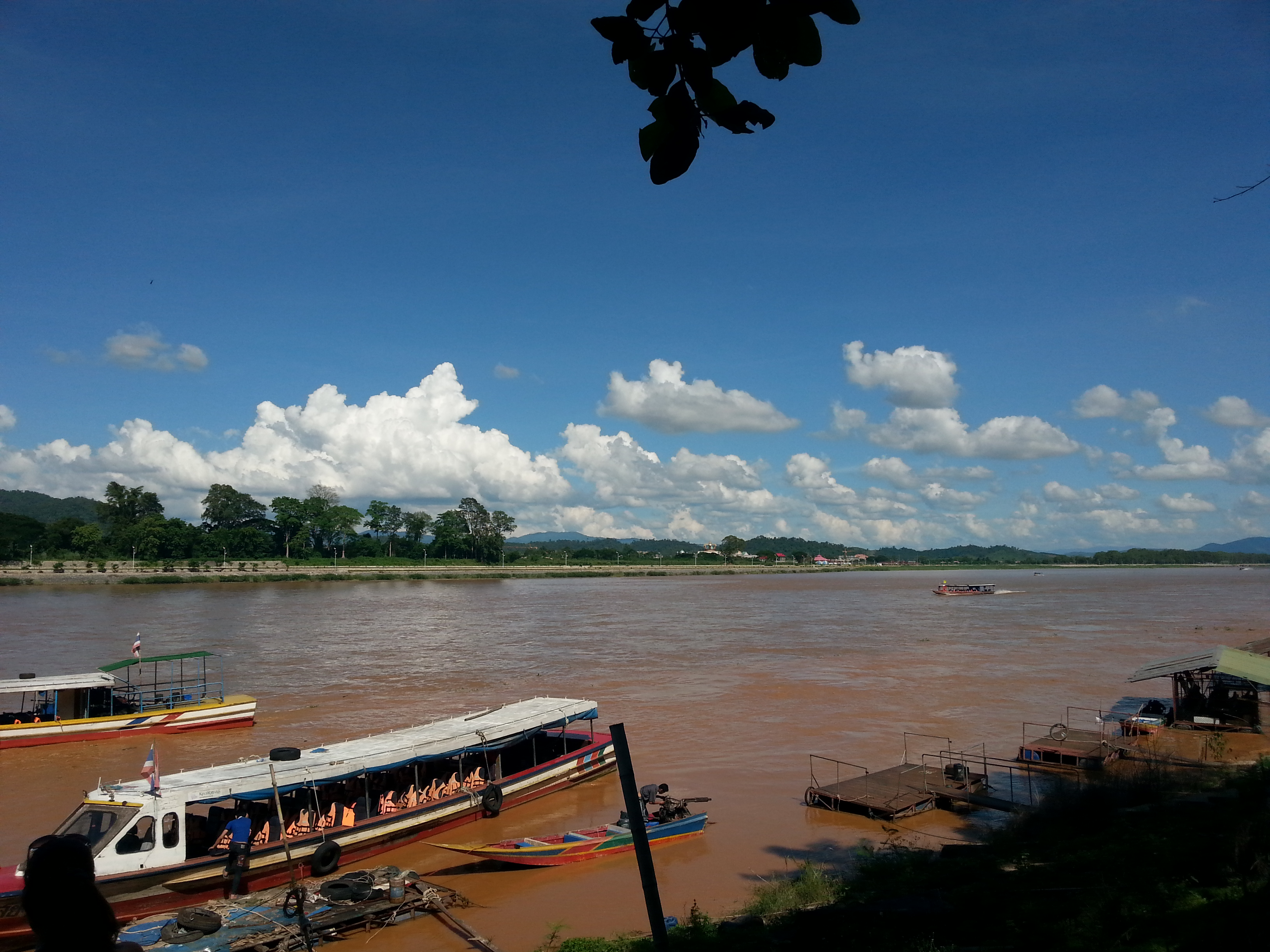
Mekong River tour boats, with Laos in the background

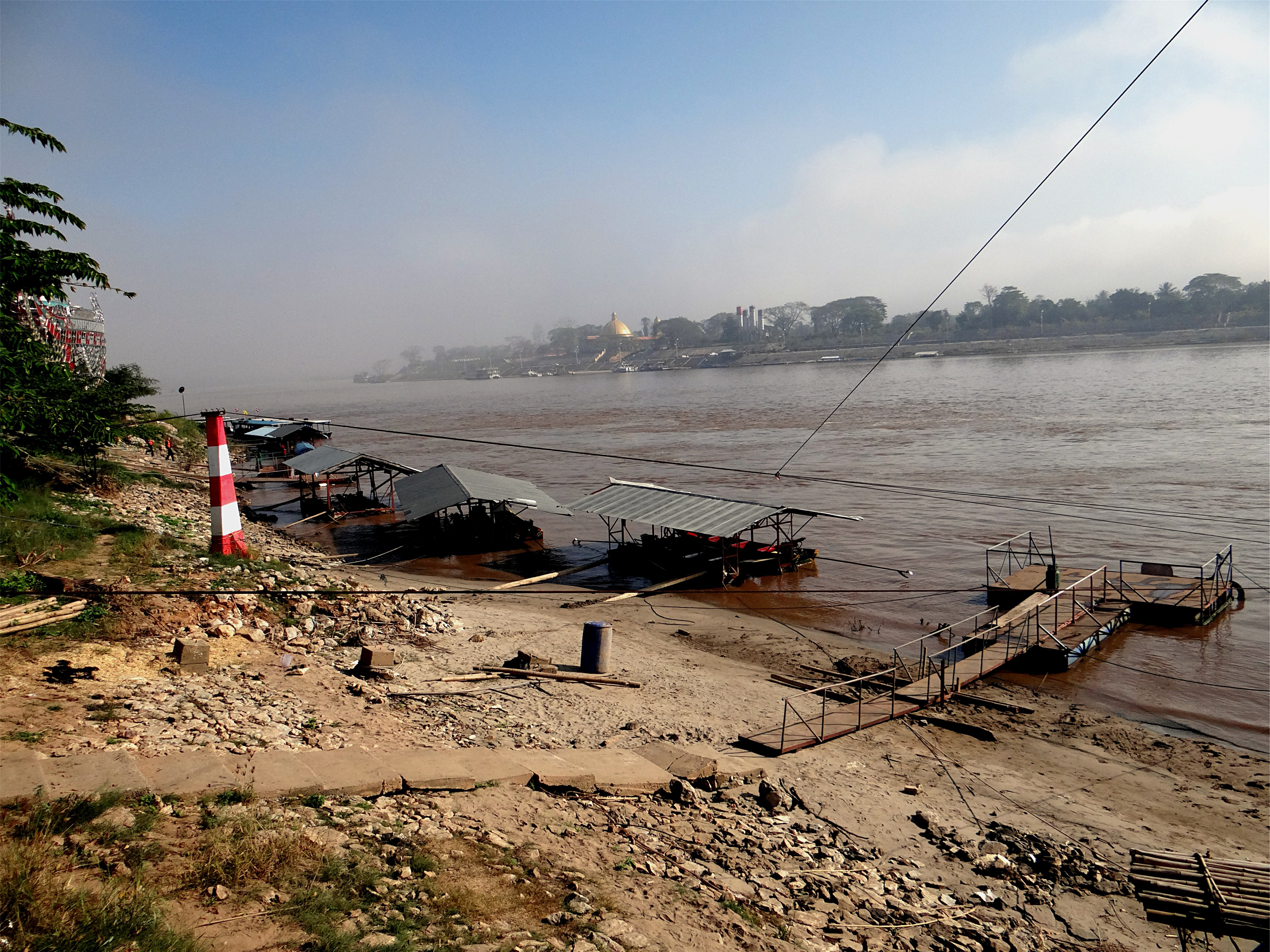
Thai river bank with the Golden Triangle Special Economic Zone in Laos across the Mekong River

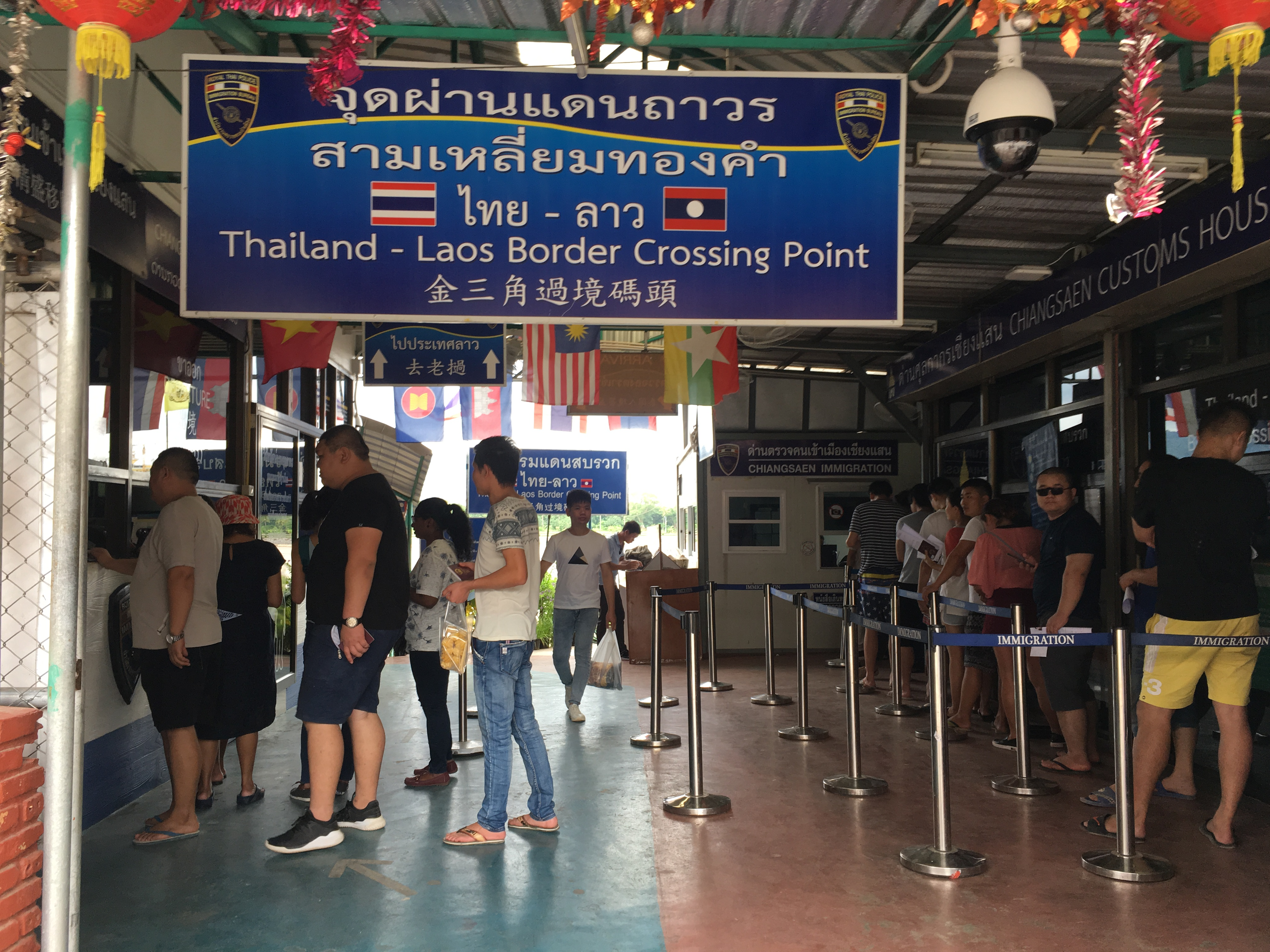
Thailand-Laos border crossing checkpoint

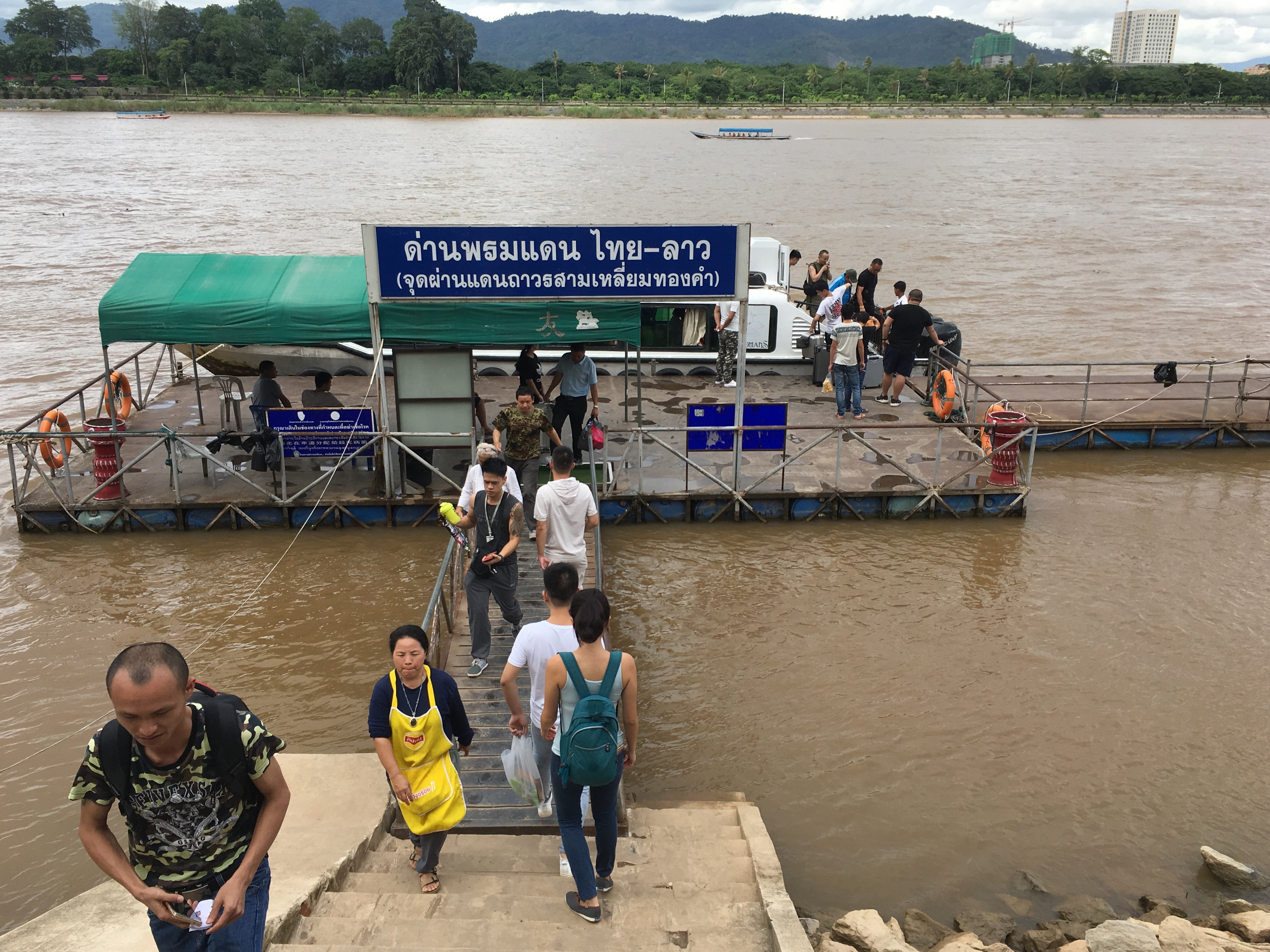
Thailand-Laos border crossing checkpoint jetty with Laos across the river

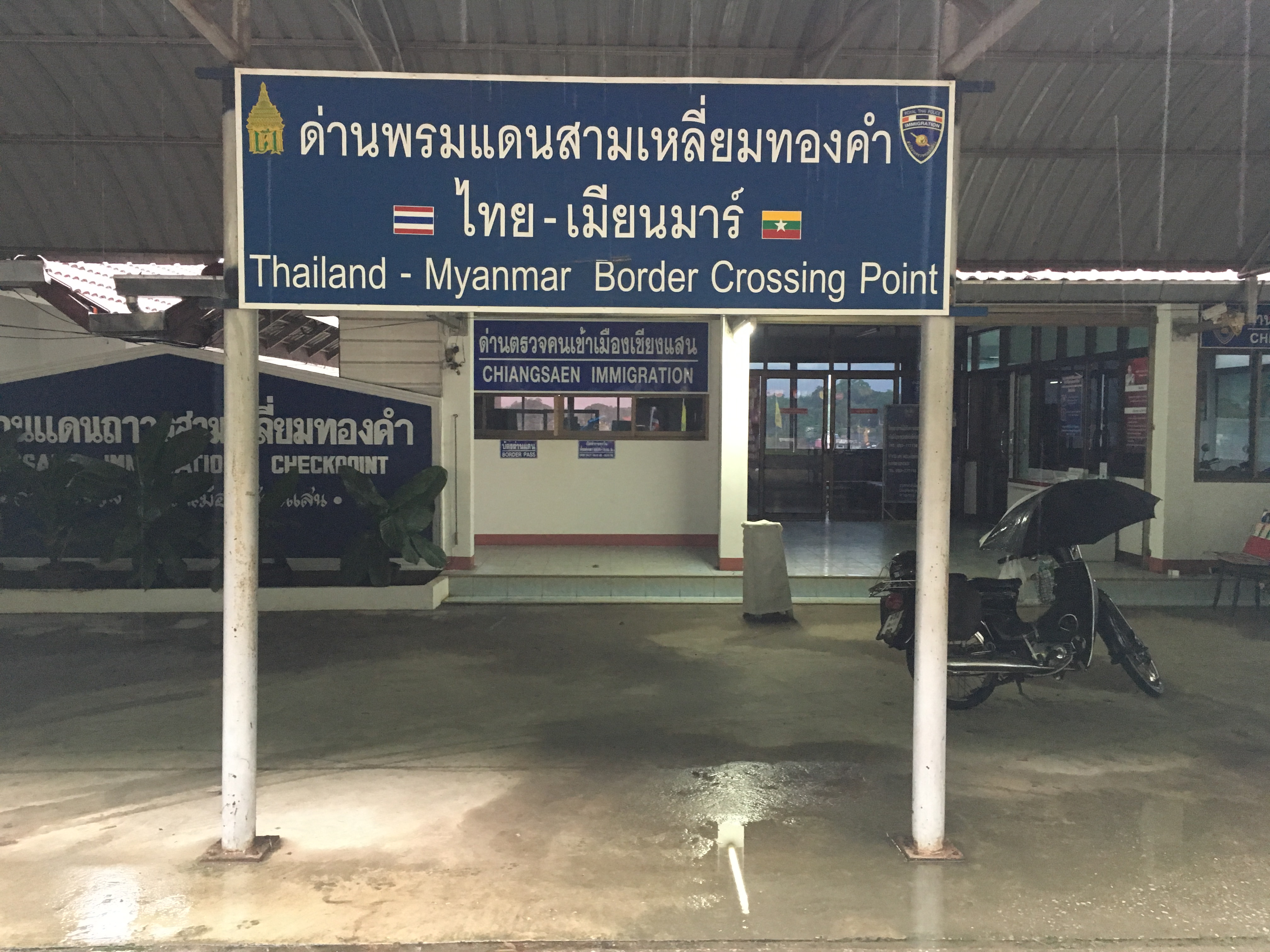
Thailand-Myanmar border crossing checkpoint located northwest of the Golden Triangle Monument

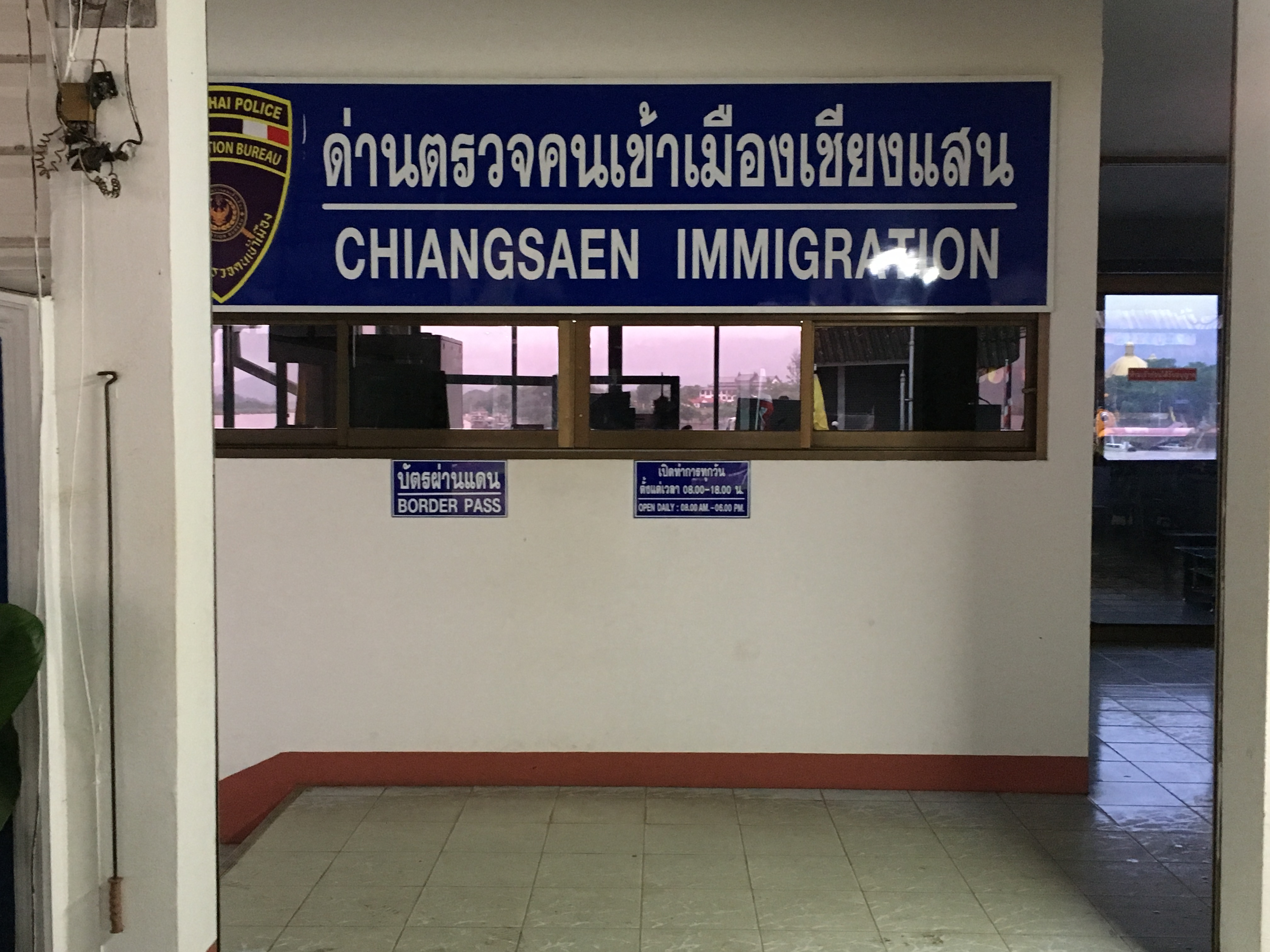
Thailand-Myanmar border crossing checkpoint

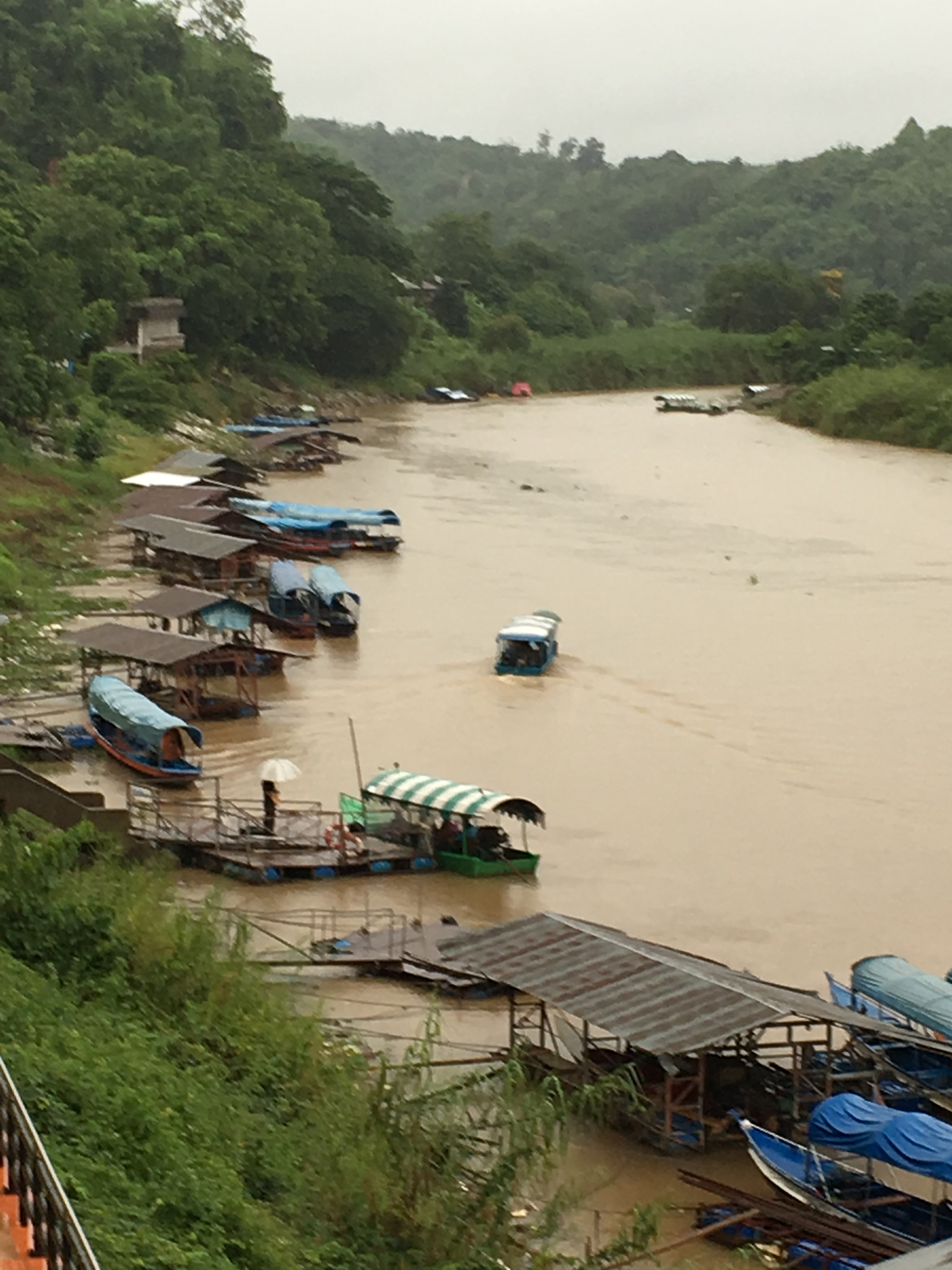
Boats crossing the border from Thailand (left) to Myanmar (right) across the Ruak River
