= Si Don Mun =

Coordinates: 20.3397°N 100.0249°E

Si Don Mun ศรีดอนมูล
- Tambon
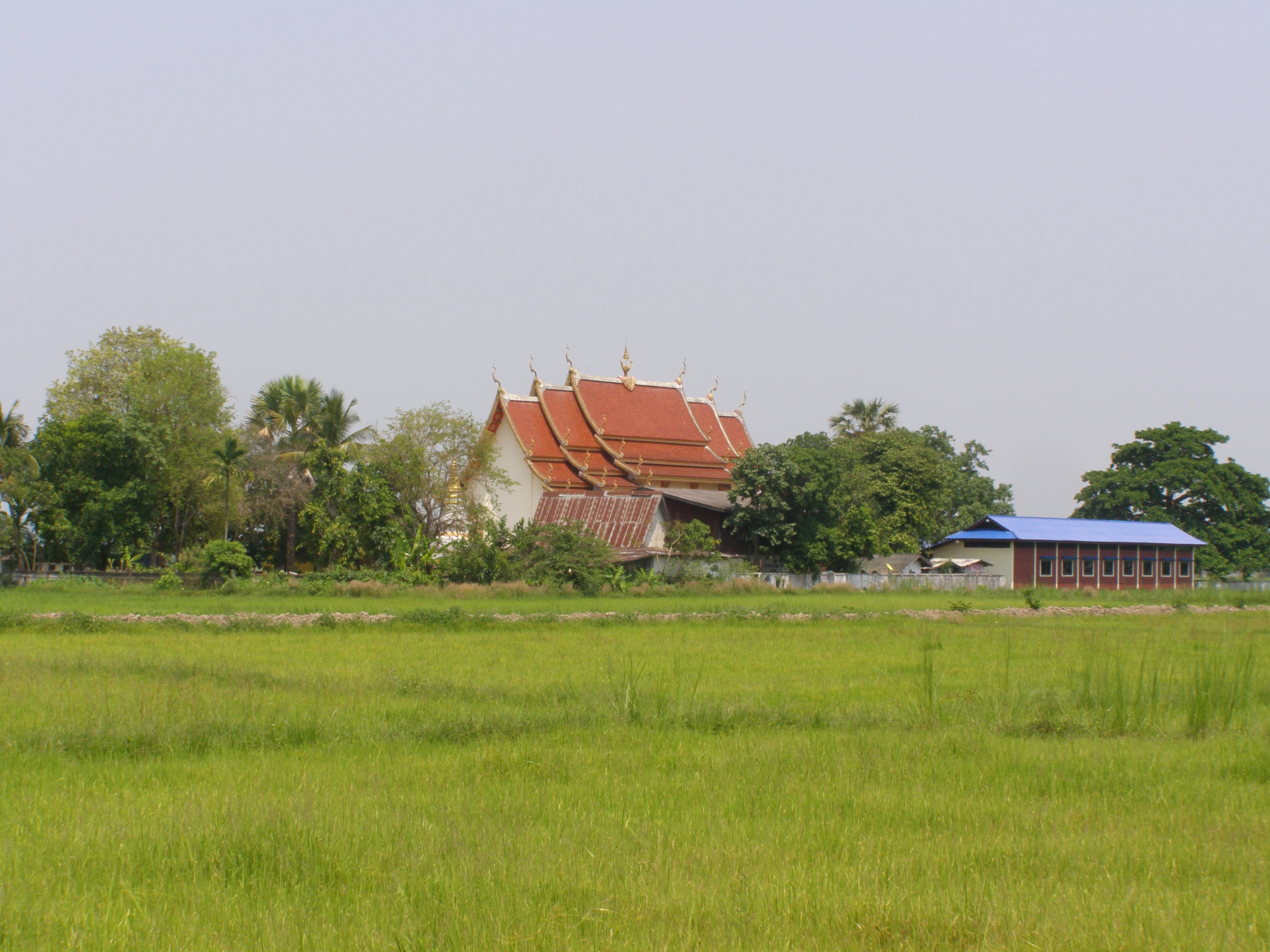
- Wat Sribuen Yuen at village Sribuen Yuen
- Interactive map of Si Don Mun
- Country: Thailand
- Province: Chiang Rai
- District: Chiang Saen

Population (2005)
  - Total: 8,120
- Time zone: UTC+7 (ICT)

Si Don Mun (Thai: ศรีดอนมูล) is a village and tambon (subdistrict) of Chiang Saen District, in Chiang Rai Province, Thailand. In 2005 it had a population of 8,120 people. The tambon contains 14 villages.
