= Chiang Saen district =

Chiang Saen เชียงแสน
- District
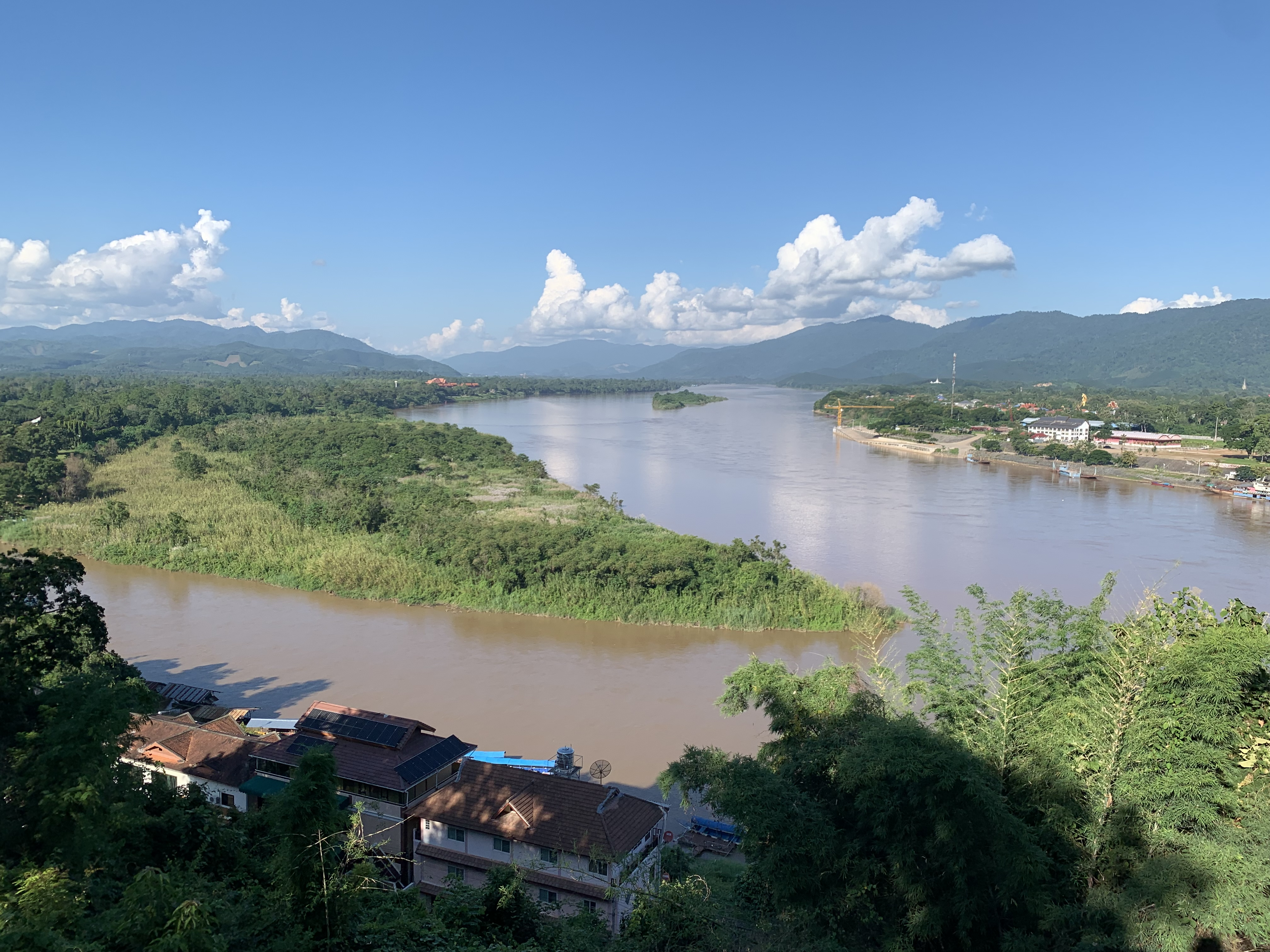
- confluence of Ruak River and Mekong Rivers, view from Wat Phra That Doi Pu Khao in Ban Sop Ruak

- District location in Chiang Rai province
- Coordinates: 20°16′30″N 100°5′18″E
- Country: Thailand
- Province: Chiang Rai
- Seat: Wiang

Area
  - Total: 554.0 km^{2} (213.9 sq mi)

Population (2015)
  - Total: 53,500
  - Density: 99.2/km^{2} (257/sq mi)
- Time zone: UTC+7 (ICT)
- Postal code: 57150
- Geocode: 5708

Chiang Saen (Thai: เชียงแสน, pronounced [tɕʰīaŋ sɛ̌ːn]; Northern Thai: ᨩ᩠ᨿᨦᨽᩯ᩠ᨶ, pronounced [tɕīaŋ sɛ̌ːn]) is a district (amphoe) in the northern part of Chiang Rai province, northern Thailand. Chiang Saen is an important entrepôt for Thailand's trade with other countries on the upper part of Mekong River.

== History ==
According to an ancient chronicle, the original city of Chiang Saen (Chiang: 'offshoot', saen: '100,000') was built in 673 BCE in an area called Yonok by Tai migrants from the Chinese province of Yunnan, and was an important city (Southeast Asia Mandala-model mueang) of the Lanna ('million paddies') Kingdom. No reliable written history of the city exists until the arrival of King Mengrai in the 13th century. His grandson, Saen Phu, ruler of the Lanna Kingdom, founded Chiang Saen in 1325 or 1328.

The city was sacked by Chao Kawila of Chiangmai during the reign of Rama I, because it had been the Burmese base of operations in the preceding years. The city was deserted, while its inhabitants resettled in other Bangkok-allied Lanna cities such as Lampang and Chiang Mai. Several ancient ruins are found in the old cities. For example, Wat Pa Sak hosts a well-preserved Lanna-style phrathat.

The mueang was converted into a district at the beginning of the 20th century in the Thesaphiban reforms, with an additional branch or minor district (king amphoe) also named Chiang Saen covering the central area. The minor district was abolished in 1925. The minor district was recreated two years later, then named Chiang Saen Luang (เชียงแสนหลวง). In 1939 the minor district was renamed Chiang Saen, while the former district Chiang Saen became Mae Chan. The minor district was upgraded to a full district on 6 April 1957.

== Geography ==
The Mekong River borders the north end of the district, forming the boundary with Laos. Other important rivers are the Kok and the Ruak River, tributaries of the Mekong. The 1,328 m high Doi Luang Pae Mueang massif (ดอยหลวงแปเมือง) of the Phi Pan Nam Range rises at the eastern end of the district.

Neighbouring districts are (from the east clockwise) Chiang Khong, Doi Luang, Mae Chan, and Mae Sai of Chiang Rai Province. To the north is the Shan State of Myanmar and Bokeo province of Laos.

The area around the confluence of the Mekong with the Ruak River is known as the Golden Triangle. This boundary region with Laos and Myanmar is now a popular tourist area, with several casinos on the Burmese side.

== Administration ==
The district is divided into six sub-districts (tambons), which are further subdivided into 72 villages (mubans). Wiang Chiang Saen is a township (thesaban tambon) which covers parts of tambon Wiang. There are a further six tambon administrative organizations (TAO).

| No. | Name | Thai name | Villages | Pop. |
|---|---|---|---|---|
| 1. | Wiang | เวียง | 10 | 10,807 |
| 2. | Pa Sak | ป่าสัก | 13 | 8,337 |
| 3. | Ban Saeo | บ้านแซว | 15 | 11,444 |
| 4. | Si Don Mun | ศรีดอนมูล | 14 | 8,120 |
| 5. | Mae Ngoen | แม่เงิน | 12 | 8,463 |
| 6. | Yonok | โยนก | 8 | 4,777 |

== Economy ==
Chiang Saen is to be the site of the Trin Nakara Golden Triangle, a 40 billion baht mixed-used project built by the Innovation Group Co Ltd. It will occupy 3,139 rai in three Chiang Saen sub-districts: Wiang, Pa Sak, and Yonok. The site will include zones for luxury holiday facilities, and with what Trin calls a world-class health centre, condominiums, a premium shopping complex, souvenir shops, an international convention centre and community and local product OTOP stores. The project is expected to create over 10,000 jobs, ranging from labourers to service professionals and industry experts.

The Chiang Saen district is to be the site of the world's tallest flagpole when it is completed in 2020. The pole, to be 189 m tall, the equivalent of a 63-story building, will take about a year to complete at a cost of from 250 million baht to two billion baht. The originator of the project, Mr Trin Nilprasert, aims to promote "Thainess" and Thai identity. The flagpole is to be set in a park complete with a museum and a learning centre. It will fly a Thai flag measuring 60 metres wide by 40 metres and will be visible from 20 kilometres away.
