= Golden Triangle (Southeast Asia) =

Opium-producing region in Southeast Asia

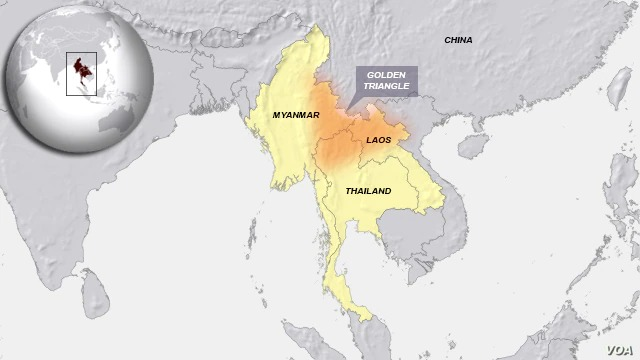
- Location in Southeast Asia

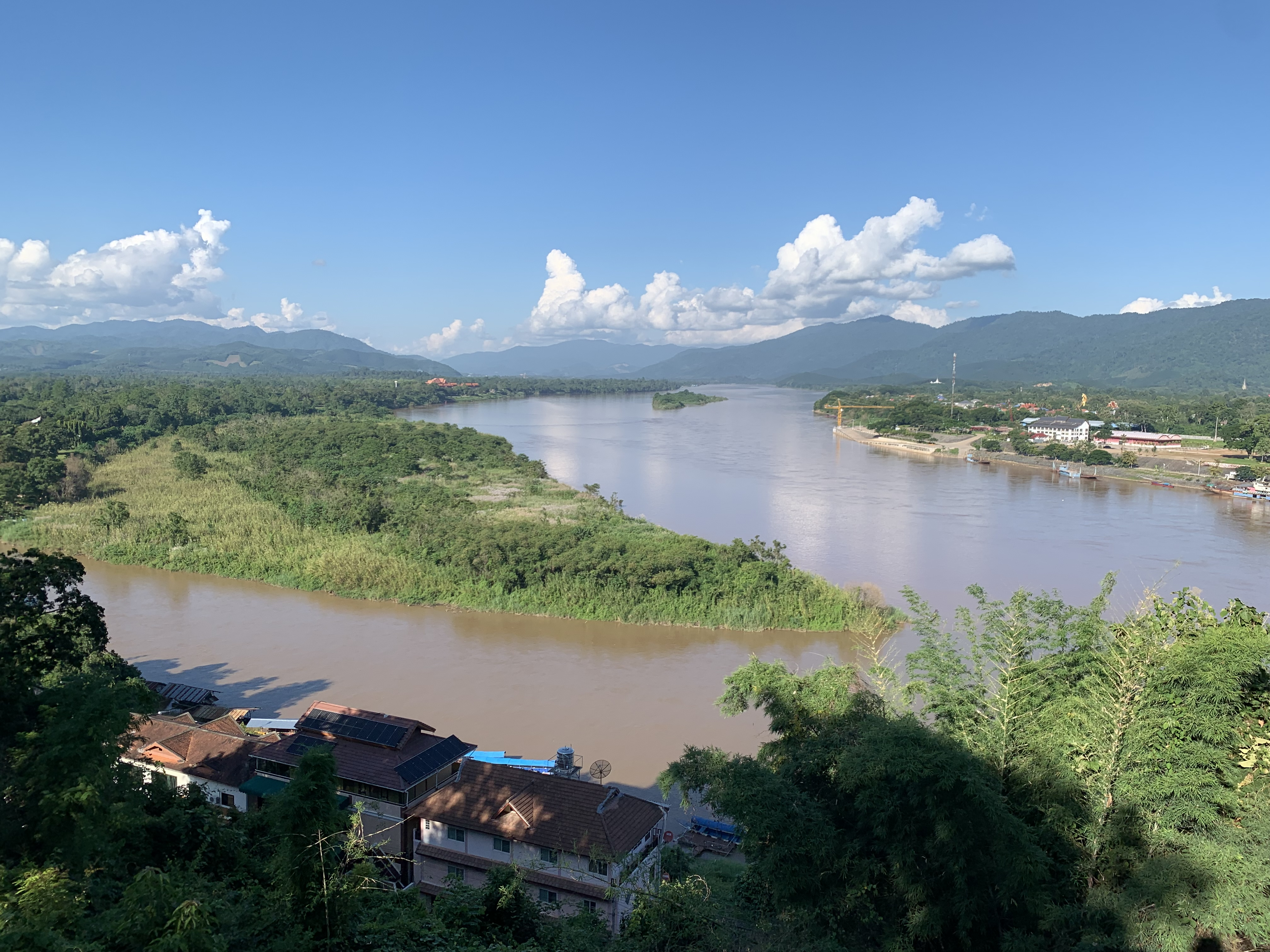
- Confluence of the Ruak and the Mekong, as seen from Wat Phra That Doi Pu Khao in Ban Sop Ruak, Thailand
- Region: Southeast Asia
- Area: 200,000 km^{2} (77,220 mi^{2})
- Population: c. 7,000,000
- Largest city: Chiang Rai
- Countries: Myanmar; Thailand; Laos
- Climate: Tropical
- Coordinates: 20°21′20″N 100°04′53″E

The Golden Triangle is a large, mountainous region of approximately 200,000 km^{2} (77,000 sq mi) in northeastern Myanmar, Northern Thailand and northern Laos, centered on the confluence of the Ruak and Mekong rivers.

The Golden Triangle has been one of the largest opium-producing areas of the world since the 1950s. Most of the world's heroin came from the Golden Triangle until the early 21st century when opium production in Afghanistan (located in the Golden Crescent) increased. Myanmar was the world's second-largest source of opium after Afghanistan up to 2022, producing some 25% of the world's opium, forming part of the Golden Triangle. While opium poppy cultivation in Myanmar had declined year-on-year since 2015, the cultivation area increased by 33% totalling 40,100 ha (99,000 acres) alongside an 88% increase in yield potential to 790 t (780 long tons; 870 short tons) in 2022 according to the latest data from the United Nations Office on Drugs and Crime (UNODC) Myanmar Opium Survey 2022. The United Nations Office on Drugs and Crime has also warned that opium production in Myanmar may rise again if the economic crunch brought on by COVID-19 and the country's 2021 Myanmar coup d'état persists, with significant public health and security consequences for much of Asia.

In 2023, Myanmar became the world's largest producer of opium after an estimated 1,080 t (1,060 long tons; 1,190 short tons) of the drug was produced, according to a United Nations Office on Drugs and Crime report, while a crackdown by the Taliban reduced opium production by approximately 95% to 330 t (320 long tons; 360 short tons) in Afghanistan for the same year.

Today, the Thai side of the river confluence, Sop Ruak, has become a tourist attraction, with the House of Opium Museum, a Hall of Opium, a Golden Triangle Park, and no opium cultivation.

== Term ==
The name "Golden Triangle" was coined by Marshall Green, a U.S. State Department official, in 1971 in a press conference on the opium trade.

== Geography ==
The following districts make up the approximate geographical area of the Golden Triangle:

Myanmar	Thailand	Laos
Shan State	Chiang Mai	Luang Namtha
	Chiang Rai	Bokèo
	Mae Hong Son	Luang Prabang
	Phayao	Oudomxay
	Lampang	Phongsaly
	Lamphun	Houaphan
	Nan	Xiangkhoang
	Phrae	

== Origin ==
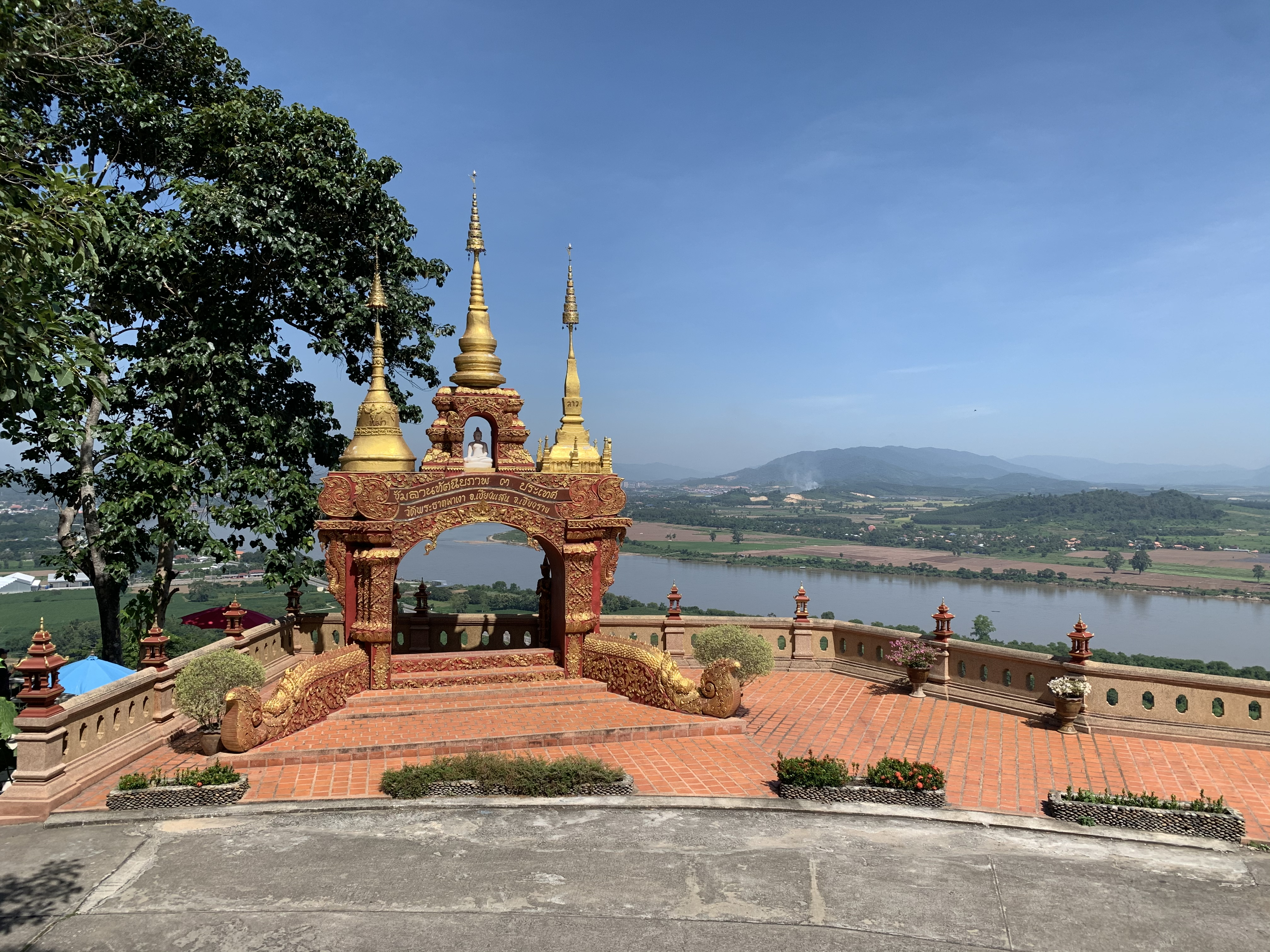
A Golden Triangle monument arch at Wat Phra That Pha Ngao in Ban Sop Ruak

In the late 1940s, as the Chinese Communist Party gained power, it ordered ten million addicts into compulsory treatment, had dealers executed, and opium-producing regions planted with new crops. Consequently, opium production shifted south of the Chinese border into the Golden Triangle region. Small-scale opium production in Myanmar dated back to the Konbaung dynasty in 1750, chiefly for the consumption of foreigners.

The Chinese troops of the Kuomintang in Burma (KMT) were in effect the forebears of the private narcotic armies operating in the Golden Triangle. In 1949, thousands of the defeated Kuomintang troops crossed over the border from Yunnan Province into Burma, a nation with a weak government, and the Kuomintang seized control of the border regions of Burma. Almost all of the KMT opium was sent south to Thailand. The KMT-controlled territories made up Burma's major opium-producing region, and the shift in KMT policy allowed them to expand their control over the region's opium trade. Furthermore, Communist China's eradication of illicit opium cultivation in Yunnan by the early 1950s effectively handed the opium monopoly to the KMT army in the Shan State. The main consumers of the drug were the local ethnic Chinese and those across the border in Yunnan and the rest of Southeast Asia. They coerced the local villagers for recruits, food and money, and exacted a heavy tax on the opium farmers. That forced the farmers to increase their production to make ends meet. One American missionary to the Lahu people of Kengtung State testified that the KMT tortured the Lahu for failing to comply with their regulations.

Annual production increased 20 times, from 30 tons at the time of Burmese independence to 600 t (590 long tons; 660 short tons) in the mid-1950s.

== History of heroin production ==
Major heroin production regions, including the Golden Triangle

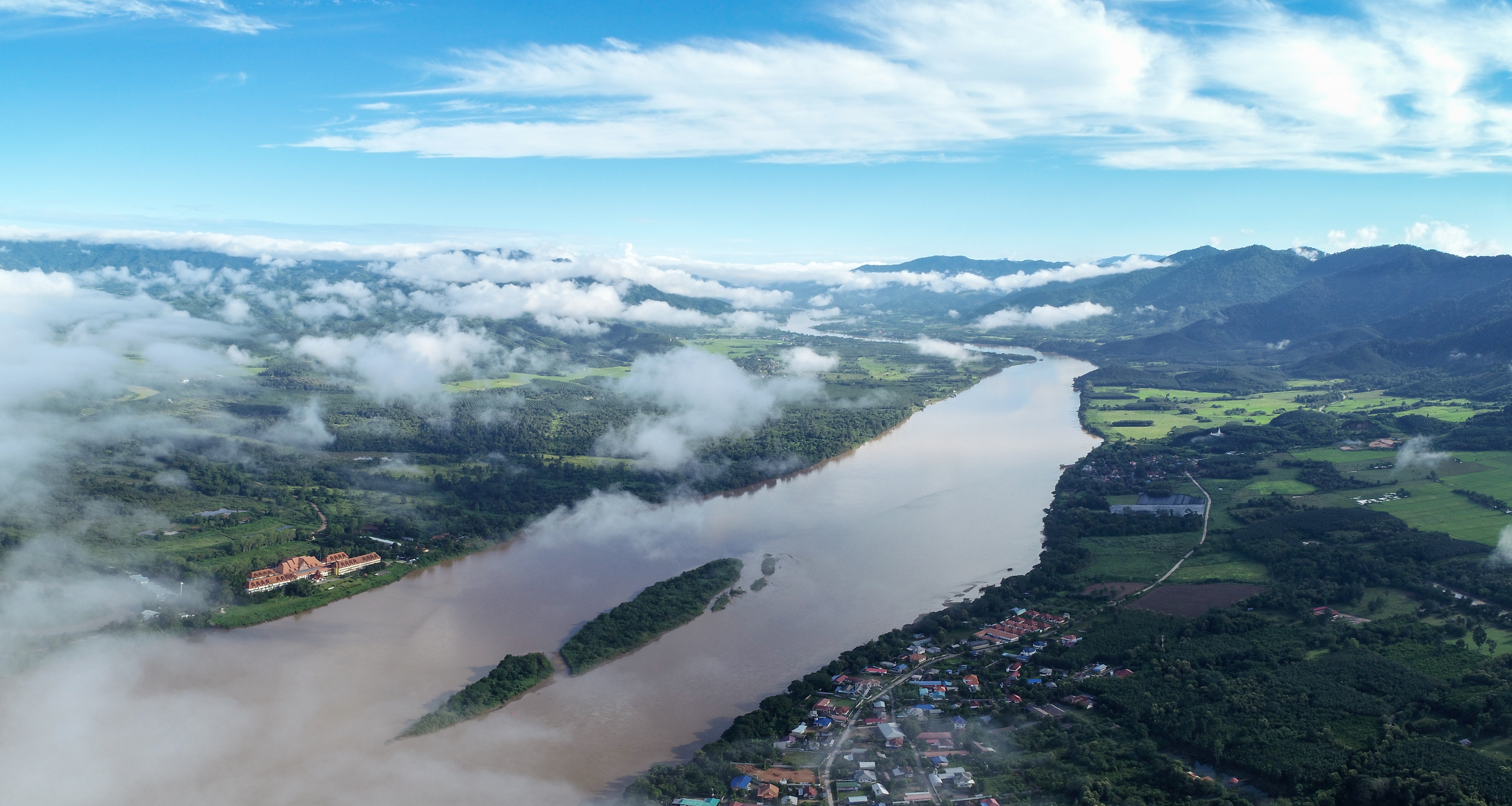
Aerial view of the Mekong at tripoint

Myanmar is the world's largest producer of illicit opium, and has been a significant cog in the transnational drug trade since World War II. According to the UNODC it was estimated that in 2005 opium was cultivated in an area of 430 km^{2} (167 sq mi) in Myanmar. Opium and heroin base produced in northeastern Myanmar are transported by horse and donkey caravans to refineries along the Thailand–Burma border for conversion to heroin and heroin base. Most of the finished products are shipped across the border into various towns in North Thailand and down to Bangkok for further distribution to international markets.

The surrender of drug lord Khun Sa's Mong Tai Army in January 1996 was hailed by Yangon as a major counter-narcotics success. Lack of government will and ability to take on major narcotrafficking groups and lack of serious commitment against money laundering continues to hinder the overall anti-drug effort. Most of the tribespeople growing the opium poppy in Myanmar and in the Thai highlands are living below the poverty line.

In 1996, the United States Embassy in Rangoon released a "Country Commercial Guide", which states "Exports of opiates alone appear to be worth about as much as all legal exports." It goes on to say that investments in infrastructure and hotels are coming from major opiate-growing and opiate-exporting organizations and from those with close ties to these organizations.

A four-year investigation concluded that Myanmar Oil and Gas Enterprise (MOGE) was "the main channel for laundering the revenues of heroin produced and exported under the control of the Myanmar Army." In a business deal signed with the French oil giant Total S.A. in 1992, and later joined by Unocal, MOGE received a payment of $15 million. "Despite the fact that MOGE has no assets besides the limited installments of its foreign partners and makes no profit, and that the Myanmar state never had the capacity to allocate any currency credit to MOGE, the Singapore bank accounts of this company have seen the transfer of hundreds of millions of US dollars," reports François Casanier. According to a confidential MOGE file reviewed by the investigators, funds exceeding $60 million and originating from Myanmar's most renowned drug lord, Khun Sa, were channeled through the company. "Drug money is irrigating every economic activity in Myanmar, and big foreign partners are also seen by the State Law and Order Restoration Council as big shields for money laundering." Banks in Rangoon offered money laundering for a 40% commission. A United Nations report also cites corruption, poverty and a lack of government control as typical causes for impoverished farmers to engage in drug production.

== Heroin processing in Southeast Asia ==
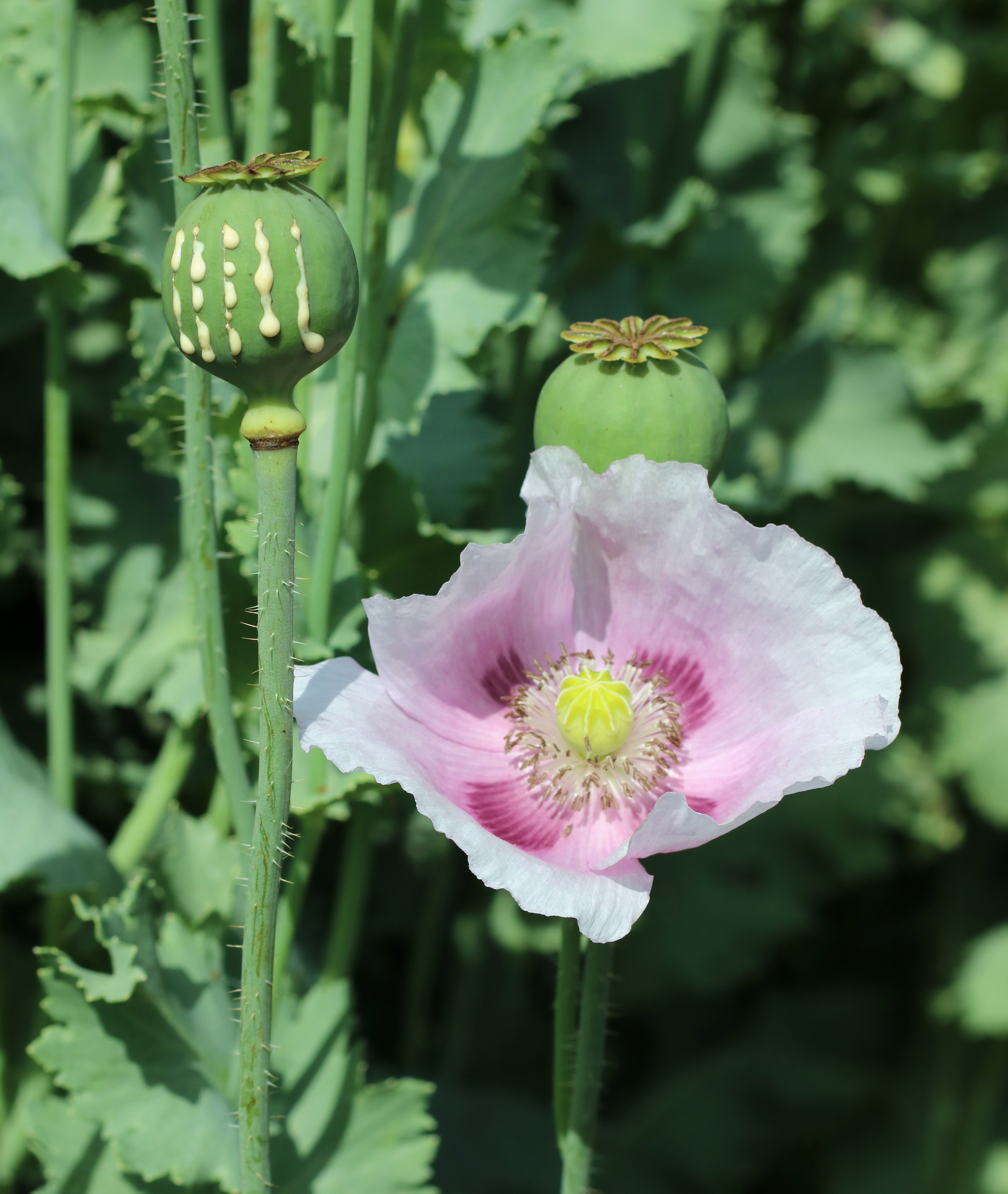
An opium poppy pod with incisions leaking raw opium

In 1992, the United States Department of Justice released a report detailing the typical process in which raw opium extracted from poppy plants is converted to morphine and then to heroin:

- An average Golden Triangle opium farmer will plant an area of 0.5 ha (1.2 acres) (which would produce an average of 50,000 poppy plants) towards the end of the traditional wet season in September, which will allow harvesting to begin in February of the following year when the plant has matured. About two weeks after the flower petals fall from the now swollen pods, the farmer will use a tool with 3 or 4 blades to make 1 mm (0.039 in) deep diagonal incisions in each pod. This is done usually in the afternoon so that the white latex-like raw opium can ooze out onto the surface of the pod overnight.
- The farmer then scrapes the secretion off each pod with a curved tool and places it into a container. This is repeated up to six times until the pod is depleted and stops leaking fluid. Each pod will yield up to 80 mg of raw opium, with the 0.5 ha (1.2 acres) field producing an average of between 4 and 8 kg (8.8 and 17.6 lb) in total.
- The collected opium contains a high percentage of water, so the farmer will dry it in the hot sun for several days as its value increases due to less water weight per kilogram and then cut into standard sized 1.6 kg (3.5 lb) blocks and wrap in plastic ready for sale to opium traders.
- To convert the opium to morphine, approximately 15 kilograms of raw opium is added to 30 gallons of water in a 55-gallon metal oil drum. A fire is lit under the drum and the solution is brought to the boil. After the opium has dissolved, non-soluble materials (such as plant twigs) float to the top and are scooped out. Calcium hydroxide is then added to convert the water insoluble morphine into water-soluble calcium morphenate, with any other alkaloids turning to sludge. After it has cooled, the contents are poured through a filter (like a burlap sack) into a pot and the collected filtered liquid is reheated to a simmer. Ammonium chloride is then added to adjust the pH level to 9, and the liquid is then left to cool for a couple of hours. The morphine base will gradually precipitate out of the solution and settle to the bottom of the pot. The liquid is then poured off through a filter and any chunks collected are added back into the pot. The remaining solids are then scraped out and left to dry in the sun until they turn into a coffee-colored powder, and what is left at the end of this process is a crude morphine base. This is then dissolved in hydrochloric acid, then boiled and filtered several times before being pressed into 1.3 kilogram bricks, which are then transported down from the highlands to heroin-processing laboratories.
- The morphine hydrochloride bricks are broken up into powder and then placed in a pot with acetic anhydride. The pot is then heated to a simmer for approximately two hours, during which the morphine and the anhydride become chemically bonded, creating an impure form of diacetylmorphine. Water is then added, along with charcoal, and after stirring, the liquid is strained out through a filter into a new container. Sodium carbonate is dissolved in hot water and then added slowly, which causes the heroin base to precipitate to the bottom of the container. This is then filtered out and dried in a steam bath for an hour. For every 455 g (16.0 oz) of morphine, approximately 311 g (11.0 oz) of crude heroin base can be extracted. This is then sent to a heroin-refining laboratory.
- Heroin Number 3 is created by mixing crude heroin base with hydrochloric acid, resulting in heroin hydrochloride, which is less than 40% pure and is typically consumed locally by smoking. Adulterants such as caffeine or quinine are added in a one to one ratio, and the wet paste is stirred to dryness over a steam bath. The resulting dry Heroin Number 3 will be in the form of dark brown coarse lumps, which are transferred into 1 kilogram plastic bags and then sold onto wholesale traffickers.
- Heroin Number 4, which is high quality (over 80% pure) and is typically exported abroad for consumption by intravenous injection, is created by mixing crude heroin base with water and acetic anhydride. After stirring, a small amount of chloroform is added. After about 20 minutes, impurities will sink to the bottom of the pot and a red greasy layer will float to the top, and the light yellow water layer in the middle is carefully poured off into a clean container. Charcoal is stirred in, and the liquid is then poured out through a filter into a new, clean pot, and this process is repeated until the liquid becomes clear. Sodium carbonate is dissolved in hot water and then added slowly, which causes the heroin base to precipitate to the bottom of the container. This is filtered out and dried in a steam bath for an hour. The resulting dry Heroin Number 4 will be in the form of a very white, fine powder, which is then pressed into 600 gram blocks (equivalent to a Chinese pound) and wrapped in plastic. These are then sold onto wholesale traffickers.

In the same year, the U.S. Department of Justice published a separate report with estimated prices for Southeast Asian heroin at various stages from point of production to final street sale:

Product	Location	Purity	Estimated Price
Raw Opium	Shan State	100%	$120 to $200 per kilogram
Morphine Base	Thai–Burma border	100%	$1,000 per kilogram
Heroin Base	Chang Mai	100%	$3,520 to $4,400 per kilogram
Heroin	Chang Mai	90% to 70%	$4,000 to $4,900 per kilogram
Heroin	Bangkok	90% to 70%	$6,000 to $11,000 per kilogram
Heroin	U.S.A (wholesale)	90% to 70%	$90,000 to $240,000 per kilogram
Heroin	U.S.A (mid level)	80% to 30%	$100,000 to $600,000 per kilogram
Heroin	U.S.A (street level)	60% to 20%	$100,000 to $1,000,000 per kilogram

== Historical drug trafficking ==
=== 1970s ===
After hearing about African American soldiers serving in the Vietnam War becoming addicted to heroin while on rest and recuperation (R&R) in Thailand, American drug lord Frank Lucas travelled to Bangkok in the early 1970s in an attempt to set up a new trafficking route with his associate Ike Atkinson. After Lucas visited the Golden Triangle region and made an initial purchase of 132 kilograms of uncut heroin (98–100% pure) from remnants of Chiang Kai-shek's defeated Kuomintang army (for a price of $4,200 per kilogram compared to the $50,000 each that the New York Mafia charged), Atkinson used his contacts within the US military to smuggle the narcotics via US Air Force planes back to the eastern United States. It was then collected, cut to 10% purity, repackaged and distributed on the streets of Harlem by dealers controlled by Lucas for a vast profit. This smuggling route operated up until the arrest of Frank Lucas by the Drug Enforcement Administration in January 1975.

In 1972, traditional European supply routes for American-consumed heroin (known as the French Connection) were disrupted after Turkey banned the growing of opium poppies, which led to an increase in production in South East Asia. With an existing Triad organized crime infrastructure to service a large local population of addicts (consisting of an estimated 150,000 regular users), combined with its busy international Port of Hong Kong and Kai Tak Airport, Hong Kong soon became an important transit point for Southeast Asian heroin, as well as convenient money laundering center to reinvest the profits of international sales. Crime groups also used the city state as a location to process opium into refined heroin, with a syndicate controlled by Ma Sik-chun estimated by the authorities to have imported over 700 tonnes of opium into Hong Kong between 1968 and 1974.

In the mid-1970s, an organized crime gang headed by Roland Tan and composed mainly of Singaporean Chinese traffickers known as the Ah Kong took control of the European heroin trade by smuggling heroin using couriers via airplane from Thailand and Malaysia to their headquarters in Amsterdam, where it was then distributed to other major cities in western Europe. So successful were the gang that they muscled in on and ultimately took over the European territory of the 14K and Wo Shing Wo groups of triads.

Heroin from Southeast Asia was originally brought to the United States by couriers, typically Thai and U.S. nationals, travelling on commercial airlines. Despite its strict drug laws, Singapore was often used as a transit point, as traffickers believed foreign law enforcement agencies would be less stringent in checking passengers on arrival if their flight departed from Singapore. California and Hawaii were the primary U.S. entry points for Golden Triangle heroin, but small percentages of the drug were also trafficked into New York City and Washington, D.C. While Southeast Asian groups had success in trafficking heroin to the United States, they initially had difficulty arranging street level distribution. However, with the incarceration of Asian traffickers in American prisons during the 1970s, contacts between Asian and American prisoners developed. These contacts have allowed Southeast Asian traffickers access to gangs and organizations distributing heroin at the retail level.

=== 1980s ===
In the 1980s, after traditional American Mafia groups were substantially weakened by a series of Mafia Commission Trials, ethnic Chinese traffickers gradually took over the dominant role in the heroin supply on the East Coast of the United States. A Drug Enforcement Administration study identified the source of the heroin sold on the streets of New York: from 1982 to 1987, the percentage of Southeast Asian heroin rose from 3 percent to more than 40 percent of the market supply. As demand grew, Asian criminal organizations began trafficking large shipments of high purity heroin hidden amongst legitimate seaborne cargo to the United States of America. Notable incidents included:

- The February 1988 seizure of 1,280 kilograms of 97% pure heroin hidden in bales of rubber sheets on a New York City bound freighter at Khlong Toei Port in Bangkok, with an estimated street price of $2 billion, was the world's largest single heroin seizure at the time.
- In February 1989, a U.S. record amount was seized when FBI agents in New York City raided a warehouse and discovered 380 kilograms of uncut heroin (with an estimated street price of $1 billion) hidden in wheelbarrow tires, which authorities believed were shipped from Hong Kong to Los Angeles before being trucked to the New York area.
- In early September 1989, the largest heroin seizure in the history of British Hong Kong occurred when narcotics agents raided an apartment in the Sai Kung District of the New Territories and discovered 420 kilograms of 99% pure heroin, worth an estimated $420 million, packed into 30 travel bags. The drugs were believed to have originated in Thailand before being smuggled by sea to Hong Kong, where they were then transferred to a local fishing junk and afterwards brought to shore via speedboat. Police believed the haul was ultimately destined for the United States or Australia
- A new U.S. record was achieved in June 1991 when authorities seized 545 kilograms of high quality heroin (with an estimated street price of $3 billion) concealed in boxes of plastic bags from a warehouse in Hayward, California. The shipment was originally smuggled from Thailand to the port of Kaohsiung in Taiwan within two shipping containers, then placed aboard a ship and brought to the Port of Oakland.

=== 1990s ===
Although Nigeria had traditionally been used by foreign organized crime groups as a transit point for narcotics and as a source of drug mules, by the early 1990s West African criminal organizations had themselves emerged as major traffickers of Southeast Asian heroin, with 660 West Africans being arrested in the United States for heroin trafficking in the year 1991. The issue became so widespread that in 1992 the Nigerian government enacted a law that required its citizens to first obtain an official Clearance Certificate to prove they have no previous convictions for any drug-related offences issued by the National Drug Law Enforcement Agency before they could apply for a Thailand travel visa. Instead of attempting to smuggle a single large shipment, Nigerian traffickers would typically recruit many low level non-Nigerian couriers to transport a couple of kilograms of heroin at a time via regular airline routes from transshipment points in Asia, such as Singapore, to western Europe or the eastern United States. Once the heroin arrived at its final destination, it was transported to cutting and packaging mills where it was diluted and packaged for retail or street-level sale, with the profits then transferred to Lagos or Hong Kong for the purposes of money laundering.

In September 1991, American federal agents arrested 37 people (including 28 Nigerian citizens) in the eastern United States as the result of a D.E.A. 18 month undercover investigation into a Nigerian led international drug trafficking gang that smuggled an estimated $200 million worth of heroin to America via Singapore using drug mules, with defendants facing federal indictments relating to drug conspiracy & distribution, racketeering and money-laundering. Earlier on the same day, Dutch national Johannes van Damme, who was employed by the same gang as a drug courier, was arrested in the transit lounge of Singapore Changi Airport and found to be in possession of 5.79 kilograms (12.8 lb) of high quality heroin hidden within two secret compartments of his suitcase. In a separate case in October 1996, U.S. law enforcement officials arrested members of a Chicago based Nigerian trafficking group that smuggled heroin from Thailand via couriers for distribution to cities across the American Midwest, that was believed to have supplied over 200 kg (440 lb) with an estimated retail price of $100 million a year to various street gangs in the region.

== Present day drug trafficking ==
Poppy cultivation in the country decreased more than 80 percent from 1998 to 2006 following an eradication campaign in the Golden Triangle. Officials with the United Nations Office of Drugs and Crime have confirmed that opium poppy farming has decreased since 2014, as synthetic drug production has expanded. The Golden Triangle is now one of the world's leading areas for the production of synthetic drugs and particularly methamphetamine as production has scaled up of Yaba tablets and crystalline methamphetamine, including for export to Australia, New Zealand, and across East and Southeast Asia. With respect to the accelerating synthetic drug production in the region, and specifically in Shan State, Myanmar, Sam Gor, also known as "The Company", is understood to be one of the main international crime syndicates responsible for this shift. Made up of members of five different triads and understood to be headed by Tse Chi Lop, a Canadian gangster born in Guangzhou, China, the Cantonese Chinese syndicate is primarily involved in drug trafficking, potentially earning up to $8 billion per year. Sam Gor is alleged to control 40% of the Asia-Pacific methamphetamine market, while also trafficking heroin and ketamine. The organization is active in a variety of countries in addition to Myanmar, including Thailand, Lao PDR, New Zealand, Australia, Japan, China and Taiwan.

The Chinese Muslim Panthay are the same ethnic group as the Muslims among the Chinese Chin Haw. A Panthay from Burma, Ma Zhengwen, assisted the Han Chinese drug lord Khun Sa in selling his heroin in north Thailand. The Panthay monopolized opium trafficking in Burma. They also created secret drug routes to reach the international market with contacts to smuggle drugs from Burma via south China.

In 2023, Myanmar overtook Afghanistan as the world's biggest producer of opium, after a ban on poppy cultivation by the Taliban reduced opium production by approximately 95%. A United Nations Office on Drugs and Crime report estimated that 1,080 metric tonnes of opium was produced in Myanmar, up from 790 metric tonnes the previous year and that countries' highest total since 2001, while opium production in Afghanistan was vastly reduced to an estimated 330 tonnes for the same twelve month time period. Due to the implementation of more efficient farming practices (such as the use of irrigation systems and fertilizers), yields in Myanmar have increased to approximately 23 kilogrammes per hectare of poppy field and farmers are now paid an average of US$355 per kilogram of raw opium (an increase of 27%), the report added.

Although a 2024 report from the United Nations Office on Drugs and Crime noted an 8 percent decrease in production, with an estimated 995 metric tons of opium produced over the previous 12 months, Myanmar remained the world's top producer of opium. The report also noted that yields had decreased to 22 kilogrammes per hectare of poppy field and farmers were being paid around US$300 per kilogram of raw opium over the same time period. In addition, somewhere between 52 and 140 tons of heroin, with an estimated value of between US$468 million and US$1.26 billion (US$9,000 per kilogram), was exported to other countries. A 2025 report from the same organization detailed a year-on-year increase in cultivation area of 17 percent, yielding an estimated 1,010 metric tons of opium and between 65 to 116 tons of heroin, with an estimated value between US$525 million and US$935 million (US$6,000 per kilogram), was potentially exported to other countries.

== Methamphetamine production and trafficking ==
"The Golden Triangle, and specifically Shan State of Myanmar, is believed to be the largest methamphetamine producing area in the world (modest sized geographic area with highly concentrated production)." The growing signs of an intensification of methamphetamine manufacturing activity within and around the Golden Triangle, and a corresponding decrease in the number of production facilities dismantled in other parts of the region, suggests that methamphetamine manufacture in East and Southeast Asia is now consolidated into the lower Mekong region. Countries in East and Southeast Asia have collectively witnessed sustained increases in seizures of methamphetamine over the last decade, totalling over 171 tons and a record of over 1 billion methamphetamine tablets in 2021 according to the United Nations Office on Drugs and Crime, more than any other part of the world. In April and May 2020, Myanmar authorities reported Asia's largest ever drug operation in Shan State totalling what was believed to be 193 million methamphetamine tablets, hundreds of kilogrammes of crystal methamphetamine as well as some heroin, and over 162,000 litres and 35.5 tons of drug precursors as well as sophisticated production equipment and several staging and storage facilities.

A 2025 United Nations Office on Drugs and Crime report detailed a record 236 tons of methamphetamine was seized by authorities in East and Southeast Asia the previous year, most of which originated from the Shan State. The UNODC blamed the ongoing instability in Myanmar for creating conditions to allow illicit methamphetamine synthesis and trafficking to increase, such as non-state armed groups ramping up production to raise funds and law enforcement responses being prevented in rebel held territory. Examples of increased trafficking activity include the May 2025 Indonesian National Narcotics Agency record seizure of 2 tons of crystal methamphetamine from a fishing boat off the Riau Islands, after a tip off from Thai law enforcement officials. Also, on 23 June 2025 the Royal Thai Police seized 2.4 tons of crystal methamphetamine from a tourist boat in Rayong province just before it was about to be smuggled out of the country. Thai authorities estimated the entire haul to have a wholesale value of US$9.15 million, but would be worth over US$90 million if it had successfully reached its destination (wholesale $US3,800 per kilogram / retail $US37,500 per kilogram).

== See also ==
- Allegations of CIA drug trafficking
- Golden Crescent
- Khun Sa
- Vang Pao
