= Mae Sai (disambiguation) =

Mae Sai is home to the district headquarters of Mae Sai District in the top of Chiang Rai province, Thailand.

Mae Sai may also refer to:

- Mae Sai District, Chiang Rai province, northernmost district of Thailand
- Mae Sai Subdistrict, subdistrict of Mae Sai District
- Mae Sai River
- Mae Sai, Phayao, subdistrict of Mueang Phayao district, Phayao province, Thailand
