= Tham Luang Nang Non =

Cave in Chiang Rai province, Thailand

- Tham Luang; Tham Nam Cham; Tham Yai
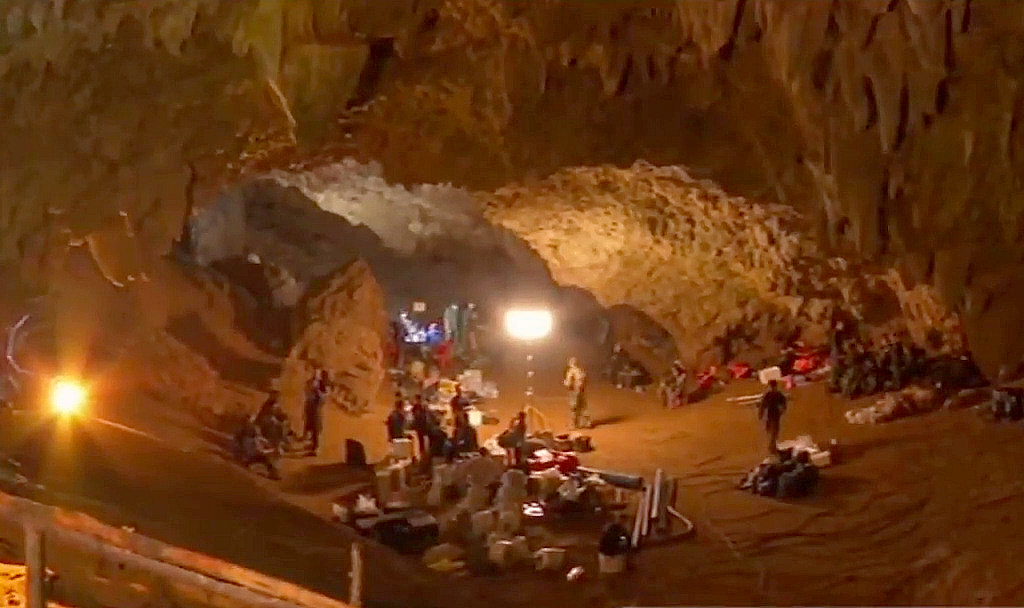
- Cave entrance in 2018

- Location within Thailand
- Location: Tham Luang–Khun Nam Nang Non Forest Park, Mae Sai, Chiang Rai Province, Thailand
- Coordinates: 20°22′54″N 99°52′06″E
- Depth: 85 metres (279 ft)
- Length: 10.3 kilometres (6.4 mi)
- Elevation: 446 metres (1,463 ft)
- Geology: Karst cave
- Hazards: Monsoon flooding
- Access: Tours available (November – April)
- Lighting: None (before the rescue operation)

Tham Luang Nang Non (Thai: ถ้ำหลวงนางนอน, lit. 'Great Cave of the Sleeping Lady', RTGS: Tham Luang Nang Non, pronounced [tʰâm lǔaŋ nāːŋ nɔ̄ːn]), also known as Tham Luang or Tham Yai, is a karstic cave system in the Tham Luang–Khun Nam Nang Non Forest Park, near the village of Ban Chong in Pong Pha subdistrict, in northern Thailand. It lies beneath Doi Nang Non, a mountain range on the border with Myanmar.

Previously known only to locals, Tham Luang Cave came to global attention when twelve members of a junior association football team and their assistant coach were found alive deep inside the cave on 2 July 2018 after they were trapped by monsoonal flooding on 23 June. A rescue mission brought everyone out safely by 10 July. Two Thai rescue divers died during the mission.

Tham Luang is the fourth largest cave in Thailand, stretching through a series of winding halls, low ceilings, rock collapses, and deep recesses with stalactites, stalagmites, and reflective stone surfaces. It is open to guided tours from November to April, though many parts remain inaccessible.

External images
- Map, from above, of the Tham Luang cave system, provided by BBC News
- Map, side view, of the Tham Luang cave system, provided by Deutsche Welle

== Geography ==
Tham Luang Nang Non is a prominent cave system located in Mae Sai District, Chiang Rai Province, Thailand. Situated under the Doi Nang Non mountain range, this natural landmark forms part of the border between Thailand and Myanmar. The cave, which extends for approximately 10.3 kilometers (6.4 miles), is the fourth largest in Thailand and features a complex layout of twisting paths, narrow passages, and expansive chambers.

The entrance of the cave is at an altitude of 446 meters above sea level, while the mountain itself rises to a peak of 1,389 meters. The terrain of the cave system includes flooded tunnels, rocky elevations, and maze-like corridors, making navigation challenging. The cave is shaped by the interplay of granite and limestone formations, with the west side of the mountain prominently showcasing where these geological elements converge.

Above the cave, the Doi Nang Non mountain range, often shrouded in clouds, is rich with vegetation. Teak, Burma padauk, and bamboo trees line the streams flowing through the surrounding forest, creating a cool and shaded environment. The mountain's silhouette resembles a reclining woman, giving the cave its name, which translates to "the big cave and water source of the sleeping lady mountain."

Tham Luang, located in northern Thailand, is a limestone cave system featuring various rock formations, including stalactites and stalagmites, shaped by long-term groundwater erosion. The cave is part of the Doi Nang Non karst landscape. It is characterized by a network of narrow passages and tunnels, with parts of the system subject to seasonal flooding.

A visitor center outside the main entrance provides a detailed map of the cave, and there is a car park nearby. The first 1 kilometer (0.6 mi) of the cave is open to the public for guided tours between November and April. However, the cave floods during the rainy season and is closed to visitors during that time. This makes Tham Luang a popular destination during the dry season while preserving its natural state during the monsoon.

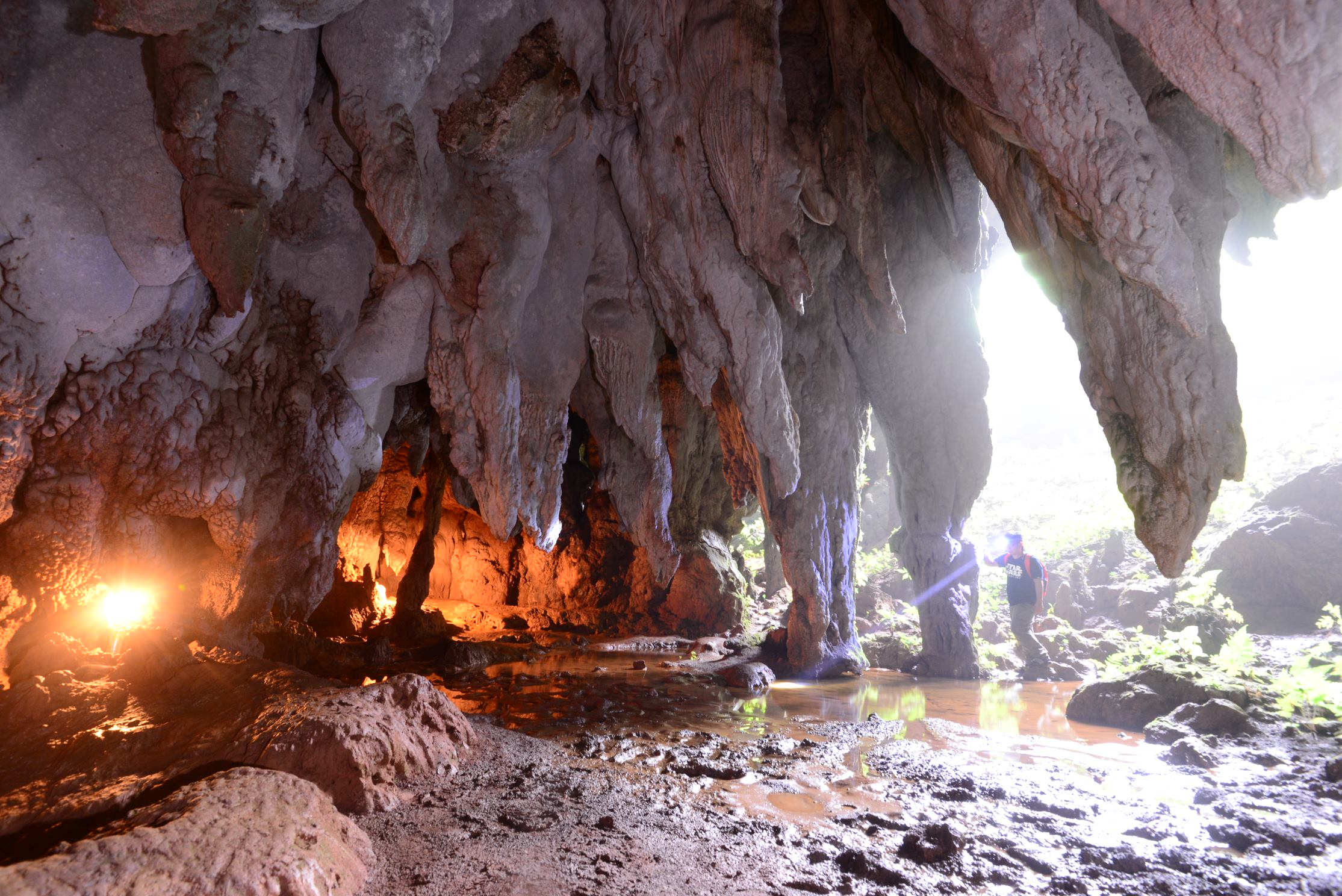

== Climate ==
Tham Luang Nang Non is a seasonal cave system significantly impacted by the regional climate. The cave is open for exploration during the dry months, typically from November to April. However, the rainy season, starting in July, brings heavy monsoon rains that make the cave unsafe for visitors.

During this period, rainwater from the Doi Nang Non mountain range floods the cave system, with water levels rising up to 5 meters in some areas. This influx of water fills the interconnected tunnels and chambers, making navigation impossible. The saturated mountain channels water directly into the cave system, further contributing to the flooding.

To ensure safety, authorities close the cave during the rainy season. Visitors are advised to plan trips during the dry season when conditions are more stable.

== Fauna ==
Tham Luang Nang Non is home to a delicate ecosystem that includes numerous endemic species, many of which cannot be found elsewhere. The cave's unique environment supports diverse fauna, including various bats, invertebrates, and fish that thrive in its permanent streams. Environmentalists caution against drastic changes to the cave, as even minor disturbances can lead to irreversible damage and the potential extinction of these specialized species, highlighting the need for careful conservation efforts in this fragile habitat.

== History ==
The cave system is situated beneath the Doi Nang Non-Mountain range, which translates to "Mountain of the Sleeping Lady." This name is derived from local legends that tell of a beautiful princess who fell in love with a commoner. According to one version of the tale, after fleeing from her father's wrath, she took refuge in the cave. Tragically, her lover was killed by soldiers sent by her father, leading her to take her own life. Her blood is said to have formed the Mae Sai River, while her body became the mountain itself. This legend has deep cultural significance for the local Tai Yai ethnic group and reflects their spiritual connection to the land and its natural features

=== 1986 Protected Area ===
In 1986, a portion of the Doi Nang Non range was designated as Tham Luang–Khun Nam Nang Non-Forest Park. This designation aimed to protect the unique karst landscape and its biodiversity while promoting sustainable tourism. Despite its natural beauty and ecological importance, the area remained relatively unknown to tourists until a significant event in 2018 brought it international attention.

=== 2018 Cave Rescue ===
In 2018, twelve boys aged 11 to 16, all members of a junior association football team, and their 25-year-old male assistant coach were stranded in the cave for 18 days by a flood. They were rescued in a massive joint operation between the Thai government, the Thai military, and a group of international expert cave divers. British divers found them on a muddy ledge in darkness more than 4 kilometres (2.5 mi) from the entrance nine days into their ordeal. The effort to save their lives was a global operation watched around the world. In all, 90 divers – 50 of whom were foreigners – helped to extract the group. An ex-navy diver, Saman Kunan, died during the mission because he ran out of air, having placed air tanks along the route for the boys. Another diver and ex-Navy Seal, Beirut Pakbara, died the next year from a septic shock from an unspecified blood infection he contracted during the cave rescue.

== See also ==
- DNP - Tham Luang-Khun Nam Nang Non National Park
- Tourism Thailand
