= Bandi =

Bandi may refer to:

== People with the name ==
- Bandi (writer), North Korean fiction writer, born 1950
- Bandi Rajan Babu (1938–2011), Indian photographer
- Bandi Yadagiri, Indian revolutionary poet
- Damdinjavyn Bandi (1942–2018), Mongolian boxer
- Giovanni Carlo Bandi (1709–1784), Italian bishop and cardinal
- Philipp Bandi (born 1977), Swiss track and field athlete

== Other uses ==
- Gbandi (or Bandi), people of Liberia and Guinea
  - Gbandi language (or Bandi), a Mande language spoken by that people
- Bandi River, a tributary of the Luni River
- Bandi (jacket), a vest-jacket worn in South Asia
- Bandi (Star Trek), a fictional race in Star Trek

== See also ==
- Bandai (disambiguation)
- Bandhi, a town of Shaheed Benazir Abad District of Sindh, Pakistan
- Bandy (disambiguation)
