= Bendi =

Bendi may refer to:

- Translift Bendi Articulated Forklift Trucks
- Bendi languages in the Congo-Nigeria region
- Bendi people of Ituri, in western Africa
- Punti, the Cantonese-speaking populations of Guangdong province in southern China
- Avre Bendi, a Konkani recipe in India
- Bendi-Bus, or Bi-articulated bus in Germany

== See also ==
- Bandy (disambiguation)
