= Huai Khrai =

Coordinates: 20°16′N 99°51′E

Huai Khrai ห้วยไคร้
- Tambon
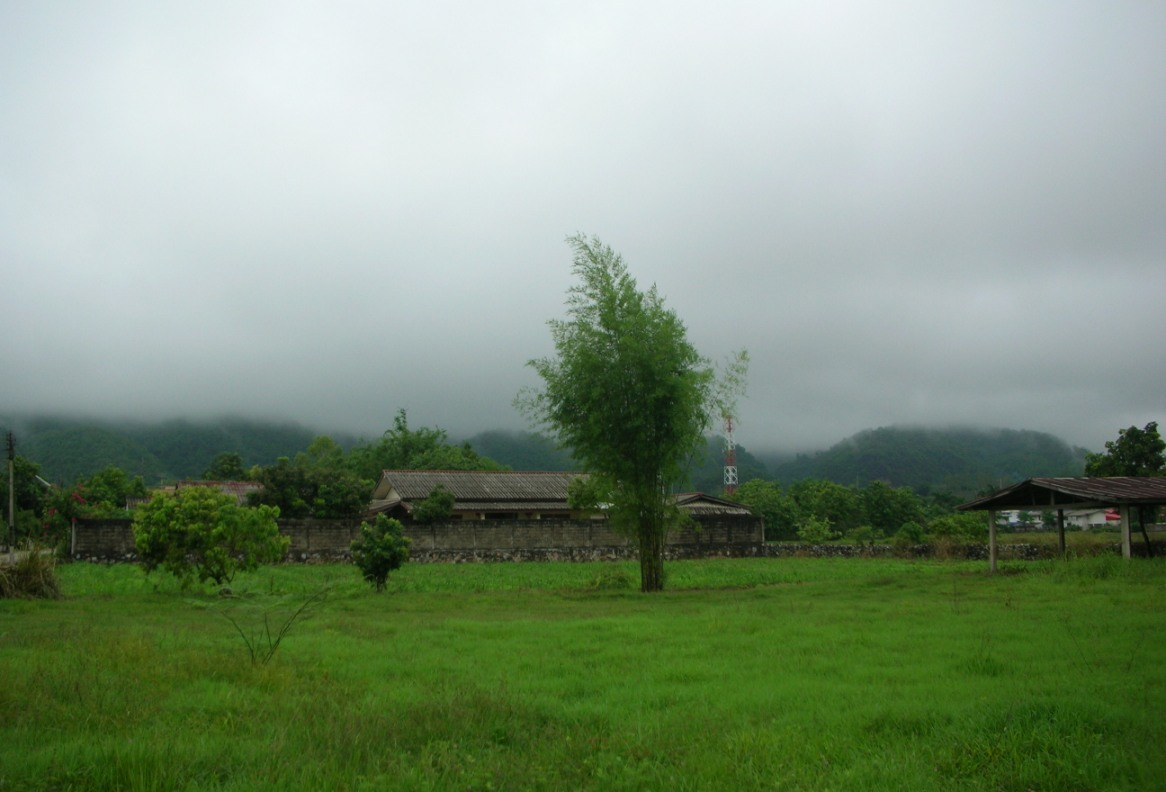
- Doi Nang Non, Huai Khrai
- Interactive map of Huai Khrai
- Country: Thailand
- Province: Chiang Rai
- District: Mae Sai

Population (2005)
  - Total: 7,609
- Time zone: UTC+7 (ICT)

Huai Khrai (Thai: ห้วยไคร้, pronounced [hûaj.kʰráj]; Northern Thai language: pronounced [hűaj.xáj]) is a village and tambon (subdistrict) of Mae Sai District, in Chiang Rai Province, Thailand. In 2005, it had a population of 7,609 people. The tambon contains 11 villages.
