= Pong Ngam =

Pong Ngam โป่งงาม
- Tambon
- Interactive map of Pong Ngam
- Coordinates: 20°18′39″N 99°52′48″E
- Country: Thailand
- Province: Chiang Rai
- Amphoe: Mae Sai

Population (2021)
  - Total: 12,367
- Time zone: UTC+7 (TST)
- Postal code: 57130
- TIS 1099: 570909

Pong Ngam (Thai: โป่งงาม) is a tambon (subdistrict) of Mae Sai District, in Chiang Rai Province, Thailand. In 2021 it had a total population of 12,367 people.

== History ==
The subdistrict was created effective June 19, 1990 by splitting off 11 administrative villages from Pong Pha.

== Administration ==
=== Central administration ===
The tambon is subdivided into 12 administrative villages (muban).

No.	Name	Thai
1.	Ban Tham	บ้านถ้ำ
2.	Ban Dong	บ้านดง
3.	Ban Tham Pla	บ้านถ้ำปลา
4.	Ban Tham Mai	บ้านถ้ำใหม่
5.	Ban Huai Pu Kaeng	บ้านห้วยปูแกง
6.	Ban San Kosa	บ้านสันกอสา
7.	Ban San Kret Thong	บ้านสันเกร็ดทอง
8.	Ban Pong Nuea	บ้านโป่งเหนือ
9.	Ban Pong	บ้านโป่ง
10.	Ban Phahi	บ้านผาฮี้
11.	Ban Mu Soe Phahi	บ้านมูเซอร์ผาฮี้
12.	Ban Tham Phatthana	บ้านถ้ำพัฒนา

=== Local administration ===
The whole area of the subdistrict is covered by the subdistrict administrative organization (SAO) Pong Ngam (องค์การบริหารส่วนตำบลโป่งงาม).
