= Ko Chang (disambiguation) =

Ko Chang may refer to:

- Ko Chang District, in Trat Province, Thailand's third largest island
- Ko Chang, Mae Sai, a subdistrict in Chiang Rai Province, Thailand
- Ko Chang (Ranong), a small island in Ranong Province, Thailand

== See also ==
- Geochang County, also known as Kochang, a county in South Gyeongsang, South Korea
- USS Mockingbird (AMS-27), also known as ROKS Ko Chang (MSC-521), a YMS-1-class minesweeper of the United States Navy
