= Bandai (disambiguation) =

Bandai is a Japanese toy manufacturer.

Bandai may also refer to:

- Bandai, Fukushima, a town in Fukushima Prefecture, Japan
- Mount Bandai, in Fukushima Prefecture, Japan
- Bandai Visual, a Japanese anime company

== See also ==
- Ban Dai, village in Mae Sai District, Chiang Rai Province, Thailand
- Bandi (disambiguation)
