= Bandy (disambiguation) =

Bandy is a winter sport.

Bandy may also refer to:

- Bandy (carriage), a cart used in India and Sri Lanka
- Bandy (surname), a surname
- Bandy-bandy, a snake
- Bandy Creek, Western Australia, suburb in Australia
- Bandy Farms Historic District, United States
- Bandy Island, Antarctica
- Bandy, Virginia, an unincorporated community in the United States
- Dr. Robert W. Bandy House, historic house in the United States
- "Bandy legs" or "bandiness"; see genu varum

== See also ==
- Bandi (disambiguation)
- Band (disambiguation)
