= Si Mueang Chum =

Coordinates: 20°22′02″N 99°58′04″E

Si Mueang Chum ศรีเมืองชุม
- Tambon
- Interactive map of Si Mueang Chum
- Country: Thailand
- Province: Chiang Rai
- District: Mae Sai

Population (2005)
  - Total: 5,090
- Time zone: UTC+7 (ICT)

Si Mueang Chum (Thai: ศรีเมืองชุม) is a village and tambon (subdistrict) of Mae Sai District, in Chiang Rai Province, Thailand. In 2005 it had a population of 5,090 people. The tambon contains nine villages.
