= Mae Sai subdistrict =

Mae Sai แม่สาย
- Tambon
- Interactive map of Mae Sai
- Coordinates: 20°25′36″N 99°53′03″E
- Country: Thailand
- Province: Chiang Rai
- Amphoe: Mae Sai

Population (2020)
  - Total: 30,338
- Time zone: UTC+7 (TST)
- Postal code: 57130
- TIS 1099: 570901

Mae Sai (Thai: แม่สาย) is a tambon (subdistrict) of Mae Sai District, in Chiang Rai Province, Thailand. In 2020 it had a total population of 30,338 people.

== History ==
The subdistrict was created effective November 8, 1936 by splitting off 7 administrative villages from Pong Pha.

== Administration ==
=== Central administration ===
The tambon is subdivided into 13 administrative villages (muban).

No.	Name	Thai
1.	Ban Mueang Daeng Tai	บ้านเหมืองแดงใต้
2.	Ban Mueang Daeng	บ้านเหมืองแดง
3.	Ban San Phak Hi	บ้านสันผักฮี้
4.	Ban Wiang Hom	บ้านเวียงหอม
5.	Ban San Ma Na	บ้านสันมะนะ
6.	Ban Pa Yang	บ้านป่ายาง
7.	Ban Ko Sai	บ้านเกาะทราย
8.	Ban Pa Yang	บ้านป่ายาง
9.	Ban San Sai	บ้านสันทราย
10.	Ban Mai Lung Khon	บ้านไม้ลุงขน
11.	Ban San Sai Mai	บ้านสันทรายใหม่
12.	Ban Chin Ho Opphayop	บ้านจีนฮ่ออพยพ
13.	Ban Mueang Daeng Pi Yaphon	บ้านเหมืองแดงปิยะพร

=== Local administration ===
The area of the subdistrict is shared by 2 local governments.

- the subdistrict municipality (Thesaban Tambon) Mae Sai (เทศบาลตำบลแม่สาย)
- the subdistrict municipality (Thesaban Tambon) Mae Sai Mittraphap (เทศบาลตำบลแม่สายมิตรภาพ)
