= Bandy (surname) =

Bandy is a surname. Notable people with the surname include:

- Andi Muhammad Suryady Bandy (born 1981), Malaysian politician
- Daniel Bandy (born 1975), Australian rules footballer
- David Bandy (born 1978), Australian first-class cricketer
- Don Bandy (born 1945), former American football offensive lineman
- George Bandy (1945–2018), American politician
- Ina Bandy (1903–1973), humanist photographer
- Jett Bandy (born 1990), American MLB catcher
- Lou Bandy (Lodewijk Ferdinand Dieben) (1890–1959), Dutch singer
- Michael Bandy (born 1997), American football player
- Moe Bandy (born 1944), American country singer
- Orville Lee Bandy (1917–1973), American geologist
- Paul Bandy (born 1944), American politician
- Wallace A. Bandy (1880–1941), Illinois state representative and businessman
- Way Bandy (1941–1986), American makeup artist

== Fictional characters ==
- Bartholomew Wolfe Bandy, the hero of the novels The Bandy Papers

== See also ==
- Bandy, winter sport
