= Bandi Yadagiri =

Indian revolutionary poet

Bandi Yadagiri (born Venke Pally, Telangana) is an Indian revolutionary poet. He penned the song Bandi Enka Bandi Katti about the atrocities of 7th Nizam of Hyderabad, Mir Osman Ali Khan which was re-written for the movie Maa Bhoomi.

Yadagiri was an ordinary member of the Left Party from Nalgonda during the Telangana armed struggle.
