= Sai River (Thailand) =

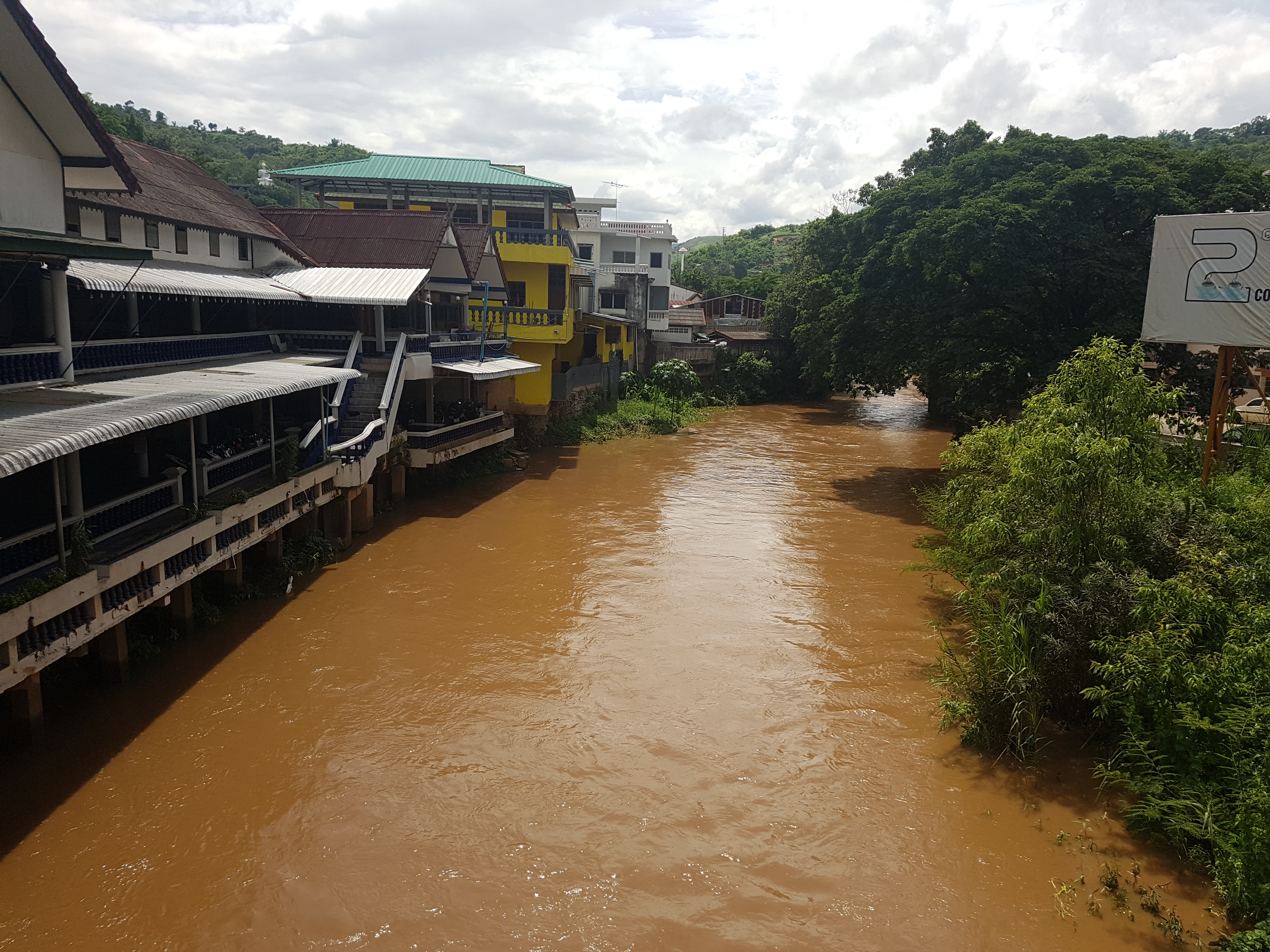
- View of the river in July 2017

Location
- Country: Myanmar and Thailand

Physical characteristics
- Source
  - location: Daen Lao Range, Shan Hills
- Mouth
  - location: Ruak River SE of Tachileik Airport
  - coordinates: 20°27′52″N 99°57′17″E
  - elevation: 380 m (1,250 ft)

Sai River (Thai: แม่สาย or แม่น้ำสาย; RTGS: Mae Sai or Maenam Sai; Thai pronunciation: [mɛ̂ː.sǎːj / mɛ̂ː.náːm.sǎːj]), formerly known as the River of Lawa (Thai: แม่ละว้า; RTGS: Mae Lawa), is a river that forms the natural border between Thailand and Myanmar at Tachileik and Mae Sai Districts. Mae Sai town, where the bridge crossing the international border is located, is named after this river. It is a tributary of the Ruak River, itself a tributary of the Mekong.

== Course ==
The river has its sources in the Daen Lao Range, in Shan State, Myanmar. Then it flows southeastwards, bending eastwards at the feet of the northern end of the Doi Nang Non ridge before flowing through the Tachileik/Mae Sai urban area, where there is a sign marking the northernmost point of Thailand just east of the border-crossing bridge —at the meeting point of Thailand Route 1 and National Highway 4 (Burma)— over the river. Finally it flows northeastwards before joining the right side of the Ruak River, a tributary of the Mekong, less than 3 kilometres (2 mi) southeast of Tachileik Airport.
