= Ban Dai =

Coordinates: 20°17′29″N 99°56′47″E

- Tambon
- Interactive map of Ban Dai
- Country: Thailand
- Province: Chiang Rai
- District: Mae Sai

Population (2005)
  - Total: 4,117
- Time zone: UTC+7 (ICT)

Ban Dai (Thai: ?) is a village and tambon (sub-district) of Mae Sai District, in Chiang Rai Province, Thailand. In 2005 it had a population of 4,117 people. The tambon contains eight villages.
