= Ko Chang, Chiang Rai =

Coordinates: 20°26′N 99°58′E

Ko Chang, Chiang Rai เกาะช้าง
- Tambon
- Interactive map of Ko Chang, Chiang Rai
- Country: Thailand
- Province: Chiang Rai
- District: Mae Sai

Population (2005)
  - Total: 9,964
- Time zone: UTC+7 (ICT)

Ko Chang, Chiang Rai (Thai: เกาะช้าง) is a village and tambon (sub-district) of Mae Sai District, in Chiang Rai Province, Thailand. In 2005, it had a population of 9,964 people. The tambon contains 13 villages.
