= Doi Nang Non =

Mountain range of the Thai highlands located in Chiang Rai Province, Thailand

Doi Nang Non ดอยนางนอน
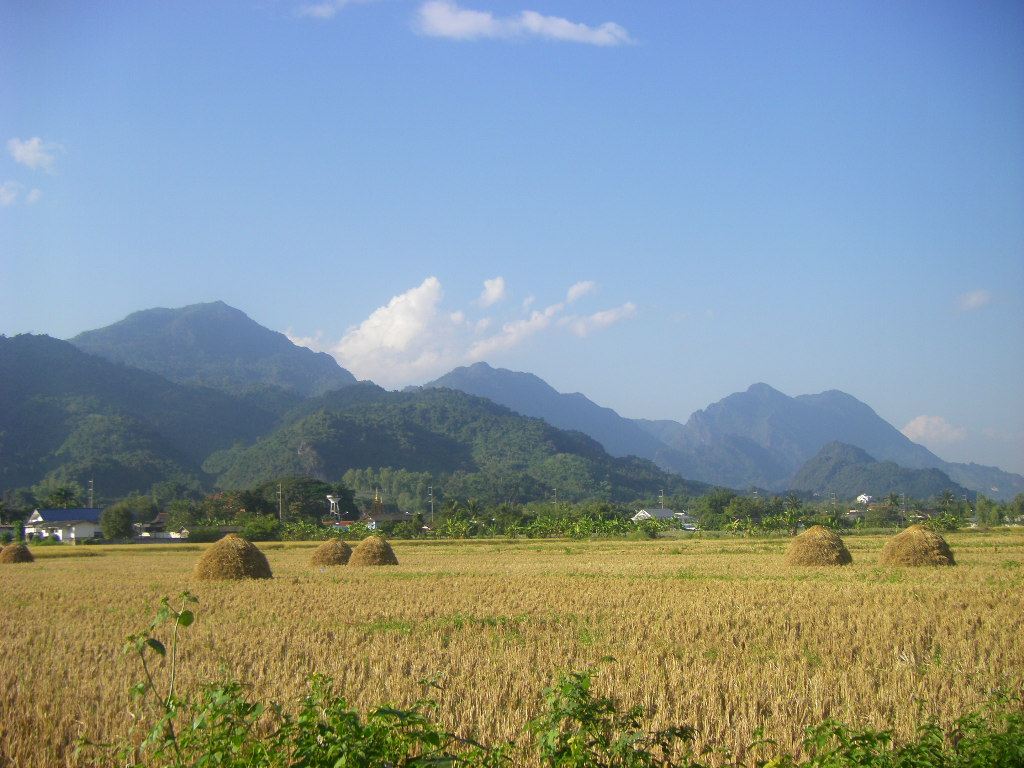
- The Doi Nang Non mountain range. When viewed from this angle, it is said to resemble a lady lying on her back.

Highest point
- Peak: Doi Tung
- Elevation: 1,389 m (4,557 ft)
- Listing: List of mountain ranges in the world named The Sleeping Lady
- Coordinates: 20°21′06″N 99°50′30″E

Dimensions
- Length: 30 km (19 mi) NNE/SSW
- Width: 7 km (4.3 mi) WNW/ESE

Geography
- Location within Thailand
- Location: Mae Sai District, Chiang Rai Province, Thailand
- Parent range: Daen Lao Range

Geology
- Rock type: Limestone

Climbing
- Easiest route: From Mae Sai or Mae Chan

Doi Nang Non (Thai: ดอยนางนอน, pronounced [dɔ̄ːj nāːŋ nɔ̄ːn]; 'Mountain of the Sleeping Lady') is a mountain range in the Thai highlands in Chiang Rai Province, Thailand. It is a karstic formation with numerous waterfalls and caves rising at the southern end of the Daen Lao Range. Part of its area is managed as the Tham Luang–Khun Nam Nang Non Forest Park (Thai: วนอุทยานถ้ำหลวง-ขุนน้ำนางนอน).

== Geography ==
Doi Nang Non consists of a long hill tract that lies on the west side of the highway between Chiang Rai and Mae Sai. The greater part of the range is in Mae Sai District, extending west and southwest of Pong Pha along the border with Myanmar. The mountain range is an unusual land feature when seen from certain angles as its silhouette takes the shape of a reclining woman with long hair. Its highest point is Doi Tung, which corresponds to the belly of the lady.

=== Caves ===
There are a number of caves and underground water courses in the range area.

- Tham Luang Nang Non (Thai: ถ้ำหลวงนางนอน; 'Great Cave of the Sleeping Lady') is a semi-dry (Note: The cave is mostly dry throughout most of the year, but fills with water during the rainy season.) limestone cave in the Doi Nang Non range. It is 10.3 kilometres (6.4 mi) long, and has many deep recesses, narrow passages and tunnels winding under hundreds of meters of limestone strata. There are numerous stalactites and stalagmites in some parts of the system. In 2018, Tham Luang was the site of a rescue operation to find and evacuate a local junior football team trapped inside. The cave was damaged during the operation. Authorities plan to rehabilitate the cave and its surrounding landscape, and have discussed plans of turning the area into a national park due to the increased tourist interest in it.
- Khun Nam Nang Non (Thai: ขุนน้ำนางนอน; 'Headwaters of the Sleeping Lady') is a natural pond into which water flows from the rocks above. This water is said to be the tears of the legendary lady's ghost.

== History ==
In 1986 an eight km^{2} sector of the range which included the entrance to the main cave was declared the Tham Luang–Khun Nam Nang Non Forest Park.

=== 2018 rescue operation ===
On 23 June 2018, a group of twelve boys aged between 11 and 16, who went to explore Tham Luang Nang Non with their assistant football coach, aged 25, went missing. The group was found 10 days later. They were part of a local junior football team. The cave they entered became flooded. Thai Navy SEAL divers had been searching the caves ever since. Owing to heavy rain which further flooded the cave entrance, searches were periodically interrupted. Thai NAVY divers soon got help from American, Australian, British, and Chinese divers, military members, and emergency personnel.

The group was found alive on Monday evening, 2 July, according to a press release at 22:30. All 12 boys along with their coach were reported alive. They were found by British volunteer divers around 400 metres away from a spot nicknamed "Pattaya Beach", an elevated mound in the cave. Food and medical supplies were delivered but a three-hour-long journey, continued rains and mountainous terrain above the cave delayed their escape. On 8 July at 19:00 four of the boys had been rescued. By 10 July at 19:00, all of the boys and their coach had been rescued from the cave.

== Legend ==
One of the legends goes that in ancient times a beautiful princess fell in love with a stable boy and became pregnant. Knowing their love was forbidden, they fled and went in the cave to rest. When the boy went in search of food, he was caught by the princess's father's army and killed. The distraught princess stabbed herself to death and the legend says her blood became the water that flows through the cave, while her body is the surrounding mountains, said to look like a sleeping woman.

== Tourism ==
Some of the caves in the hill area have been developed as a tourist attraction. There is a viewpoint at Mae Chan District, from where the "sleeping lady" can best be observed. Local tour guides joke that Doi Nang Non would be "the highest mountain in the world", if only the supposed lady would get up and stand on her feet.

== Location ==
Tham Luang–Khun Nam Nang Non National Park in overview PARO 15 (Chiang Rai)

8) Tham Luang–Khun Nam Nang Non National Park in overview PARO 15 (Chiang Rai)

	National park
1	Doi Luang
2	Doi Phu Nang
3	Khun Chae
4	Lam Nam Kok
5	Mae Puem
6	Phu Chi Fa
7	Phu Sang
8	Tham Luang– Khun Nam Nang Non
	Wildlife sanctuary
9	Doi Pha Chang
10	Wiang Lo

	Non-hunting area
11	Chiang Saen
12	Doi Insi
13	Don Sila
14	Khun Nam Yom
15	Mae Chan
16	Mae Tho
17	Nong Bong Khai
18	Nong Leng Sai
19	Thap Phaya Lo
20	Wiang Chiang Rung
21	Wiang Thoeng

	Forest park
22	Doi Hua Mae Kham
23	Huai Nam Chang
24	Huai Sai Man
25	Namtok Huai Mae Sak
26	Namtok Huai Tat Thong
27	Namtok Khun Nam Yab
28	Namtok Mae Salong
29	Namtok Nam Min
30	Namtok Si Chomphu
31	Namtok Tat Khwan
32	Namtok Tat Sairung
33	Namtok Tat Sawan
34	Namtok Wang Than Thong
35	Phaya Phiphak
36	Rong Kham Luang
37	San Pha Phaya Phrai
38	Tham Pha Lae

== See also ==
- Doi Tung
- Tham Luang cave rescue
- List of mountains in Thailand
- List of caves
- Speleology
