= Bandy Farms Historic District =

Historic district in North Carolina, United States

- U.S. National Register of Historic Places
- U.S. Historic district
- Location within North Carolina Location within the United States
- Location: East side of SR 1003, 0.5 miles (0.80 km)-0.85 miles (1.37 km) south of SR 1813 junction, near Bandy's Crossroads, North Carolina
- Coordinates: 35°37′51″N 81°05′35″W
- Area: 58.6 acres (23.7 ha)
- Built: 1884, 1887
- Built by: Moser, E.P.; Hunsucker, W.J.
- Architectural style: I-house
- MPS: Catawba County MPS
- NRHP reference No.: 90000663
- Added to NRHP: April 27, 1990

Bandy Farms Historic District, also known as the Theodore L. Bandy Farm and Joseph S. Bandy Farm, is a historic farm and national historic district located near Bandy's Crossroads, Catawba County, North Carolina. The district encompasses 3 contributing buildings. They are two nearly identical two-story brick farmhouses built in 1884 and 1887, and a one-story brick outbuilding.

It was added to the National Register of Historic Places in 1990.
