= Wallace A. Bandy =

American businessman and politician

Wallace Albert Bandy (June 19, 1880 – May 14, 1941) was an American businessman and politician.

Bandy was born on a farm in Sandy Hook, Kentucky and went to the public schools. He served in the United States Army during the Spanish–American War in the 4th Kentucky Infantry Regiment. He lived in Marion, Illinois and was in the real estate and insurance business. Bandy served in the Illinois House of Representatives from 1923 to 1931 and was a Republican. Bandy died at home in Marion, Illinois after having major surgery at Barnes Hospital in St. Louis, Missouri.
