= Bandi Rajan Babu =

Indian photographer (1938-2011)

- Born: 9 February 1938; Korutla, in the Karimnagar district of Telangana
- Died: 25 August 2011 (aged 73)
- Occupation: Photographer

Bandi Rajan Babu (9 February 1938 – 25 August 2011) was an Indian photographer. He is known for his black and white pictures of tribal people. He owned the Rajan School of Photography.

== Early life ==
Bandi Rajan Babu was born at Korutla, in the Karimnagar district (Jagtial district) of the Indian state of Telangana.

== Early life ==
Rajan took to serious photography in 1960 after joining the Jawaharlal Nehru Technological University.

Rajan Babu was all set to become a painter until given a Kodak camera. "One of my cousins presented me with a camera when I was in my seventh class and I casually clicked some photos that were appreciated by all, and that was the seeding of a photographer in me. Later, when I joined the five-year diploma course in commercial art, I came across Raja Triambak Raj Bahadur, a pioneer in pictorial photography. It was he who inspired me to wield the camera. And here I am today from a painter to a photographer."

== Career ==
He started as a lecturer at JNTU Fine Arts College. Later, he established his own school and mastered the craft of ‘pictorial photography'. He was a Fellow of the Royal Photographic Society of Great Britain, an Associate of the International Federation of Photographic Art, France, and an Honorary Fellow of the AP State Akademi of Photography.

He became a pictorial, fashion and glamour, industrial and advertising photographer. He drew inspiration from Raja Triambak Raj Bahadur, the first from former Andhra Pradesh to be honored with the status of Associate of Britain's Royal Photographic Society.

He later worked as a scientific photographer in International Crop Research Institute for Semi-Arid Tropics.

He opened his studio in 1978 and thereafter, was among India's leading photographers.

== Personal life ==
He married and had three kids. He has five grand children.

== Recognition ==
Rajan got his first international honor from Belgium, received the APRS honor in 1983, and followed it up with the Fellowship of the Royal Photographic Society in 1987. Apart from winning national and international awards, he is the only Fellow of Royal Photographic Society from AP.
