= Mae Sai =

Mae Sai แม่สาย
- Subdistrict Municipality
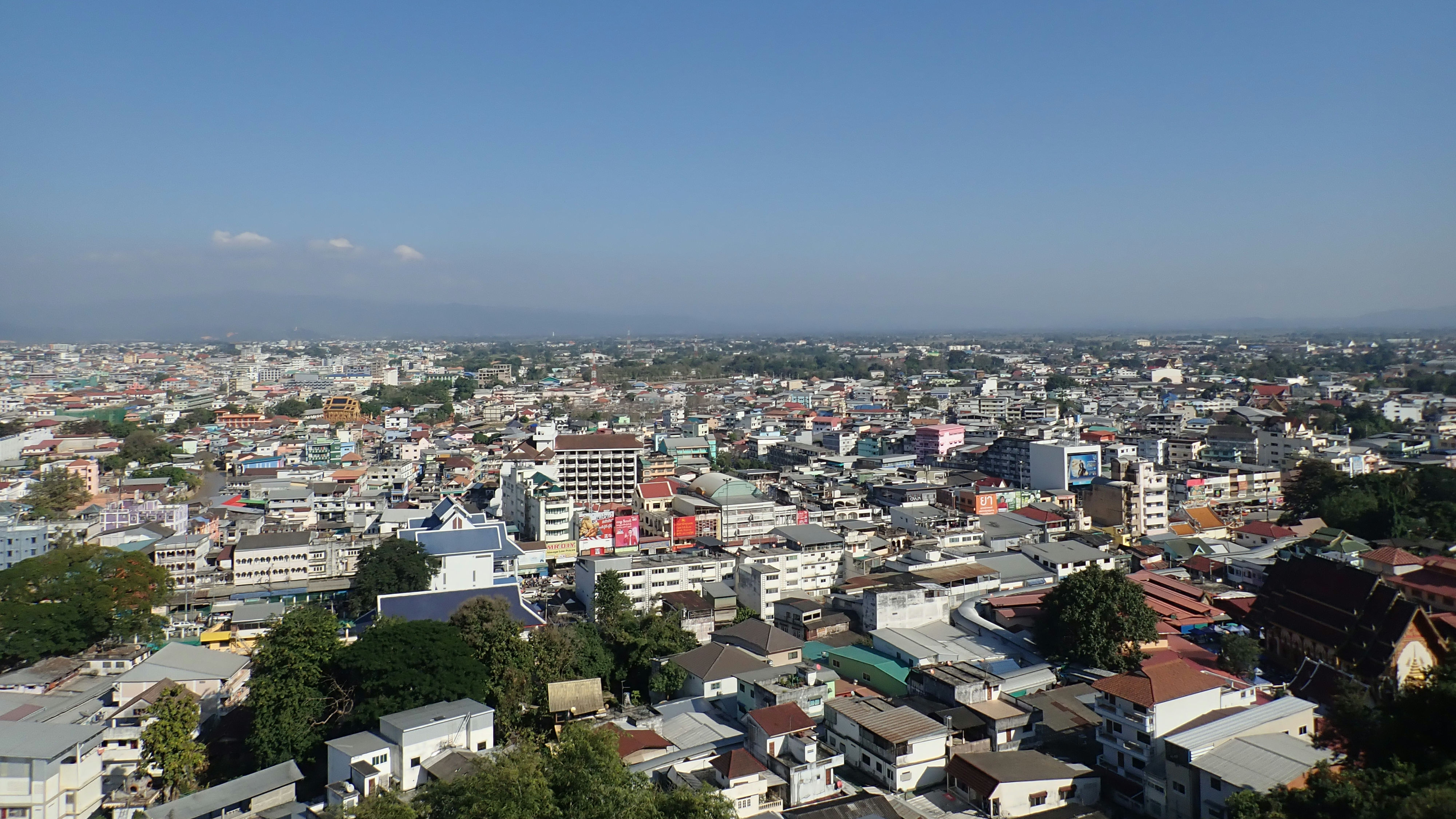
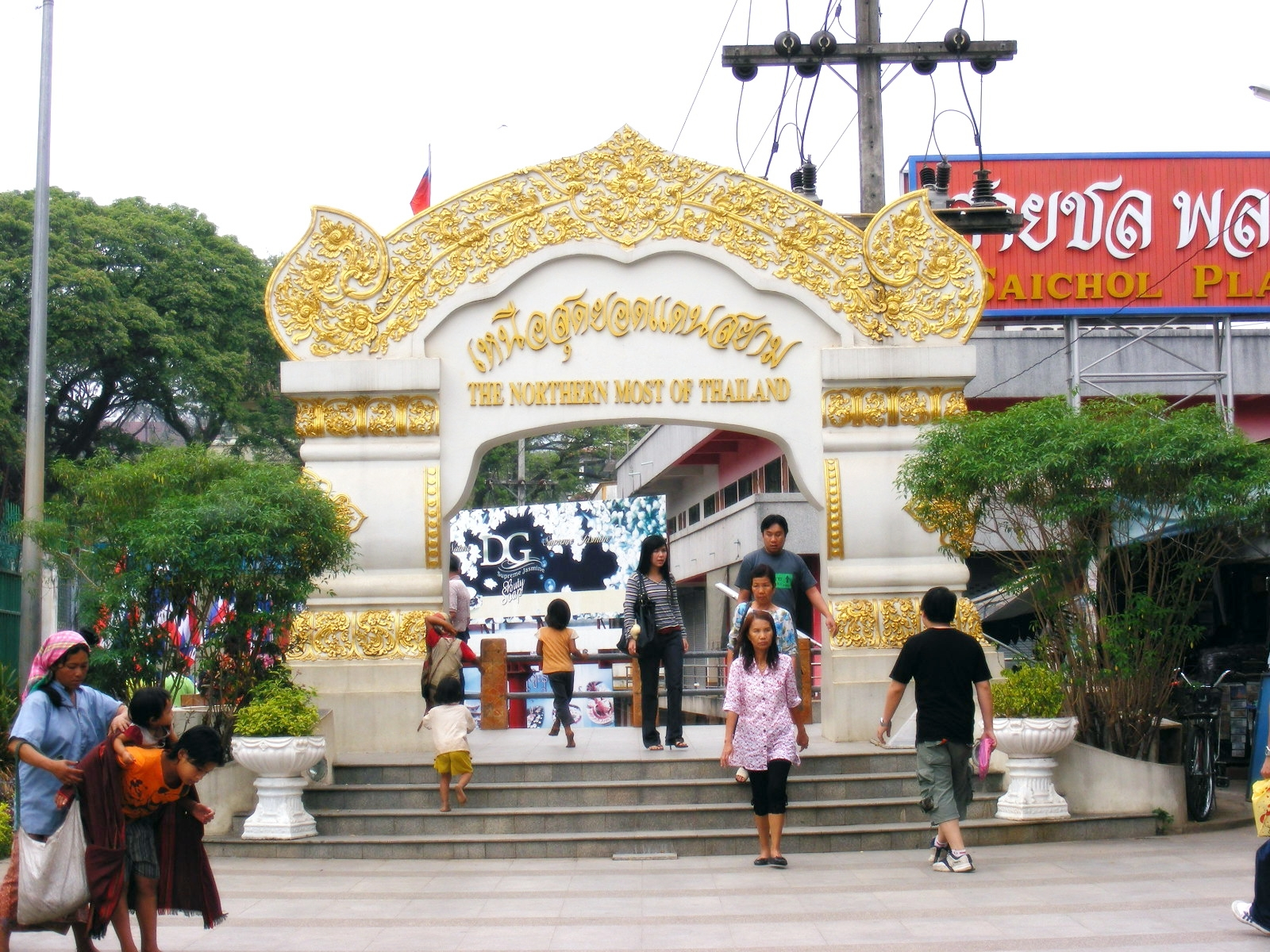
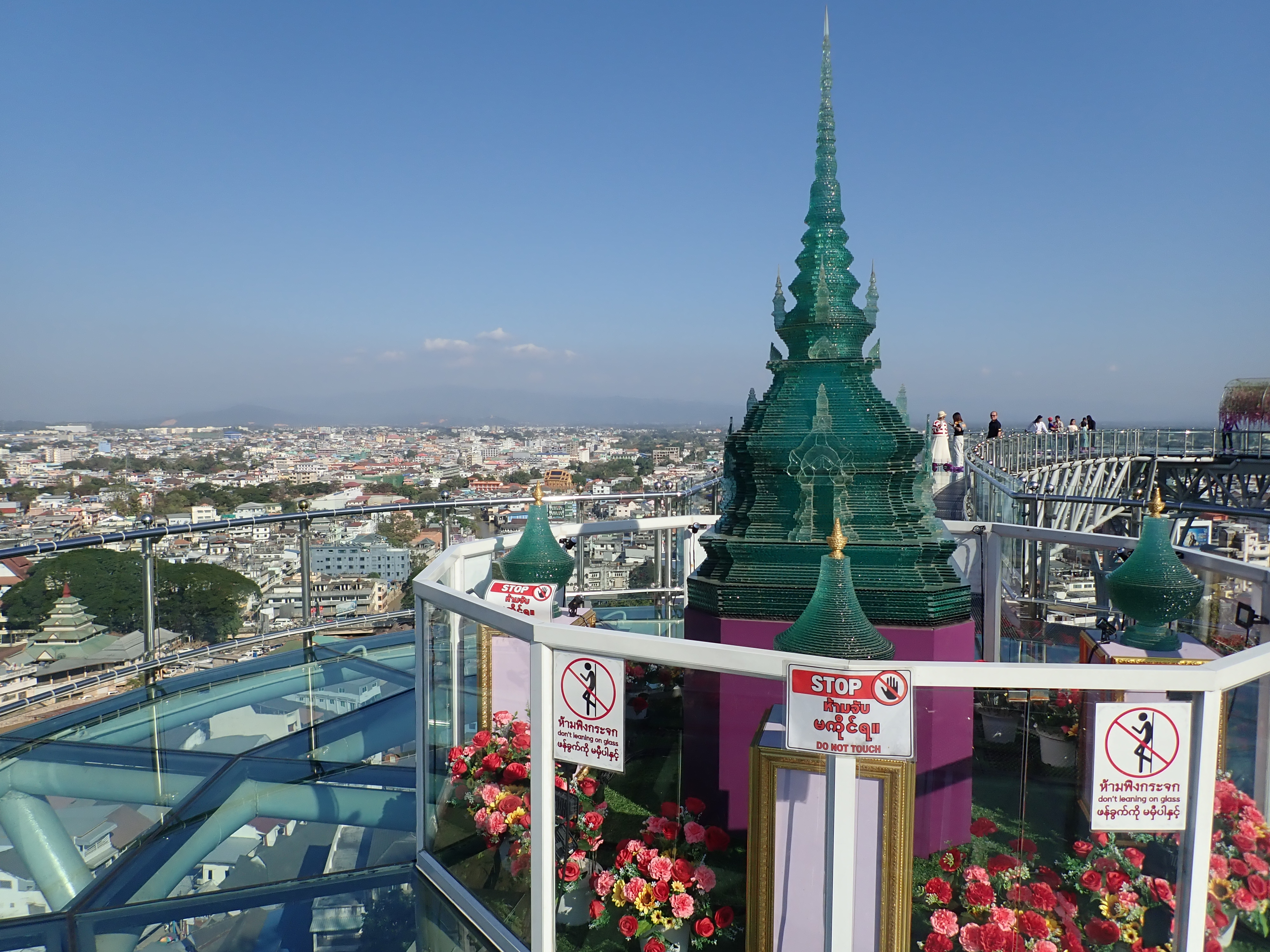
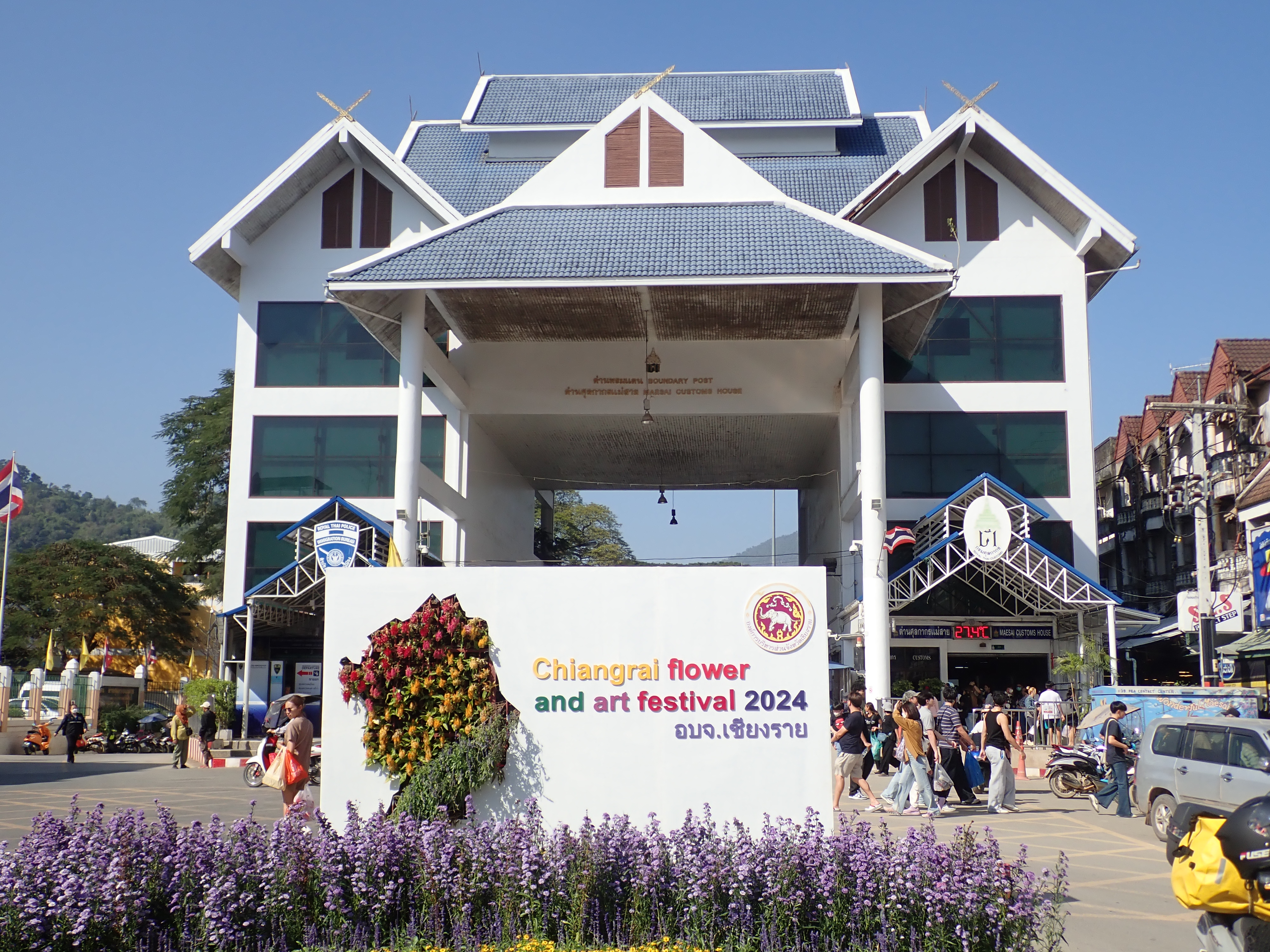
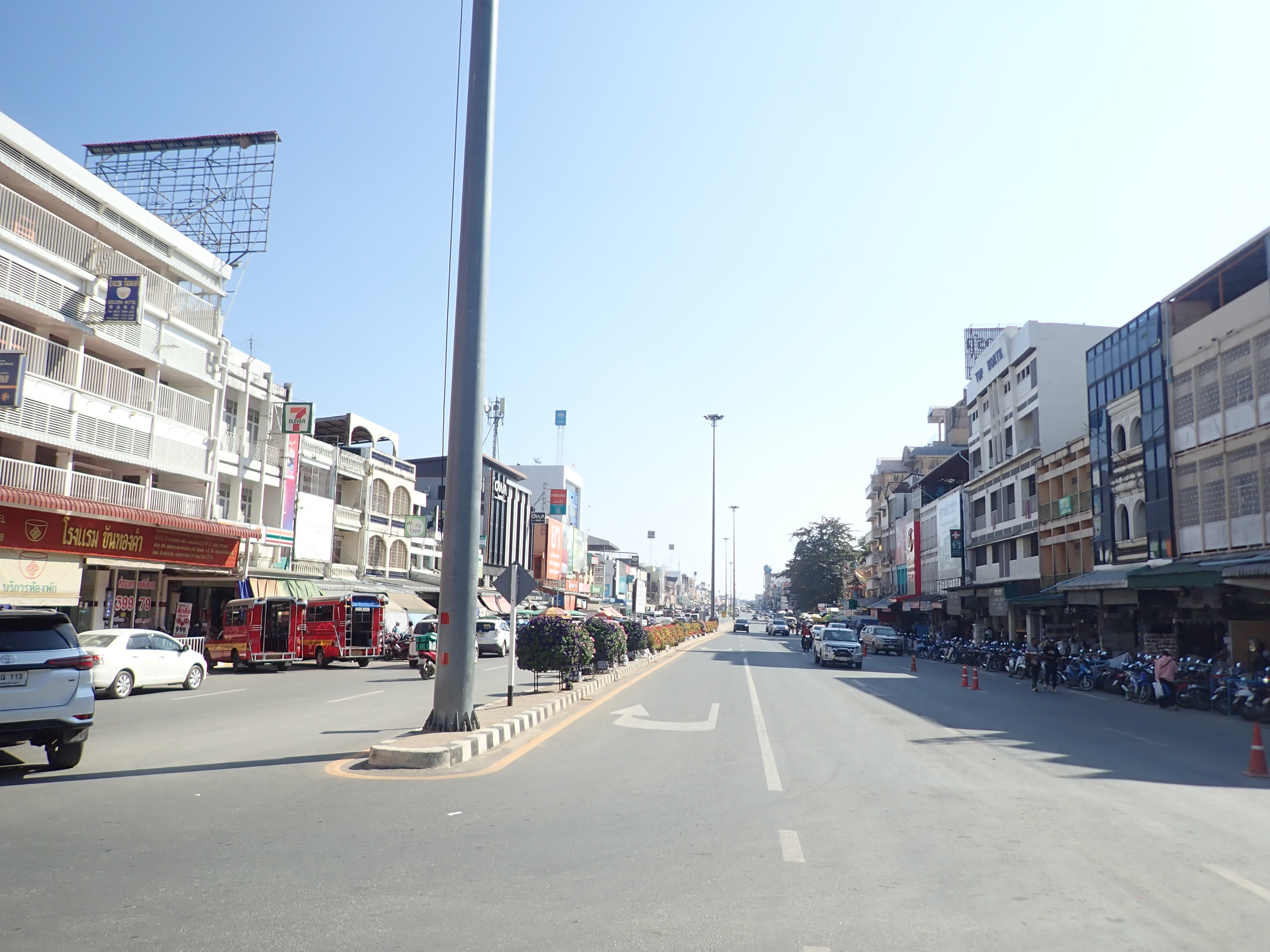
- From top, left to right: view of Mae Sai city, Monument marking the northernmost point of Thailand, Skywalk at Wat Pra That Doi Wao, Mae Sai Customs, The end of The highway no.1

- Location of Mae Sai in Thailand
- Coordinates: 20°25′41″N 99°53′1″E
- Country: Thailand
- Province: Chiang Rai Province

Government
  - Type: Subdistrict municipality

Area
  - Subdistrict Municipality: 5.13 km^{2} (1.98 sq mi)

Population
  - Subdistrict Municipality: 22,778
  - Density: 4,440/km^{2} (11,500/sq mi)
  - Metro: 212,815
- Time zone: UTC+7 (ICT)
- Website: www.maesai.go.th

Mae Sai (Thai: แม่สาย, pronounced [mɛ̂ː sǎːj]; Shan: မႄႈသၢႆ, pronounced [mɛ.sʰǎj]), is the district town of Mae Sai District in the far north of Chiang Rai Province, Thailand. Mae Sai is a major border crossing between Thailand and Myanmar; the town of Tachileik in Shan State is across the bridge. Asian Highway Network AH2 (Thailand Route 1 or Phahonyothin Road) crosses the Mae Sai River to the town of Tachileik in Myanmar. The town of Mae Sai and Tachileik are the bi-national conurbation shared between Thailand and Myanmar.

== History ==
Mae Sai sanitation district was created on 14 May 1956 It was upgraded to a municipality on 25 May 1999. The municipality governs neighbourhoods (mu) 1, 2, 3, 10 Wiang Phang Kham subdistrict and Mu 2, 6, 7, 8, 10 Mae Sai Subdistrict

== Geography ==
Neighboring districts are (from the north clockwise): Mae Sai River and Myanmar border; Mae Sai Mittrapab Subdistrict Municipality; Wiang Phang Kham Subdistrict Municipality.

The Tham Luang Nang Non cave is within the subdistrict.

== See also ==
- Mae Sai District
- Mae Sai River
- Mae Sai Subdistrict
