= Pong Pha =

Pong Pha โป่งผา
- Tambon
- Interactive map of Pong Pha
- Country: Thailand
- Province: Chiang Rai
- District: Mae Sai

Population (2017)
  - Total: 16,476
- Time zone: UTC+7 (ICT)
- Postal code: 57130
- TIS 1099: 570904

Pong Pha (Thai: โป่งผา) is a tambon (subdistrict) of Mae Sai District, in Chiang Rai Province, Thailand. In 2017 it had a population of 16,476 people.

== Geography ==
The subdistrict is on the border of Myanmar, formed by the Doi Nang Non mountain range. Tham Luang–Khun Nam Nang Non Forest Park with the Tham Luang Nang Non cave is in the subdistrict.

== Administration ==
=== Central administration ===
The tambon is divided into 12 administrative villages (mubans).

No.	Name	Thai
1.	Ban Chong	บ้านจ้อง
2.	Ban Nong O	บ้านหนองอ้อ
3.	Ban Pa Fae	บ้านป่าแฝ
4.	Ban San Sai Puyi	บ้านสันทรายปู่ยี่
5.	Ban Nam Cham	บ้านน้ำจำ
6.	Ban San Sai Mun	บ้านสันทรายมูล
7.	Ban San Pa Sak	บ้านสันป่าสัก
8.	Ban Na Pong	บ้านนาปง
9.	Ban Chong Wat	บ้านจ้องวัด
10.	Ban Chong Den	บ้านจ้องเด่น
11.	Ban Nam Cham Nuea	บ้านน้ำจำเหนือ
12.	Ban Nam Cham Klang	บ้านน้ำจำกลาง

=== Local administration ===
The area of the subdistrict is covered by the subdistrict administrative organization (SAO) Pong Pha (องค์การบริหารส่วนตำบลโป่งผา).
