= Mae Sai district =

District of Thailand

Mae Sai แม่สาย
- District
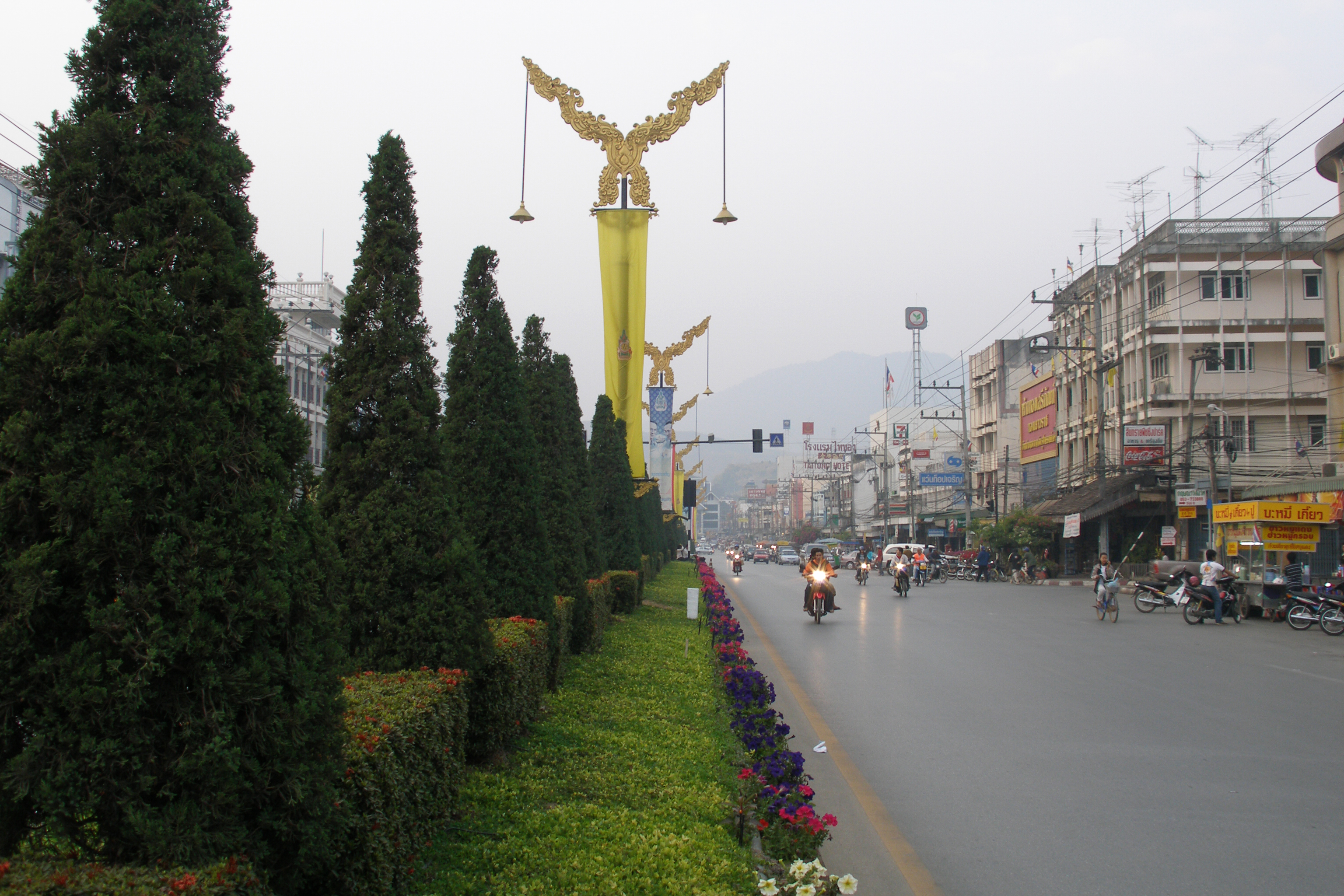
- Mae Sai Town

- District location in Chiang Rai province

- Location in Thailand
- Coordinates: 20°25′41″N 99°53′1″E
- Country: Thailand
- Province: Chiang Rai
- Seat: Mae Sai

Area
  - Total: 285.0 km^{2} (110.0 sq mi)

Population (2005)
  - Total: 86,298
  - Density: 302.8/km^{2} (784/sq mi)
- Time zone: UTC+7 (ICT)
- Postal code: 57130
- Geocode: 5709

Mae Sai (Thai: แม่สาย, pronounced [mɛ̂ː sǎːj]; Shan: မႄႈသၢႆ, pronounced [mɛ.sʰǎj]) is the northernmost district (amphoe) of Chiang Rai province in northern Thailand. The town of Mae Sai is a major border crossing between Thailand and Myanmar. Asian Highway Network AH2 (Thailand Route 1 or Phahonyothin Road) crosses the Mae Sai River to the town Tachileik in Myanmar.

One-day passes for non-Burmese nationals crossing into Myanmar are issued at Myanmar customs in Tachileik. Passports are confiscated and a temporary travel permit is issued; the permit is exchanged for the traveler's passport upon crossing back into Thailand. (No longer available as of 2016.) Since the changes in Thai immigration policy since March 2016, crossing this border as a foreign national is highly dependent on individual Thai customs officers, as they have discretion.

Mae Sai is 259 km (161 mi) north of Chiang Mai, 61 km (38 mi) north of Chiang Rai, and 850 km (528 mi) north of Bangkok.

== Geography ==
Neighboring districts are (from the east clockwise): Chiang Saen, Mae Chan, and Mae Fa Luang. To the north is Myanmar, separated by the Mae Sai River and the Ruak River. The westernmost part of the district is dominated by the hills of the Daen Lao Range, the most important one is the Doi Tung with the Wat Phra That Doi Tung temple on top. Doi Nang Non is another notable mountain in Mae Sai District.

== History ==
The minor district (king amphoe) Mae Sai was created on 1 March 1939, when the two tambons Mae Sai and Pong Pha were split off from Chiang Saen District. The area was upgraded to a full district on 1 May 1950.

== Administration ==
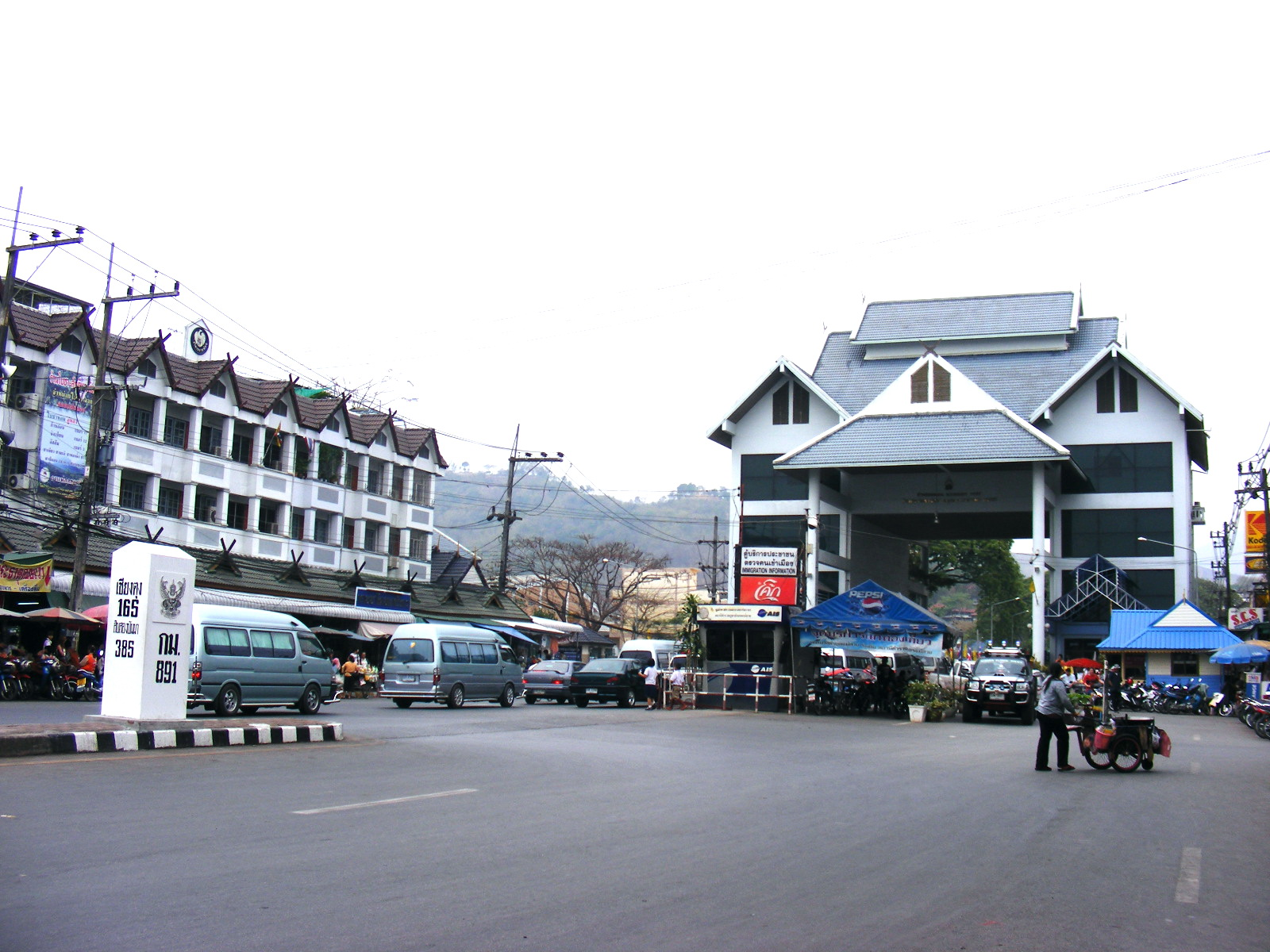
Myanmar-Thailand bridge, Mae Sai

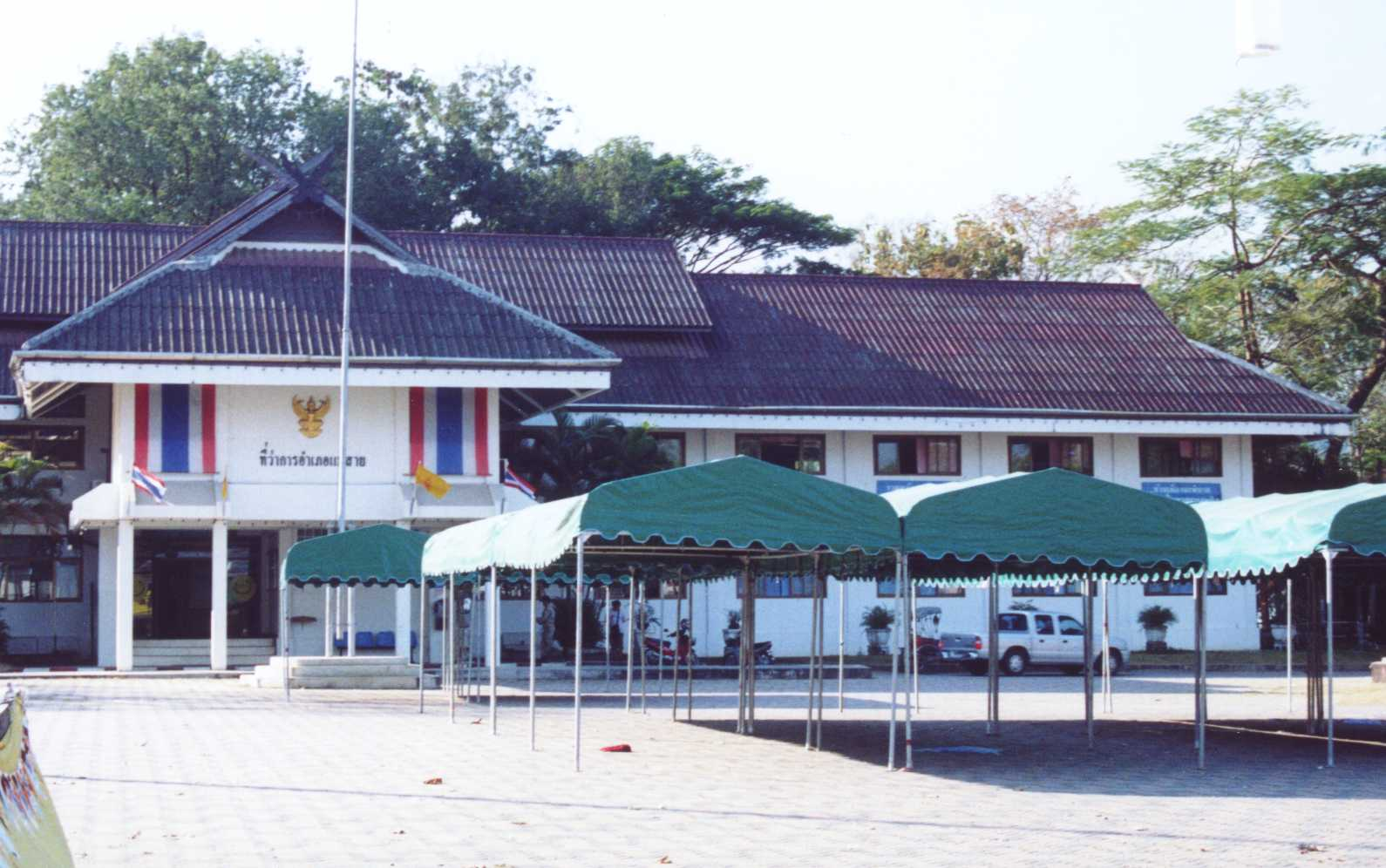
District office

The district is divided into eight subdistricts (tambons), which in turn are further subdivided into 92 villages (mubans). There are two subdistrict municipalities (thesaban tambons) in the district: Mai Sai itself covering parts of the tambons Mae Sai and Wiang Phang Kham, and Huai Khrai covering parts of tambon Huai Khrai. There are a further eight tambon administrative organizations (TAO).

No.	Name	Thai name	Villages	Pop.
1.	Mae Sai	แม่สาย	14	21,697
2.	Huai Khrai	ห้วยไคร้	11	7,609
3.	Ko Chang	เกาะช้าง	13	9,964
4.	Pong Pha	โป่งผา	12	8,348
5.	Si Mueang Chum	ศรีเมืองชุม	9	5,090
6.	Wiang Phang Kham	เวียงพางคำ	13	19,945
8.	Ban Dai	บ้านด้าย	8	4,117
9.	Pong Ngam	โป่งงาม	12	9,528

The geocode 7 is not used.
