= Tito Traversa =

Italian rock climber (2001–2013)

- Born: Tito Claudio Traversa; April 22, 2001; Cirié, Italy
- Died: July 5, 2013 (aged 12); Grenoble, France
- Cause of death: Climbing accident

Tito Claudio Traversa (April 22, 2001 – July 5, 2013) was a 12-year-old Italian rock climber who died from complications after a climbing accident in which he fell from a height of 20 metres (66 ft) to the ground on July 2, 2013. Prior to the accident, he had gained international attention for being one of the youngest climbers to ascend sport climbing routes at technical grades of 8a (5.13b), 8b (5.13d), and 8b+ (5.14a).

== Early life ==
Tito was born on April 22, 2001 in Cirié, Italy, to Giovanni Traversa and Barbara Sirio. Giovanni worked at Olivetti, and Barbara ran a dance school in Ivrea. Giovanni was a former sports climber who had climbed an 8a in the 1990s. Tito started playing sports at a young age, including rollerblading, skateboarding, skiing, biking, and ice hockey. For a time, he played for the Draghi di Torino.

== Climbing career ==
Tito had done some rock climbing at the age of five, but became more interested in the sport after a vacation with Giovanni to the Verdon Gorge in July 2007, where he top roped a third grade route. On the way home, Tito had wanted to see the eighth grade routes Giovanni had climbed in Finale Ligure, and declared, "Voglio diventare più bravo di te!" ("I want to be better than you!"). Within a month, he completed a fourth grade route in Finale. He began competing at the end of 2008, winning the Lecco Promo Rock, placing fifth in bouldering at the Italian Bouldering Cup, and third in difficulty at the Arco Rock Junior. In 2009, he became the Italian Under-10 Bouldering Champion, and began redpointing 7b+ routes in June.

On March 29, 2010, 8-year-old Tito redpointed an 8a (5.13b) graded sport climbing route in Donnas, overtaking Adam Ondra as the youngest person to do so. He redpointed his second 8a route on April 1 in Valle dell'Orco. Spanish climbing magazine Escalar noted his rapid progression and small height of 1.31 metres (4.3 ft) as "surprising". On May 15, he redpointed his third 8a route in the span of less than two months. By October 2010, he had redpointed an 8a+ route at the age of 9.

On January 23, 2011, 9-year-old Tito redpointed his first 8b route in Castillon, Alpes-Maritimes, again overtaking Ondra's previous age record. He forfeited a competition to qualify for the Italian Championships to complete the route. On March 24, 2011, Tito redpointed his second 8b route, drawing compliments from French climber Romain Desgranges. Tito would redpoint his third 8b route on June 27, 2011, his fourth on July 5, 2011, his fifth on July 19, 2011, and his sixth on September 6, 2011.

On March 29, 2012, Tito redpointed his first 8b+ route in Valle d'Aosta, narrowly beating Brooke Raboutou in age to become the youngest climber to do so.

Tito trained twice a week during the school year at the Bside climbing gym in Ivrea, training indoors during the winter and outdoors in good weather. He went rock climbing every other weekend. According to Giovanni, he did not actually climb very often, and lived an otherwise normal life. At school, Tito would receive questions about climbing when he brought his climbing equipment or medals.

In a 2010 interview, Tito said that he looked up to Adam Ondra and Chris Sharma as top role models. Other climbers had compared Tito with Ondra due to his rapid progression at a young age. In 2011, Ondra expressed his admiration for Tito.

Tito had earned a few climbing nicknames, including Il ragnetto delle rocce ("The Rock Spider"), Niño mutante ("Mutant child"), O pequeno grande escalador ("The little big climber"), Prodige Italien ("Italian prodigy"), and Piccolo Ondra ("Little Ondra").

== Accident and death ==
On July 2, 2013, Tito and a group of climbers left Italy for a climbing trip in Orpierre, France. According to Giovanni, it was the first time Tito had climbed without his father present; Tito was reportedly happy to be climbing with his friends as an independent. The group consisted of 10 young climbers and three adults. At 11:15 a.m., after completing a warmup climb on a 6b route, Tito had leaned back to lower himself when eight of the 12 quickdraws he was using failed, dropping him 20 metres (66 ft) to the ground and inflicting fatal head injuries. He was airlifted to the Grenoble Alpes University Hospital. Despite initial reporting to the contrary, Tito was not wearing a helmet at the time of the accident.

Giovanni and Barbara immediately left for France following the news. Tito was placed in a medically induced coma and given emergency surgery to reduce his hematoma, without success. He was declared brain dead on the evening of July 5, 2013, three days after the accident. Giovanni and Barbara agreed to donate his organs; two children received his heart and liver each, and two adults received his kidneys. Tito's body was repatriated, and a funeral was held at the Ivrea Cathedral on July 19, 2013, attended by around 500 people. His ashes were scattered in the Aosta Valley, a favourite climbing location for Tito.

=== Investigation and lawsuit ===
French prosecutor Philippe Toccanier suspected the cause of the accident to be incorrect rope assembly through the quickdraws, and suspected the manufacturer of the quickdraws to be responsible. French police provided example pictures of the incorrectly assembled quickdraws, with the carabiners threaded only through the rubber keeper, and not through the full-strength sewn loop at the ends of the quickdraws that are designed to support the climber's weight. Eight of these quickdraws had been incorrectly assembled this way, with the remaining quickdraws placed too low to have broken Tito's fall. The quickdraws did not belong to Tito, but to another girl his age in the climbing group. The mother of the girl, who did not have any climbing experience herself, had purchased the quickdraws upon request from her daughter; the mother later testified in 2018 that neither the climbing shop nor the packaging provided any assembly instructions. The girl had assembled the quickdraws, which would later be used by Tito in the fatal accident. According to a testimony given by one of the other climbers, it was common for climbers to rotate between using each other's gear.

On August 20, 2013, public prosecutor Raffaele Guariniello launched a manslaughter investigation into the incident, following a complaint filed through Giovanni's lawyer, Paolo Chicco. French authorities had reported to Italian investigators similar findings in that the incorrect quickdraw assemblies were at fault. Guariniello began to investigate the owner of the company that manufactured the rubber keepers, the owner of the shop that sold the quickdraws, the manager of the Bside climbing gym, and the two instructors who accompanied the group, under charges of manslaughter. A sixth suspect, the mother of the girl who assembled the quickdraws, was also considered. Tito was not considered to have been at fault.

On December 17, 2015, Guariniello requested three indictments for:

- Luca Giammarco, owner of the Bside climbing gym Tito attended
- Nicola Galizia, one of the instructors present at the incident
- Carlo Paglioli, owner of Aludesign, the company that manufactured the rubber keepers

The three were charged with manslaughter resulting in Tito's death. Giammarco claimed that Bside did not organize the trip and thus did not take out insurance, meaning that Giovanni and Barbara were unlikely to receive compensation. Galizia also did not have insurance for the trip.

On June 28, 2017, the trials for Giammarco, Galizia, and Paglioli began, presided over by Judge Rossella La Gatta. Public prosecutor Francesco La Rosa had assumed the case following Guariniello's retirement. The trial was reset on November 27, 2017, following La Gatta's transfer to a different division. Dr. Maria Iannibelli was assigned as the replacement judge, with the first hearings for the restarted trial scheduled for December 6, 2017.

On April 17, 2018, La Rosa requested an acquittal of Giammarco due to insufficient evidence, and requested convictions of Galizia and Paglioli—four years and four months for Galizia, and four years for Paglioli. On May 16, 2018, Iannibelli sentenced Galizia to two years imprisonment for manslaughter and ordered him to pay €21,000 in judicial expenses. The court found Galizia to be responsible for checking the quickdraws. Because it was Galizia's first offense, he was not required to serve time. Giammarco and Paglioli were acquitted.

Giovanni criticized the outcome of the case, arguing that testimonies gathered by the investigation were not corroborated and that the case was complicated by Guariniello's retirement, resulting in only one of the responsible parties being punished. He said that he had only received €100,000 and an apology from Paglioli, and had donated the money to Casa UGI to create projects in Tito's memory. The Italian climbing magazine Pareti criticized Guariniello's investigation, calling Giammarco's indictment "absurd" and that no one should be guilty of failing to notice the quickdraws.

On January 9, 2020, the Turin Court of Appeals upheld the two-year sentence of Galizia.

=== Public reaction ===
Tito's accident and death drew attention from the international climbing community. Adam Ondra, who had a mutual adoration for Tito, was shocked by Tito's death and appealed to the climbing community to learn from the incident. Orpierre mayor Julie Ravel insisted the climbing area remained safe and was regularly maintained.

Tito's case has been cited as an example of the risks with climbing and the dangers of improperly assembled equipment.

Tito's accident sparked a national debate in Italy on whether helmets should be required for minors while climbing. In a Desnivel interview, Adam Ondra claimed that it was unnecessary outside of places with a danger of rockfall. Antonio Ungaro, general secretary of Federazione Arrampicata Sportiva Italiana, said that it was not up to them to decide whether children should be required to wear helmets. Giovanni and Barbara maintained that a helmet could have prevented Tito's death.

On July 22 and 23, 2013, the Italian team at the Bouldering European Youth Cup honoured Tito by wearing his name on their t-shirts.

The 2013 Rock Junior competition, held in Arco, created the Traversa Trophy in honour of Tito, awarded to the best male and female lead climber. Both the 2013 Rock Junior and Rock Master played a special video dedicated to Tito on the jumbotron; Tito had dreamed of competing at the Rock Master. Ramón Julian Puigblanque dedicated his victory at the Rock Master to Tito.

On May 31, 2014, Stefano Ghisolfi redpointed a new 9a route, which he named "TCT" (Tito's initials). The route would later be onsighted by Adam Ondra, Tito's idol. In September 2021, Italian climber Gianluca Vighetti climbed TCT at the age of 12, the same age Tito was when he died.

At the 2014 and 2015 Eporedia Active Days, an international outdoor sports event held in Ivrea, a bouldering competition named the "Tito Traversa Memorial" was hosted in memory of Tito.

Educational projects and a climbing school in Cartosio were named after Tito.
