= Munter =

Munter or Münter is a surname. Notable people with the surname include:

- Alex Munter (born 1968), Canadian politician and journalist, CEO of the Children's Hospital of Eastern Ontario
- Cameron Munter (born 1954), US ambassador to Pakistan
- Friedrich Münter (1761–1830), Danish bishop and scholar
- Gabriele Münter (1887–1962), German Expressionist artist
- Leilani Münter (born 1976), American race car driver and environmental activist
- Rosanna Munter (born 1987), Swedish singer
- Scott Munter (born 1980), American baseball pitcher
- Werner Munter (born 1941), Swiss mountain guide, author, and safety expert

== See also ==
- Jared Mason, nicknamed "Munter", a fictional character in the television show Outrageous Fortune
- Münter hitch, a simple knot commonly used by climbers and cavers, invented by Werner Munter
- Carl Munters (1897–1989), Swedish inventor
