= Radium release hitch =

Radium Release Hitch
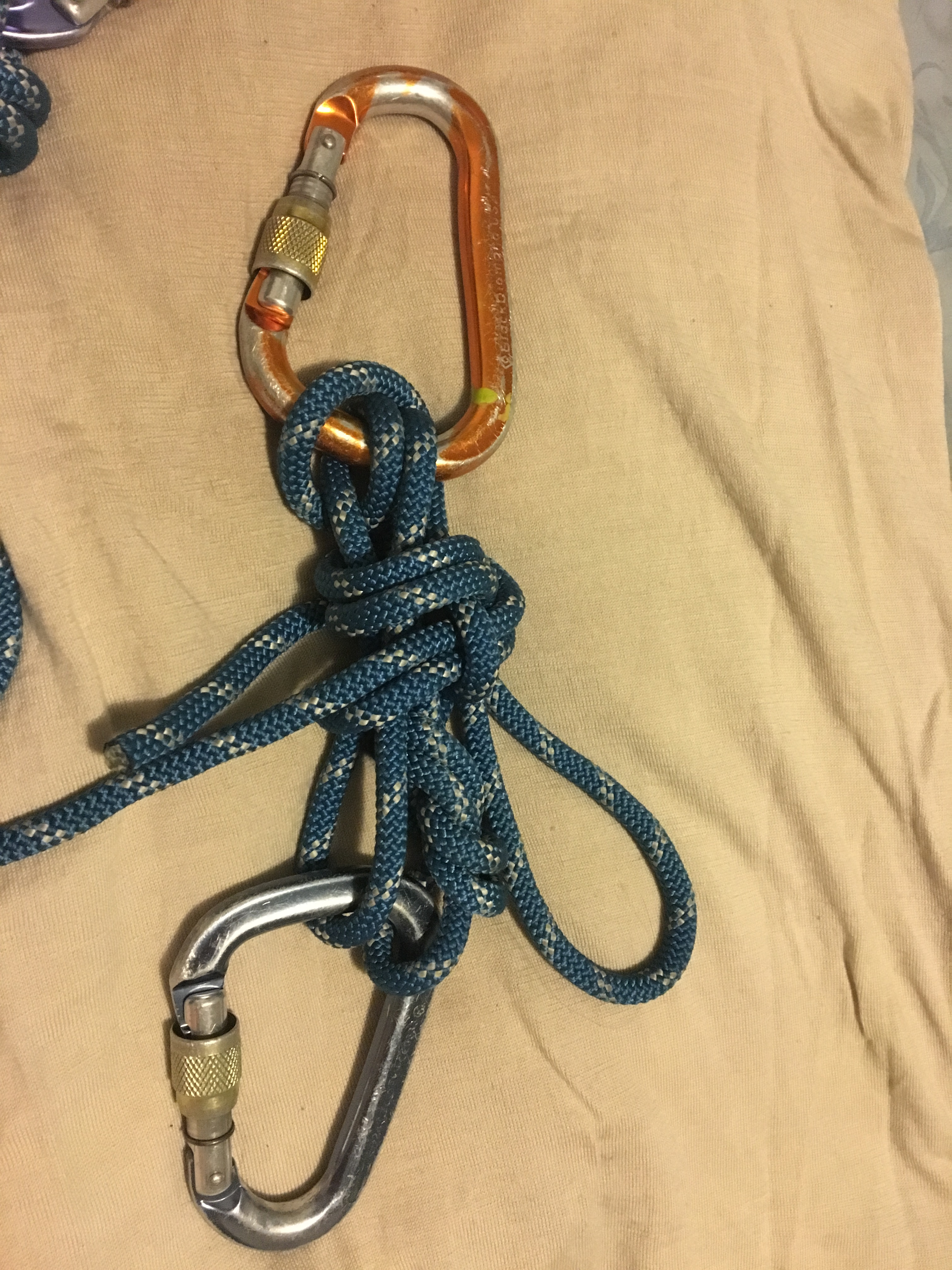
- Category: Hitch
- Efficiency: 30kn
- Releasing: Load releasing
- Typical use: technical rope rescue

A radium release hitch is a load-releasing hitch using 3:1 mechanical advantage which is used in a two-rope technical rescue system. The Radium Release Hitch allows a load to be transferred from one rope to another and is commonly rigged into the belay line prior to the operation of a two-rope technical rescue system.

A radium release hitch is typically tied with 10 meters of 8mm rope and two locking carabiners. A reasonable length for the hitch (distance between the 2 carabiners) is 10 to 15 cm.

== History ==
The Radium Release Hitch was developed by Kirk Mauthner (who lives near Radium Hot Springs, hence the name) as a result of the extensive comparative analysis of release devices undertaken during 1997 through 1999

== Usage ==
- Passing knots
- Untensioning a locked lowering device or locked up prussiks.

== Tying ==
- Tie a figure 8 on a bight at one end of the cord and clip it into the load carabiner on its spine side.
- Clip the standing part of the rope through the anchor carabiner and back down through the load carabiner; bring the rope back up to the anchor carabiner.
- Tie a Munter hitch on its gate side of the anchor carabiner. Ensure that the Munter hitch is in the release position with the in-feed rope toward the gate side of the carabiner
- Secure the Radium Release Hitch using a bight to tie a half hitch on a bight around the entire stem below the Munter hitch, and then back it up with an overhand on a bight knot again around the entire stem.
- Tie a figure 8 on a bight at the other end, and clip it to a secure anchor.

== See also ==
List of knots

Mountain Rescue
