= Carabineer (disambiguation) =

A number of words are derived from the carbine firearm:

- Carabinier, a carbine-carrying cavalry soldier
- Carabinieri, the Italian gendarmerie
- Carabineros de Chile, the Chilean police.
- Carabiner, a rope connecting device
