= Bolt (climbing) =

Anchor point used in sport climbing

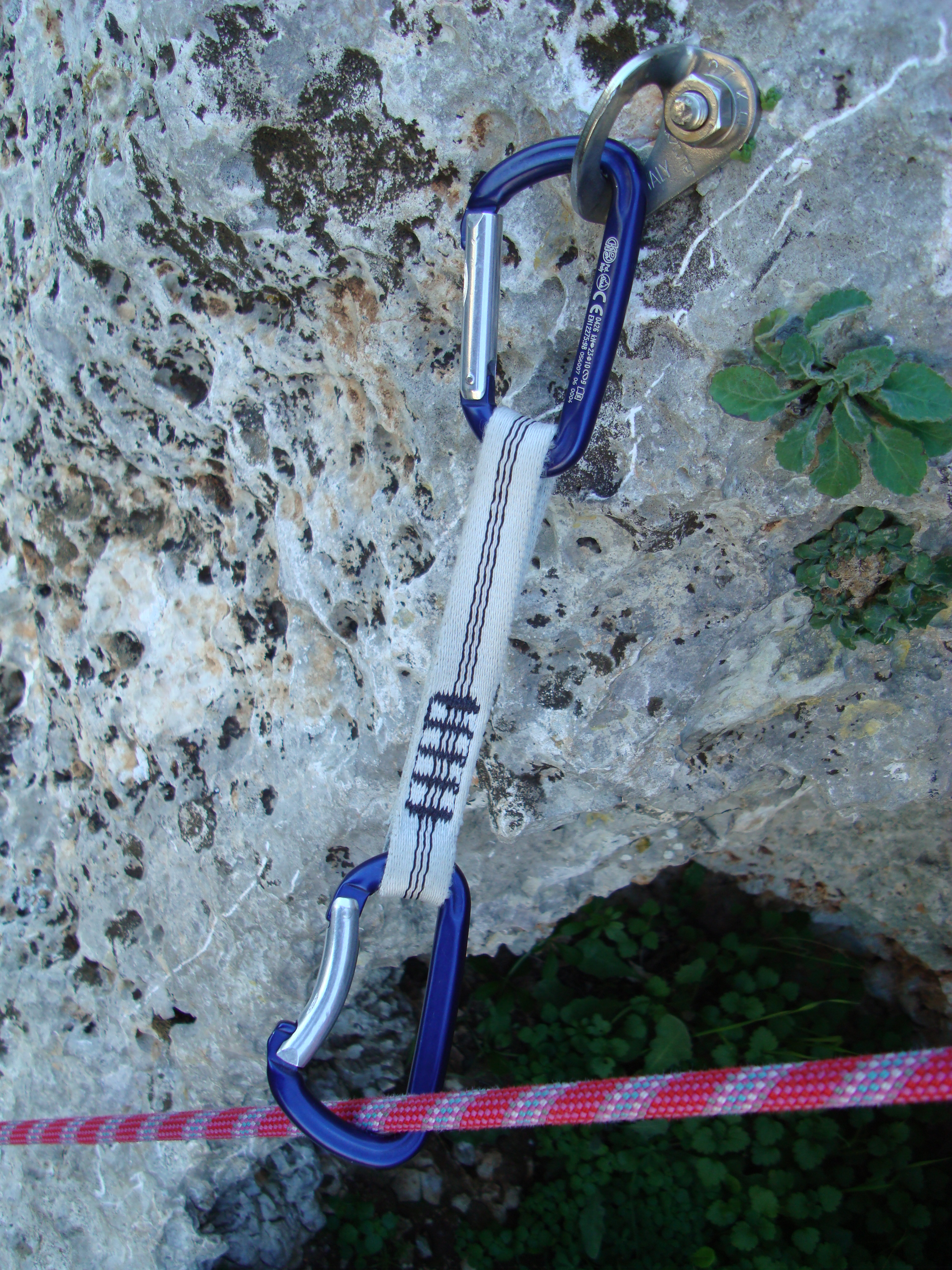
Dynamic rope clipped into a quickdraw, that is clipped to a bolt hanger, which is attached to a fixed bolt.

In rock climbing, a bolt is a permanent anchor fixed into a hole drilled in the rock as a form of climbing protection. Most bolts are either self-anchoring expansion bolts or fixed in place with liquid resin. Climbing routes that are bolted are known as sport climbs, and those that do not use (or allow) bolts, are known as traditional climbs.

== Description ==
While bolts are commonplace in rock and gym climbing there is no universal vocabulary to describe them. Generally, a bolt hanger (or a fixed hanger) is a combination of a fixed bolt and a specialized stainless steel hanger designed to accept a carabiner, whereas in certain regions a bolt runner (or a carrot) describes a hangerless bolt (where the climber must provide their own hanger bracket such as a rivet hanger). A climbing rope is then clipped into the carabiner. Generally quickdraws or slings are employed between bolt hangers and the rope to reduce drag when ascending, belaying and rappelling.

== Types ==
Variations of climbing bolts include:

- Ring bolt has a loop on one end so it presents as a U-shape embedded in the wall.
- Glue-in bolt resembles a pin that is popular in Europe.
- Carrot bolt is a metal hex-headed machine bolt used in Australia to function like a bolt but with no fixed bolt hanger attached; climbers attach to the carrot bolt by using a version of a rivet hanger or by attaching a removable bolt hanger plate.

== Use ==
Rock climbing routes that have been bolted for climbing protection — but not as a source of aid to help progression — are called sport climbs. Where a route has bolts to aid progression (i.e. a climber can pull on the bolt), it is called an aid climb. In competition lead climbing, all of the routes are bolted.

== Lifespan ==
Bolts degrade over time — particularly in coastal areas from salt, but also from stress corrosion cracking — and eventually, all sport climbs need to be re-fitted after a number of years. The highest quality titanium bolts are too expensive to use regularly, and the next highest quality stainless steel bolts have an expected lifespan of circa 20—25 years (the cheaper plated stainless steel bolts have a shorter span); and in 2015, the American Alpine Club established an "anchor replacement fund" to help replace the bolts on America's estimated 60,000 sport climbing routes.

== See also ==
- Piton
- Climbing equipment
