= Bolt snap =

Sprung slide gated snap hook

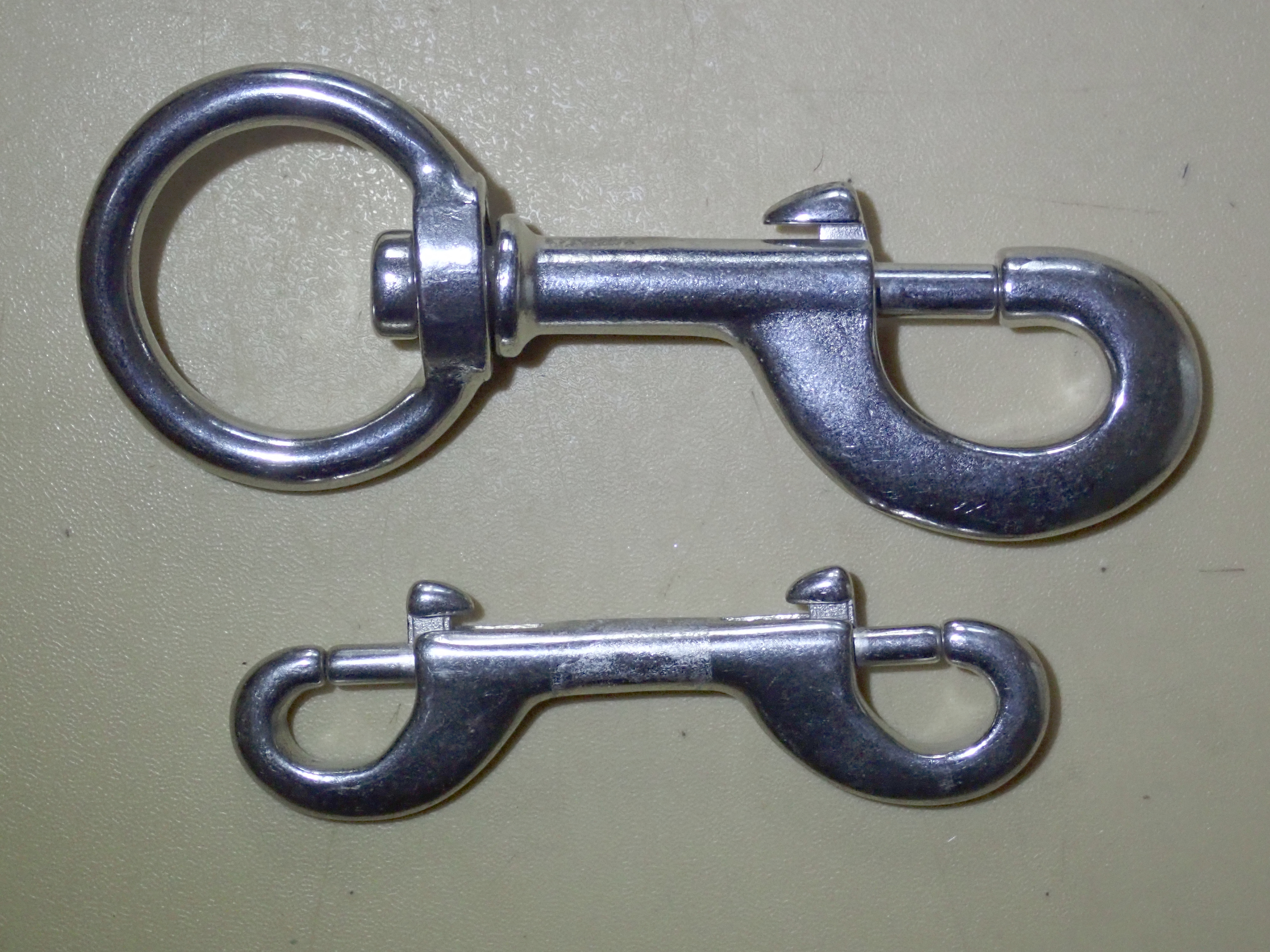
- Swivel ring single end and double end bolt snaps
- Uses: Reasonably secure temporary fastening of a light load, suitable for one handed operation.
- Related items: Carabiner, Snap hook, Snap shackle, Piston hank

A bolt snap is a type of snap hook with a manually operated bolt action slide gate of medium security used to clip a light load to a ring, eye, loop or bight to temporarily secure or suspend an object. They are used for a wide variety of applications including dog leads and for clipping scuba equipment to the diving harness. A similar but more secure device used to attach sails to a stay is known as a piston hank.

The most common type has a single snap hook at one end and a swivel ring at the other, but double ended bolt snaps and single ended snaps with a swivel shackle are also available. There are a few variations on the style of the hook, gate opening and swivel style. The characteristic element of the bolt snap is the bolt action gate. This is a spring loaded rod which slides longitudinally inside the body of the clip against a compression spring to open the gate of the hook, and returns to rest against the tip of the hook by the action of the spring when released.

Bolt snaps are not generally load rated, and are not used to suspend heavy loads. Most applications are in the load range where the user can lift the object to be clipped, or can hold the load manually.

== Structure ==
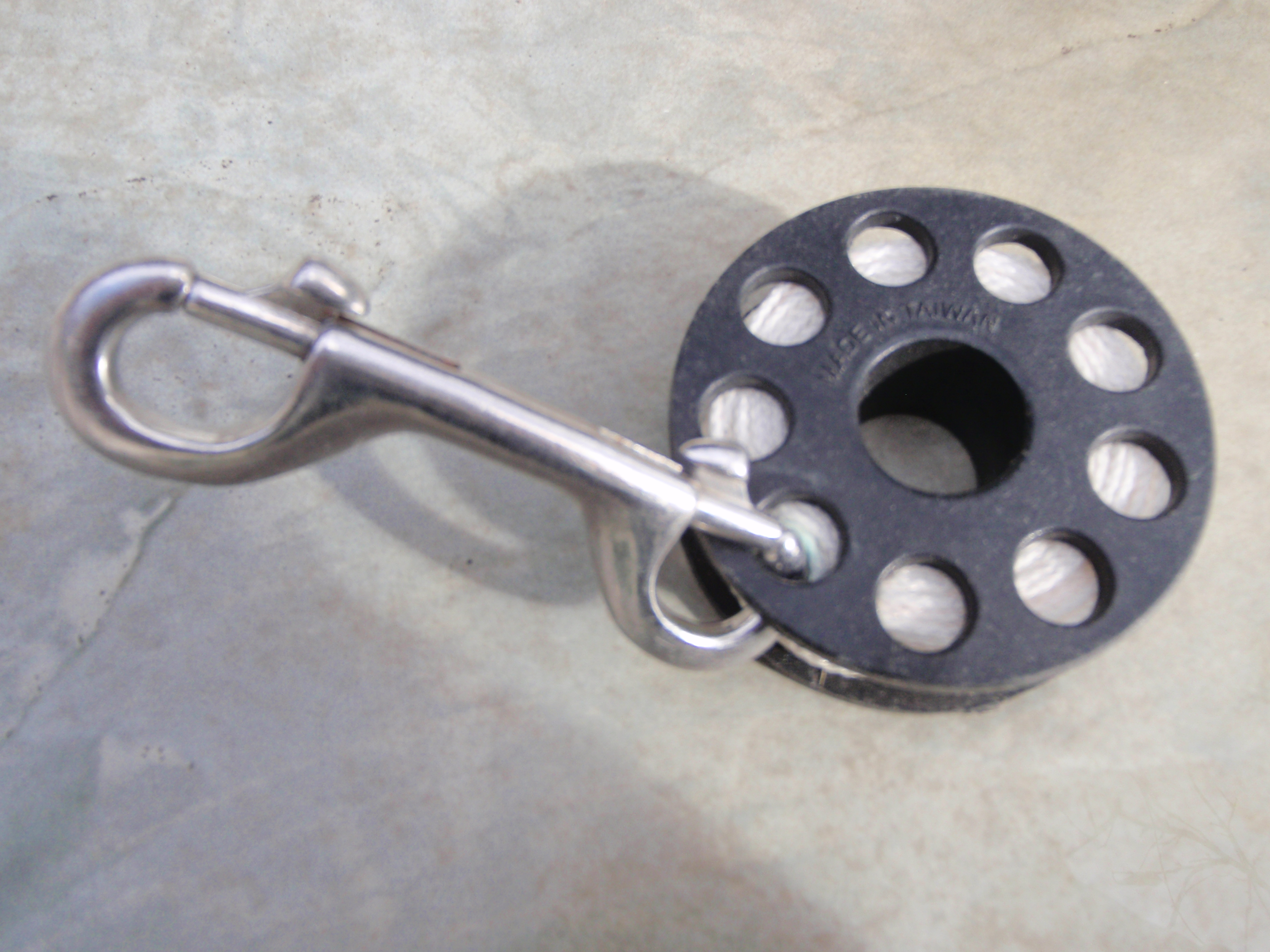
Diving spool with double ended bolt snap

Bolt snaps are made of plastic or metal. The metal used is stainless steel or brass for diving and boating applications, with a stainless steel spring. Chrome plated zinc and plastic bodies are only suitable for light loads such as key rings, handbag straps, and leads for small dogs.

The single ended bolt snap has a hook at one end with the opening in line with a hollow shaft, at the other end of which there is a flanged pin for the swivel fitting. The swivel fitting is usually a ring, but can also be a swivel shackle body. The tip of the hook is directly in line with the central axis of the hole in the shaft, so that the piston gate makes contact with the tip when closed, and the hook curves round to point at the hole. The gate is a cylindrical "bolt" with a sliding fit in the hollow shaft. It has a short rounded tab on the side which provides a grip for finger or thumb operation. This tab slides in a short slot in the outer side of the hole in the shaft.

There is a compression coil spring in the hole in the shaft between the gate bolt and the bottom of the hole, which will return the bolt to rest against the tip of the hook when released, preventing passage of anything in either direction through the mouth of the hook when the bolt is in place. The bolt snap does not have a socket in the tip of the hook for the bolt, as the load is carried by the hook in normal service, and this type of closure is unsuited to multi-directional or highly dynamic loading.

The double ended bolt snap has a hook at each end of the body, with co-axial opposing bolts. The hook gates normally both face the same way.

=== Variations ===
Various sizes and materials may be available for the style variations listed.

- Single end
  - With round swivel loop
    - Centred loop
    - Offset loop
    - Small loop
  - with oblong loop for webbing
    - Fixed loop
    - Swivel loop
  - With swivel shackle
- Double end
  - Short or long body
- Butterfly gate

== Operation ==
The bolt snap is usually operated using one hand to manipulate the hook and gate. If the object to which it is to be clipped is unstable, like the collar on a dog, the other hand may be used to hold it in place. The hook body is generally gripped by the fingers, one of which may be passed through the swivel ring to help support and stabilise the load when applicable, and the thumb used to pull the bolt back to open the gate. The opening is then passed over the target and the bolt released, so that it snaps back to close the gate.

To remove, the same method is used, and the load must be supported to unhook while the gate is open. The clip cannot be removed under normal tensile load conditions even with the gate open.

== Applications ==
=== Scuba diving ===
Bolt snaps are commonly used in scuba diving to clip equipment to the diver's harness for security and to keep them in place. The bolt snap style of connector is favoured because it is operable with one hand, is quick and easy to use, can support the relevant loads, and is reasonably secure against accidental operation.

=== Animal leads ===
Bolt snaps are one of the common connectors used for attaching tethers to animal collars or harnesses.

=== Luggage and fashion accessories ===
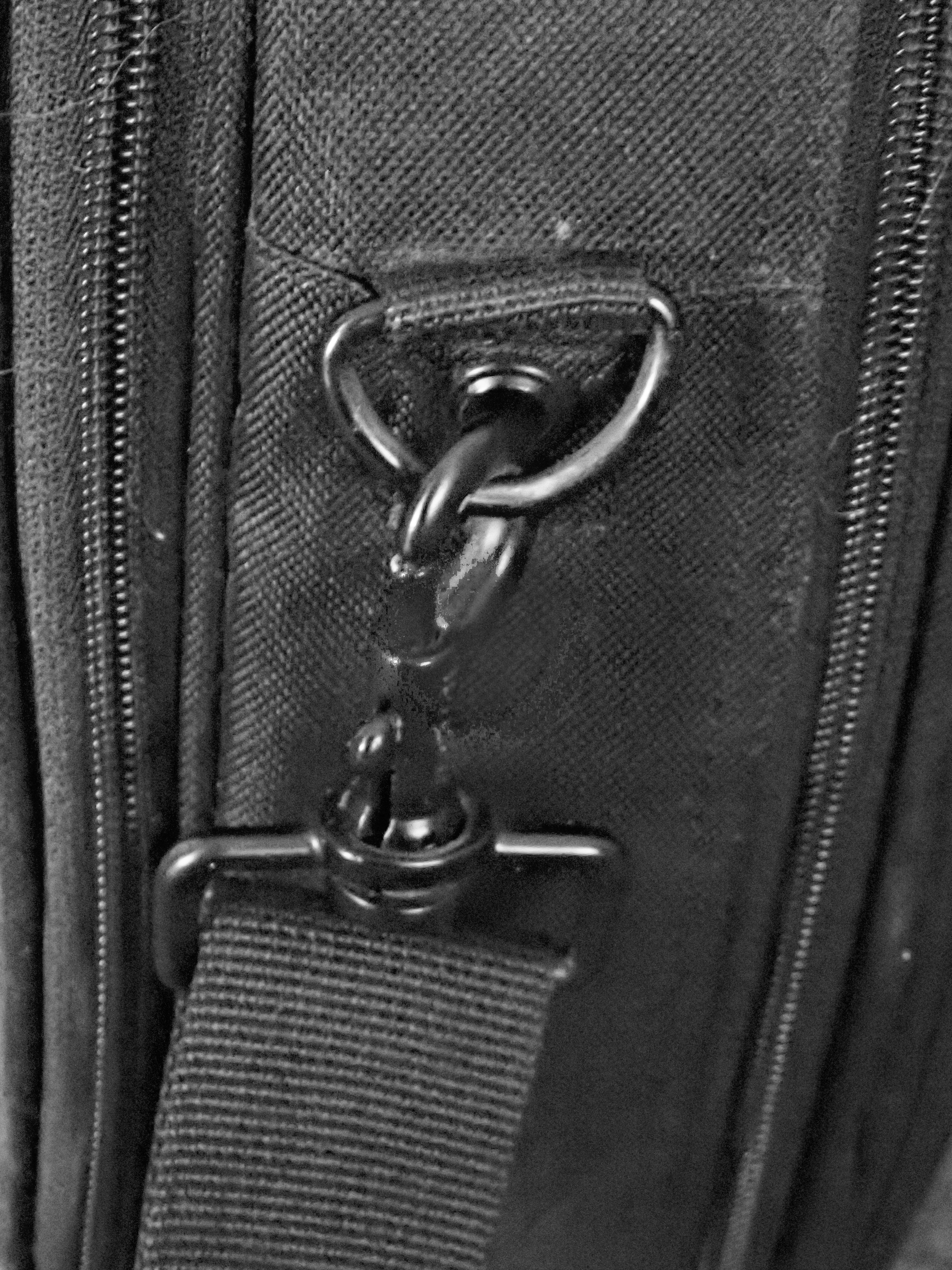
Swivel bolt snap on laptop bag strap

Bolt snaps are sometimes used to attach straps and handles to luggage and handbags.

== See also ==
- Carabiner – Shackle with a spring-loaded gate
- Lobster clasp – Type of jewelry fastener
- Shackle – Metal assembly which functions as a removable connecting link
