= Sport climbing =

Type of rock climbing

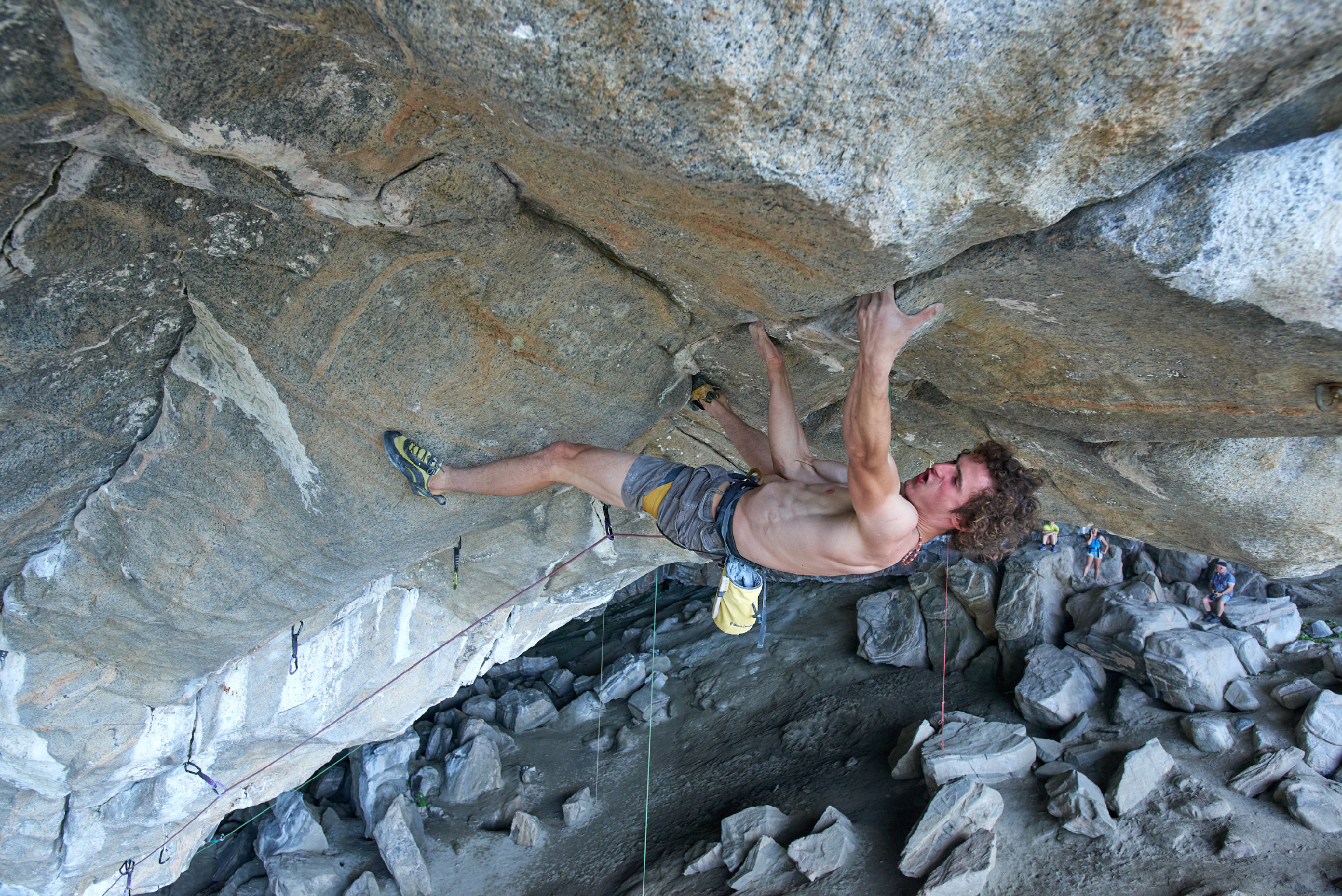
Adam Ondra on the hardest sport climbing route in history, Silence 9c (5.15d), in Flatanger, Norway

Sport climbing (or bolted climbing) is a type of free climbing in the sport of rock climbing in which the lead climber clips their rope—via a quickdraw—into pre-drilled in-situ bolts on the rockface for their protection as they ascend the route. Sport climbing differs from the riskier and more demanding format of traditional climbing where the lead climber—as they ascend the route—must also find places into which temporary and removable protection equipment (e.g. spring-loaded camming devices) can be inserted for their safety.

Sport climbing dates from the early 1980s when leading French rock climbers wanted to climb blanker face climbing routes that offered none of the cracks or fissures into which temporary protection equipment could be safely inserted. While bolting natural rock faces was controversial—and remains a focus of debate in climbing ethics—the safer format of sport climbing grew rapidly in popularity both for novice and advanced climbers. All subsequent technical grade milestones in rock climbing would come from sport climbing.

The safer discipline of sport climbing also led to the rapid growth in competition climbing, which made its Olympic debut at the 2020 Summer Olympics. While competition climbing consists of three distinct rock climbing disciplines—lead climbing (the bolted sport-climbing element), bouldering (where no bolts or any protection is needed as the routes are short), and speed climbing (also not bolted and instead uses a top roping format for protection)—it is sometimes confusingly referred to as "sport climbing".

== Description ==
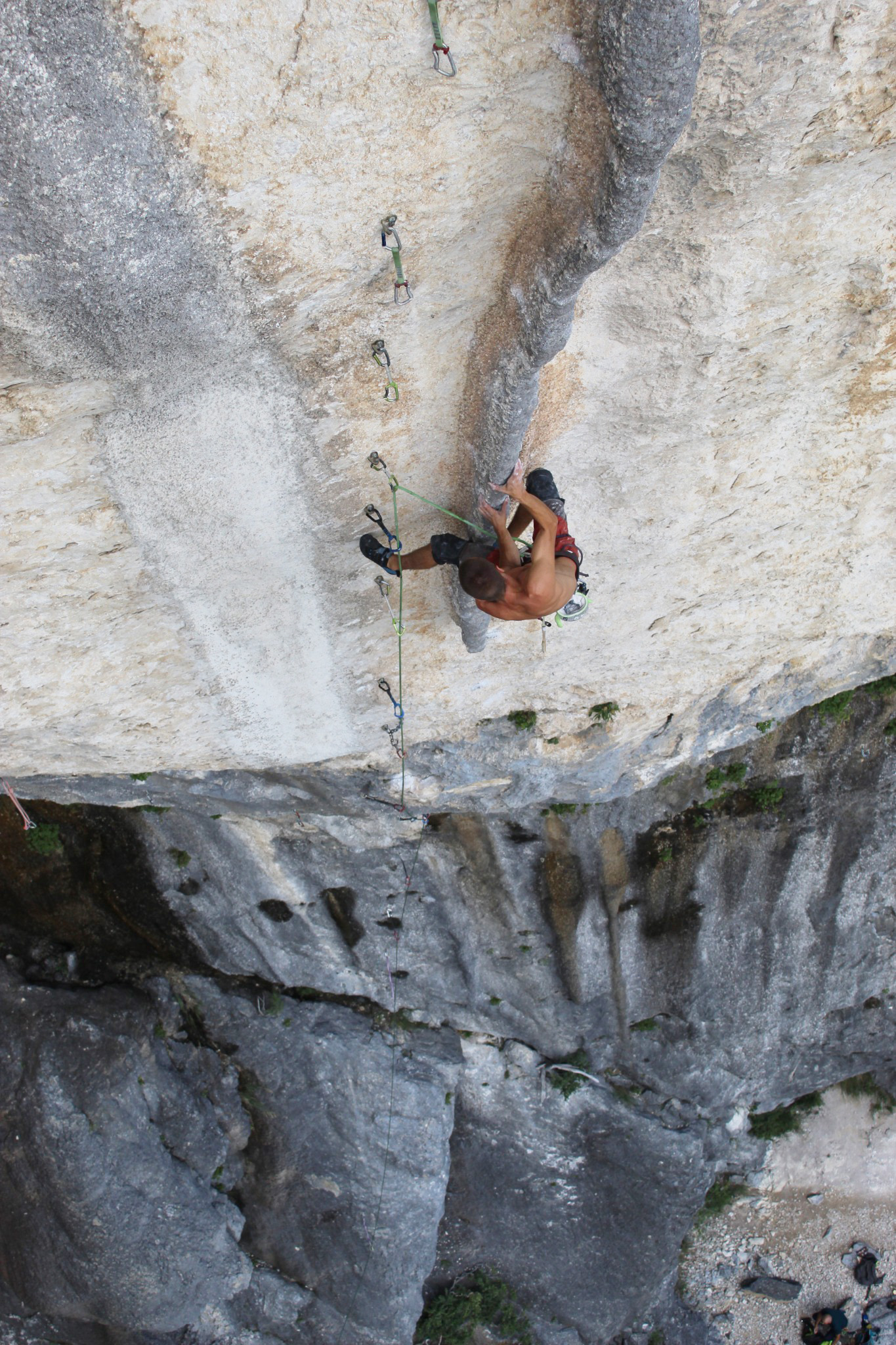
Climber leading the sport climbing route Hulkosaure 8b (5.13d). Quickdraws have already been attached to the line of pre-drilled bolts that mark the route.

Sport climbing is a form of free climbing (i.e. no artificial or mechanical device can be used to aid progression, which is in contrast with aid climbing) that is performed in pairs, where the lead climber clips into pre-drilled permanently fixed bolts on the rockface for their protection while ascending. The lead climber uses quickdraws to clip into the bolts. The second climber (also called the belayer) then removes the quickdraws as they climb the route after the lead climber has reached the top.

Sport climbing differs from traditional climbing which requires the lead climber to find places into which temporary and removable climbing protection equipment can be inserted as they simultaneously try to ascend the route—and thus sport climbing is a safer and less physically demanding way to ascend a climbing route. Sport climbing differs from free solo climbing where no climbing protection is used whatsoever.

Confusingly, the sport of competition climbing — which consists of three distinct rock climbing disciplines: lead climbing (the bolted sport-climbing element), bouldering (where no bolts or any protection is needed as the routes are very short), and speed climbing (where a top rope climbing format is used for protection) — is sometimes referred to as "sport climbing".

=== First free ascent ===
Sport climbing developed the redpoint as the definition of what constitutes a first free ascent (FFA), which became the definition of an FFA for all climbing disciplines. Redpointing allows for previously controversial techniques of hangdogging, headpointing, and pinkpointing (in competition lead climbing — the sport climbing component of competition climbing — and in extreme sport climbing, the quickdraws are pre-clipped to the bolts for simplicity, which is known as pinkpointing).

== History ==
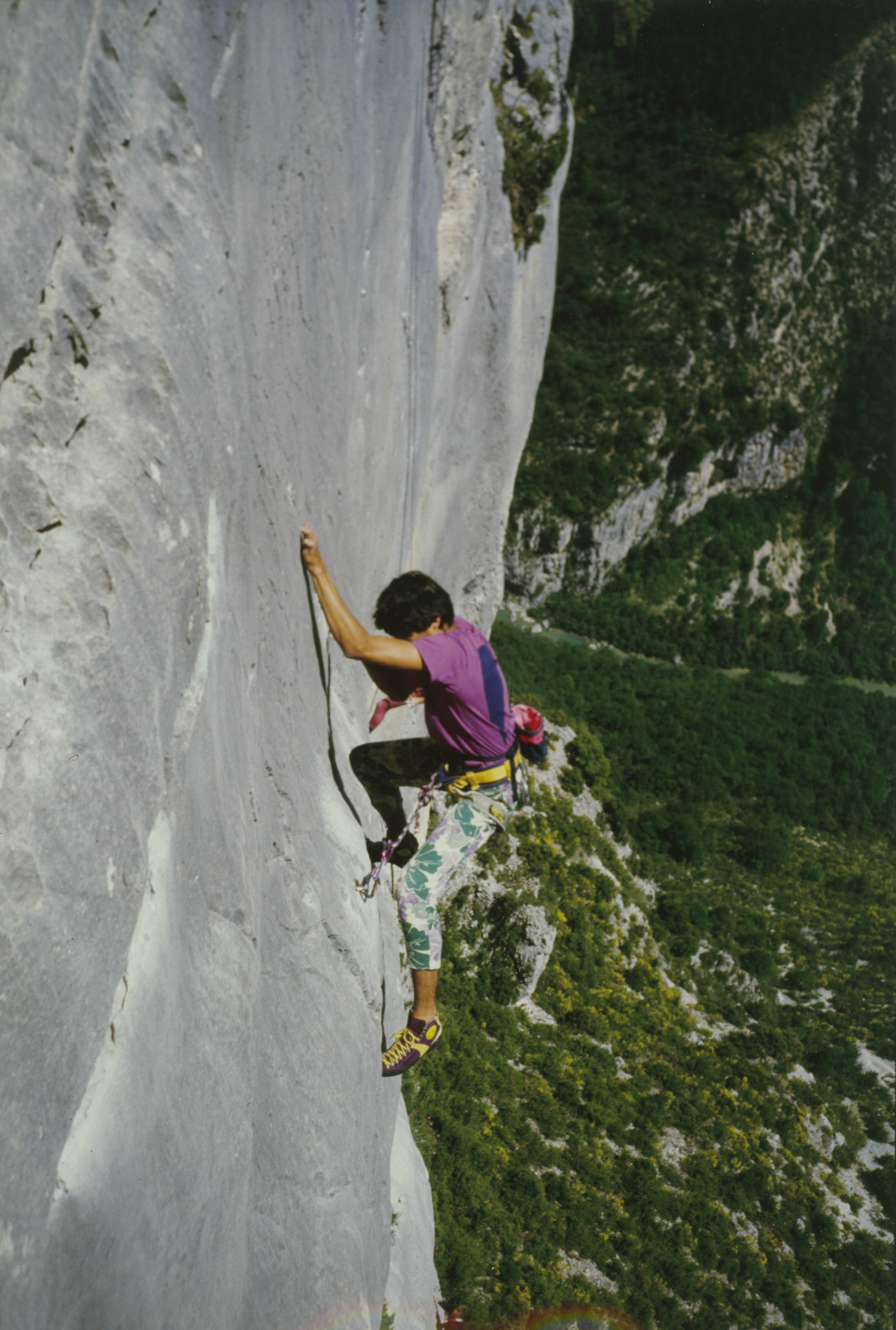
Climber on the famous 1981 multi-pitch bolted sport-climbing route, Surveiller et punir (7a+), Verdon Gorge, France.

By the early 1980s, the leading rock climbers were beginning to reach the limits of the existing traditional climbing protection equipment. They looked to climb the blanker face routes that did not have the usual cracks and fissures that are needed in which to place traditional climbing protection such as spring-loaded camming devices. In France, leading climbers such as Patrick Berhault and Patrick Edlinger began to pre-drill permanent bolts into the pocket-marked limestone walls of Buoux and Verdon Gorge for their protection. These became known as "sport climbing routes" — as there was none of the associated risks of traditional climbing, it was a purely sporting endeavor. Early notable examples of these sport-climbing routes include Pichenibule 7b+ (5.12c) in 1980. Around the same time at Smith Rock State Park in the United States, American climber Alan Watts also started to place pre-drilled bolts into routes, creating the first American sport climbs of Watts Tot 5.12b (7b), and Chain Reaction 5.12c (7b+) in 1983.

Sport climbing was rapidly adopted in Europe, and particularly in France and Germany by the then emerging professional rock climbers such as German climber Wolfgang Güllich and French brothers Marc Le Menestrel and Antoine Le Menestrel. The United Kingdom was more reluctant to allow bolting on natural rock surfaces, and early British sport climbers such as Jerry Moffatt and Ben Moon were forced to move to France and Germany. The bolting of external natural rock surfaces was also initially controversial in the US, although American sport climbing pioneer Alan Watts later recounted that American traditional climbers were as much against the "redpointing" techniques of sport climbers (i.e. continually practicing new routes before making the first free ascent), as they were against the use of bolts. Eventually, these sport climbers began to push new grade milestones far above traditional climbing grades, and the use of bolts on natural rock surfaces became more accepted in outdoor climbing areas across America and Europe.

=== Competition sport climbing ===
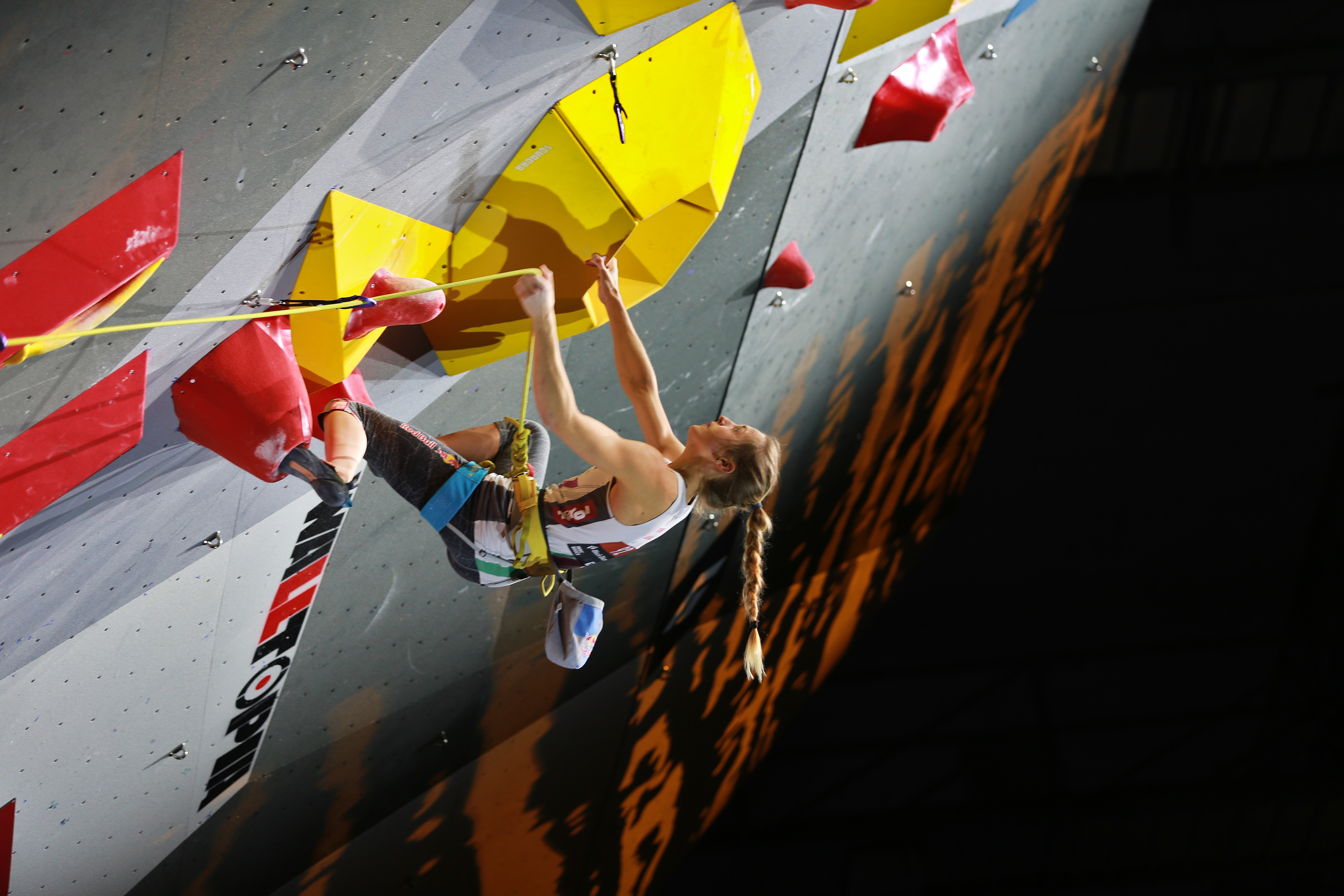
Jessica Pilz about to clip her rope into a pre-bolted hanging quickdraw in the final of the women's lead climbing event at the 2018 World Championships

The significantly safer aspect of sport climbing over traditional climbing led to rapid development in competition climbing in the 1980s, where competition lead climbing events were held on bolted routes. Climbing noted the importance of events such as the 1988 International Sport Climbing Championship at Snowbird, Utah, for introducing leading European sport climbers such as Edlinger and Jean-Baptiste Tribout to leading American traditional climbers such as Ron Kauk and John Bachar.

By the end of the 1990s, the UIAA (delegated to the International Council for Competition Climbing), and latterly the International Federation of Sport Climbing (IFSC), was regulating and organizing major international climbing competitions, including the annual IFSC Climbing World Cup, and the biennial IFSC Climbing World Championships. Competitive climbing includes sport climbing (which is competition lead climbing), and also competition bouldering and competition speed climbing.

== Ethics ==
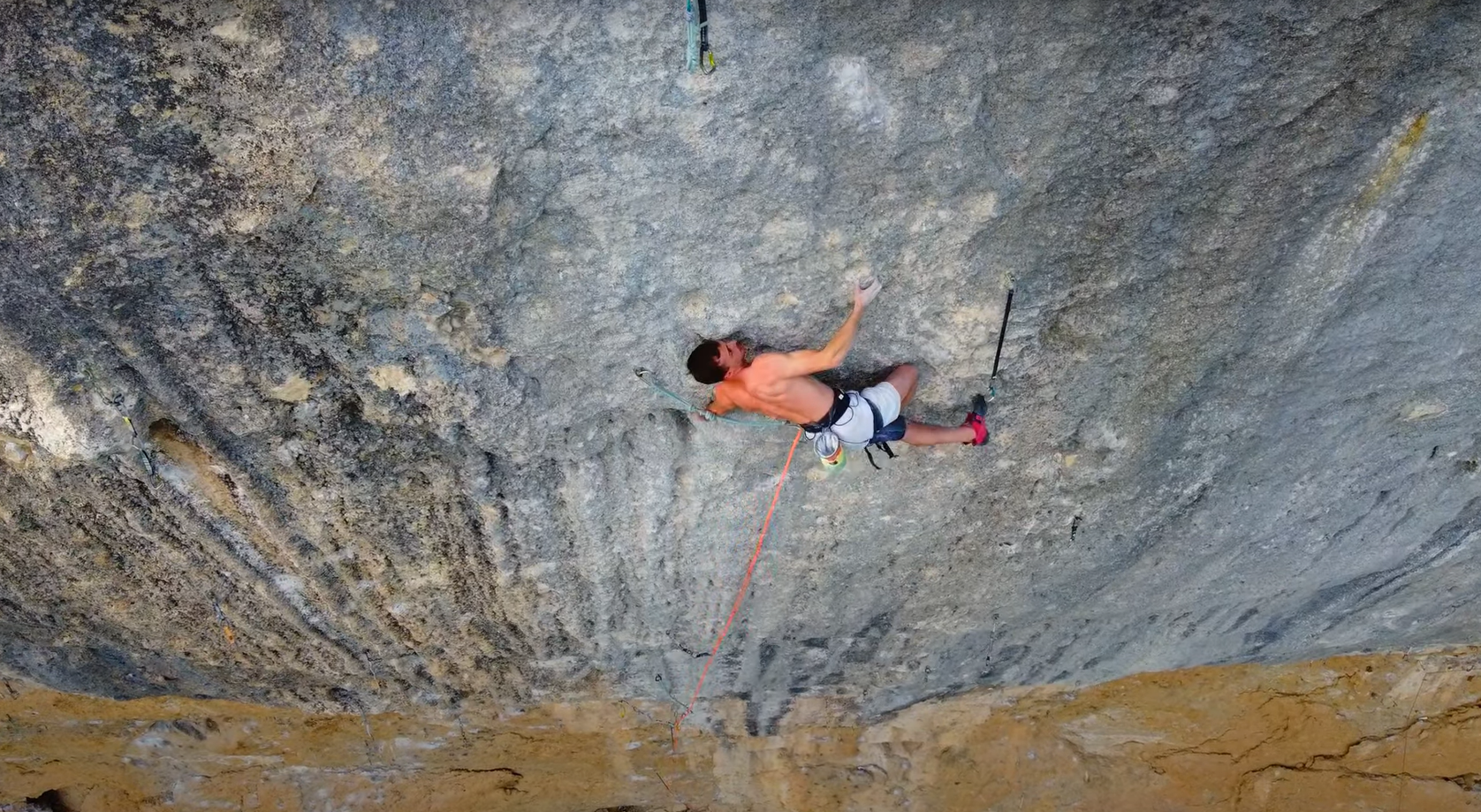
Moritz Welt on the extreme sport-climb, Joe Blau 8c+ (5.14c), in the fully bolted crag of Oliana, in Spain

Debates remain about the ethics of attaching permanent metal bolts on natural outdoor rock, which is also related to the broader clean climbing movement. Many climbing areas—particularly in Continental Europe (for example notable crags such as Oliana in Spain, and Ceuse in France)—have become fully bolted. However, many others remain emphatically non-bolted, such as Clogwyn Du'r Arddu in the United Kingdom, where only traditional climbing techniques are allowed, and attempts to make even very dangerous routes a little safer with even singular bolts (e.g. Indian Face) have been undone.

In the United Kingdom, the British Mountaineering Council (BMC) maintains a register of outdoor climbing areas that are suitable for bolting, and those which are to remain bolt free; in addition, the BMC offers guidance on bolting-related ethical climbing issues such as retro-bolting.

== Equipment ==
=== Quickdraws ===
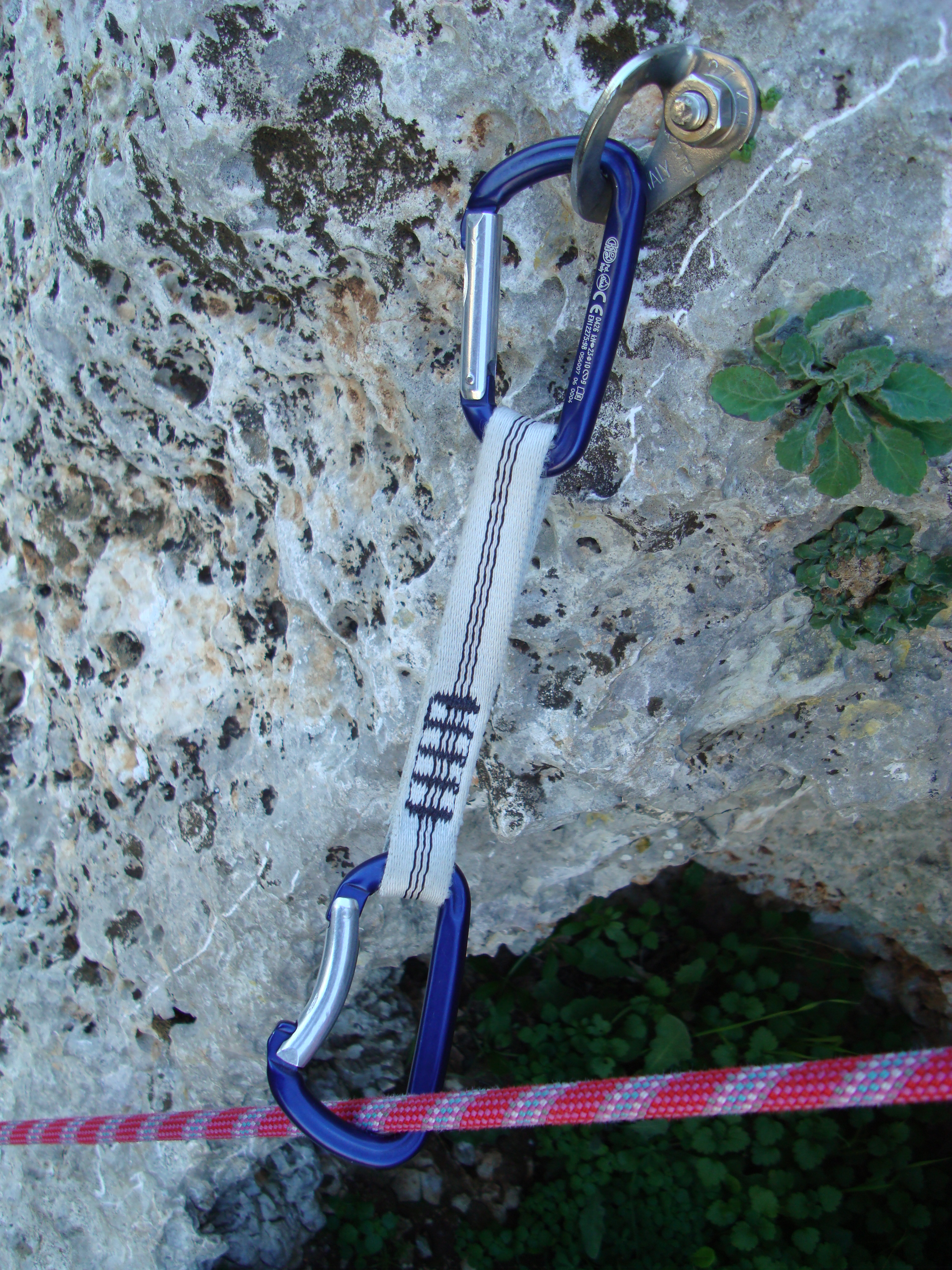
A rope clipped into a quickdraw, which is also clipped into a bolt

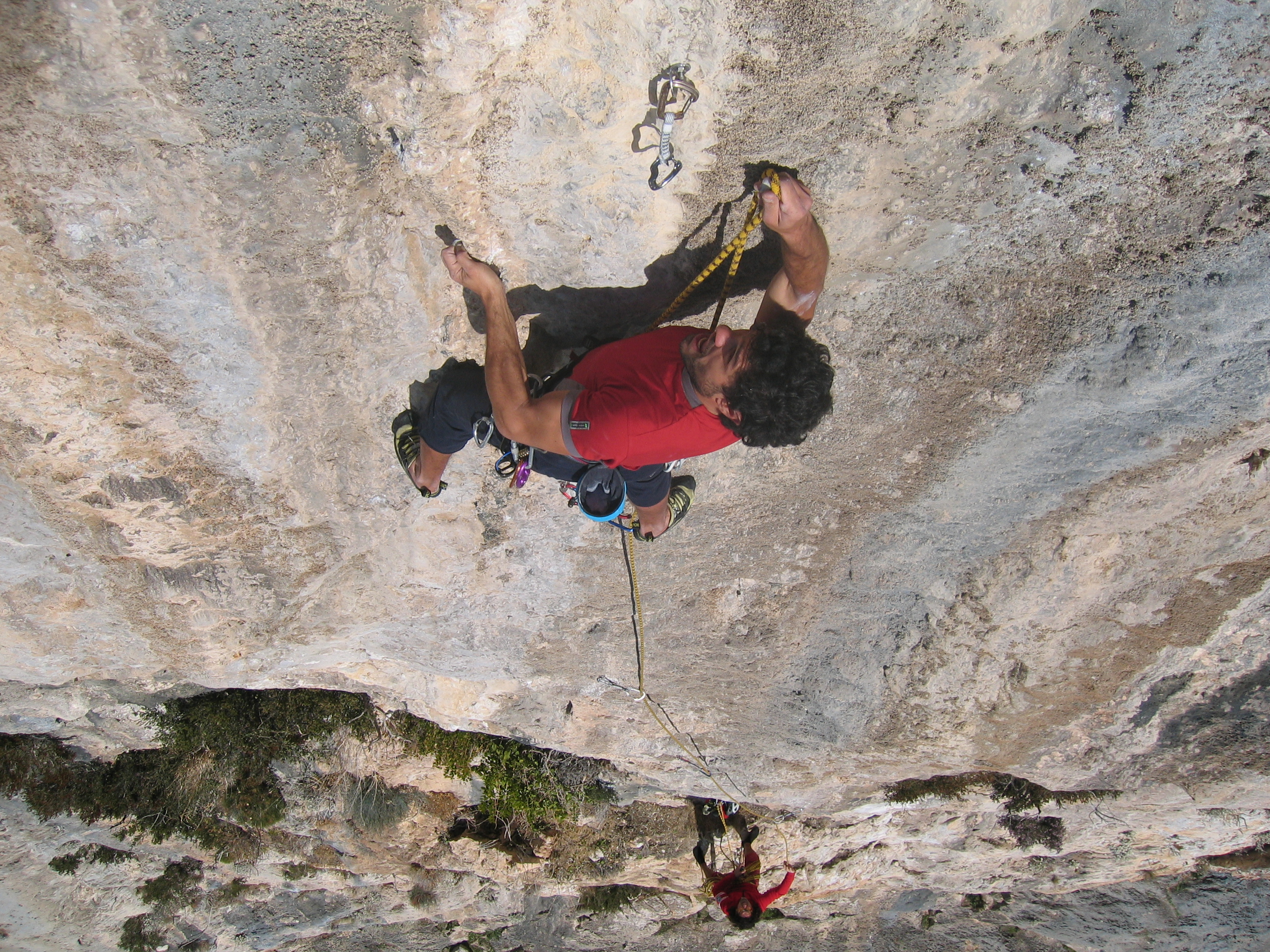
Sport-climber clipping their rope into a quickdraw that is hanging from a bolt, while lead-climbing on Cardiopalma 8a (5.13b)

Sport climbing requires far less rock climbing equipment than traditional climbing as the protection is already pre-drilled into the route. Aside from the standard equipment of lead climbing (e.g. a rope, belay device, harness, and climbing shoes), the only important other important pieces of equipment are quickdraws to clip the rope into the bolts without generating friction. On complex sport climbing routes that don't follow a straight line, the alignment and lengths of quickdraws used are important considerations to avoid rope drag.

=== Bolts ===
The pre-drilled bolts will degrade over time—particularly in coastal areas due to salt—and eventually, all sport climbs need to be re-fitted after several years. The highest quality titanium bolts are too expensive to use regularly, and the next highest quality stainless steel bolts have an expected lifespan of circa 20–25 years (the cheaper plated stainless steel bolts have a shorter span); and in 2015, the American Alpine Club established an "anchor replacement fund" to help replace the bolts on America's estimated 60,000 sport-climbing routes, however ageing bolts remain a problem in sport-climbing.

== Grading ==
=== Dominant systems ===
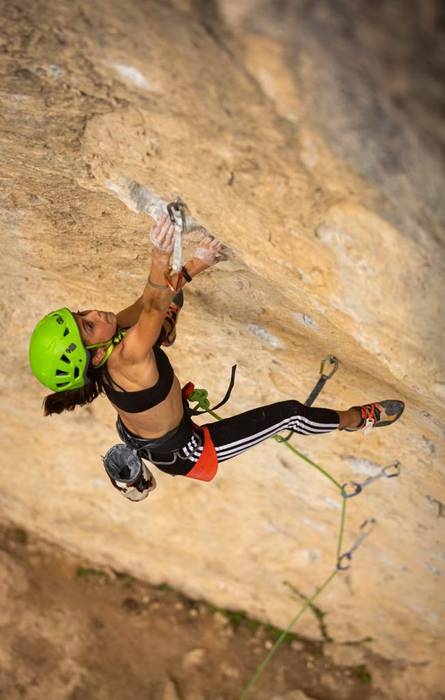
Ainhize Belar leading on Gezurren Erresuma (grade 8c, 5.14b, XI-), in Spain.

As sport climbing removes the danger of a route by using bolts, sport routes are graded solely for their technical difficulty (i.e. how hard are the physical movements to ascend the route), and unlike traditional climbing routes, do not require an additional grade to reflect risk. The dominant systems for grading sport-climbing routes are the French system (e.g. ... 6b, 6c, 7a, 7b, 7c, ...), which is also called French sport-grading, and the American system (e.g. ... 5.9, 5.10a, 5.10b, 5.10c, 5.10d, 5.11a, ...). The UIAA system (e.g. ... VII, VIII, IX, X, ...) is popular in Germany and central Europe. The Australian Ewbank system (e.g. ... , 23, 24, 25, 26, ...) is also used.

=== Integration with boulder grades ===
Even though the grading of sport-routes is simpler than traditional-routes, there is the issue of how to compare a short route with one very hard move, with a longer route with a sustained sequence of slightly easier moves. Most of the above grading systems are based on the "overall" difficulty of the route, and thus both routes could have the same sport grade. As a result of this, it has become common for the advanced sport-routes (e.g. Realization, La Dura Dura, and La Rambla) to describe the hardest moves by their bouldering grade, via the French "Font" system (e.g. ..., 7B, 7C, 8A, 8B, ...) or the American "V-scale" system (e.g. ..., V9, V10, V11, V12, ...). French sport-grades can be confused with French "Font" boulder grades—the only difference being 'capitalization'.

As an example of how sport and boulder grades are used on sport climbing routes, this is Adam Ondra describing his 2017 redpoint of Silence, the first-ever sport climb with a sport-grade of 9c (French), which is the same as 5.15d (American) or XII+ (UIAA):

The climb is about 45m long, the first 20m are about 8b [French sport] climbing with a couple of really really good knee-bars. Then comes the crux boulder problem, 10 moves of 8C [French boulder]. And when I say 8C boulder problem, I really mean it. ... I reckon just linking 8C [French boulder] into 8B [French boulder] into 7C [French boulder] is a 9b+ [French] sport climb, I'm pretty sure about that.

— Adam Ondra in an interview with PlanetMountain (2017).

== Notable climbs and climbers ==
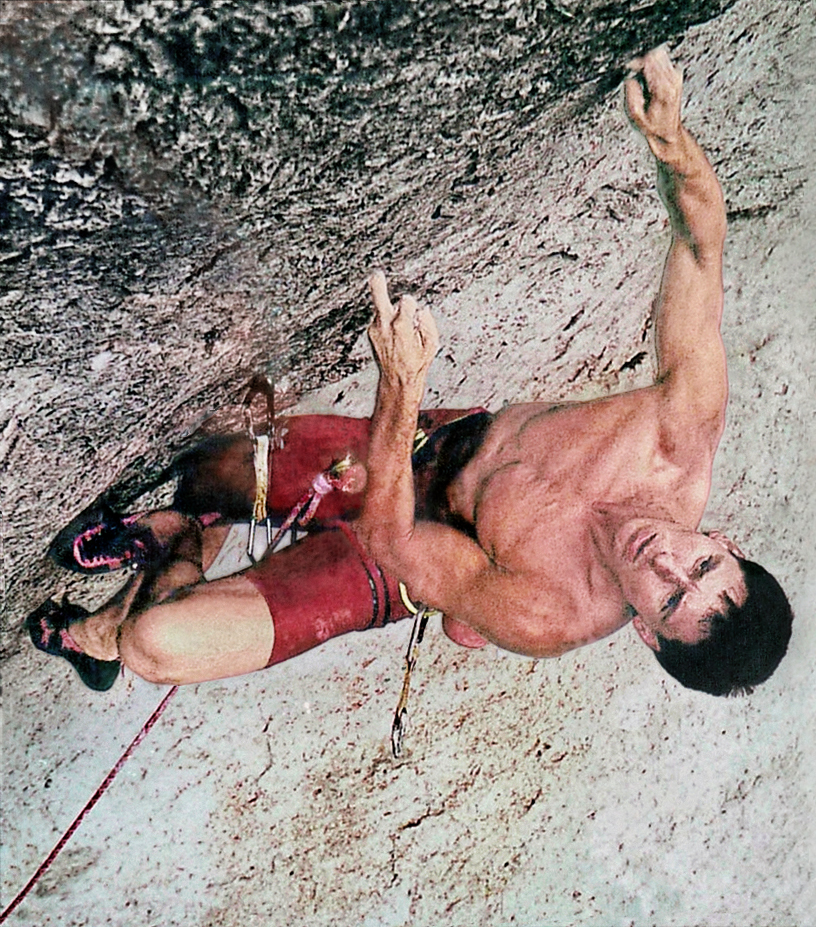
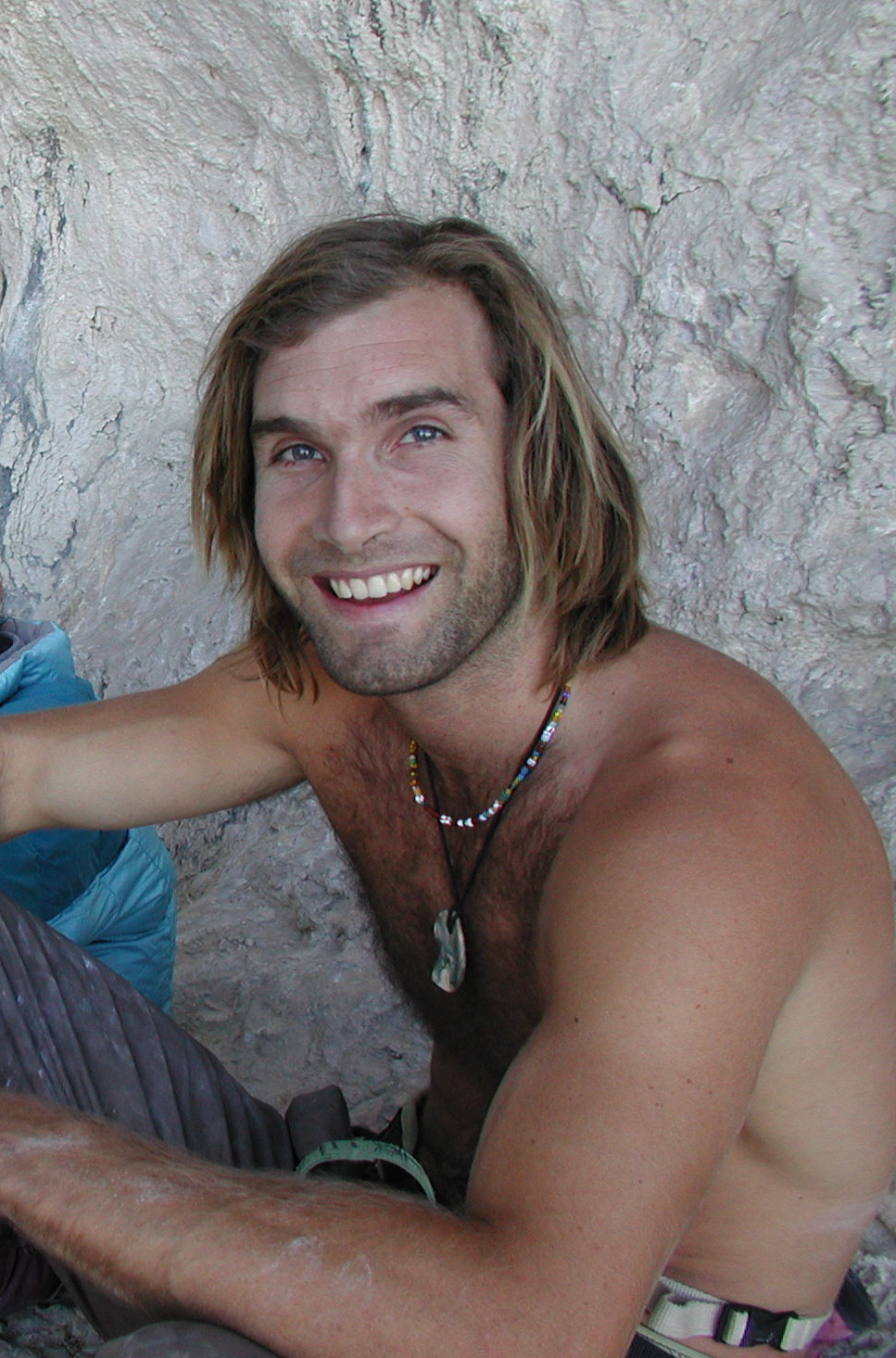
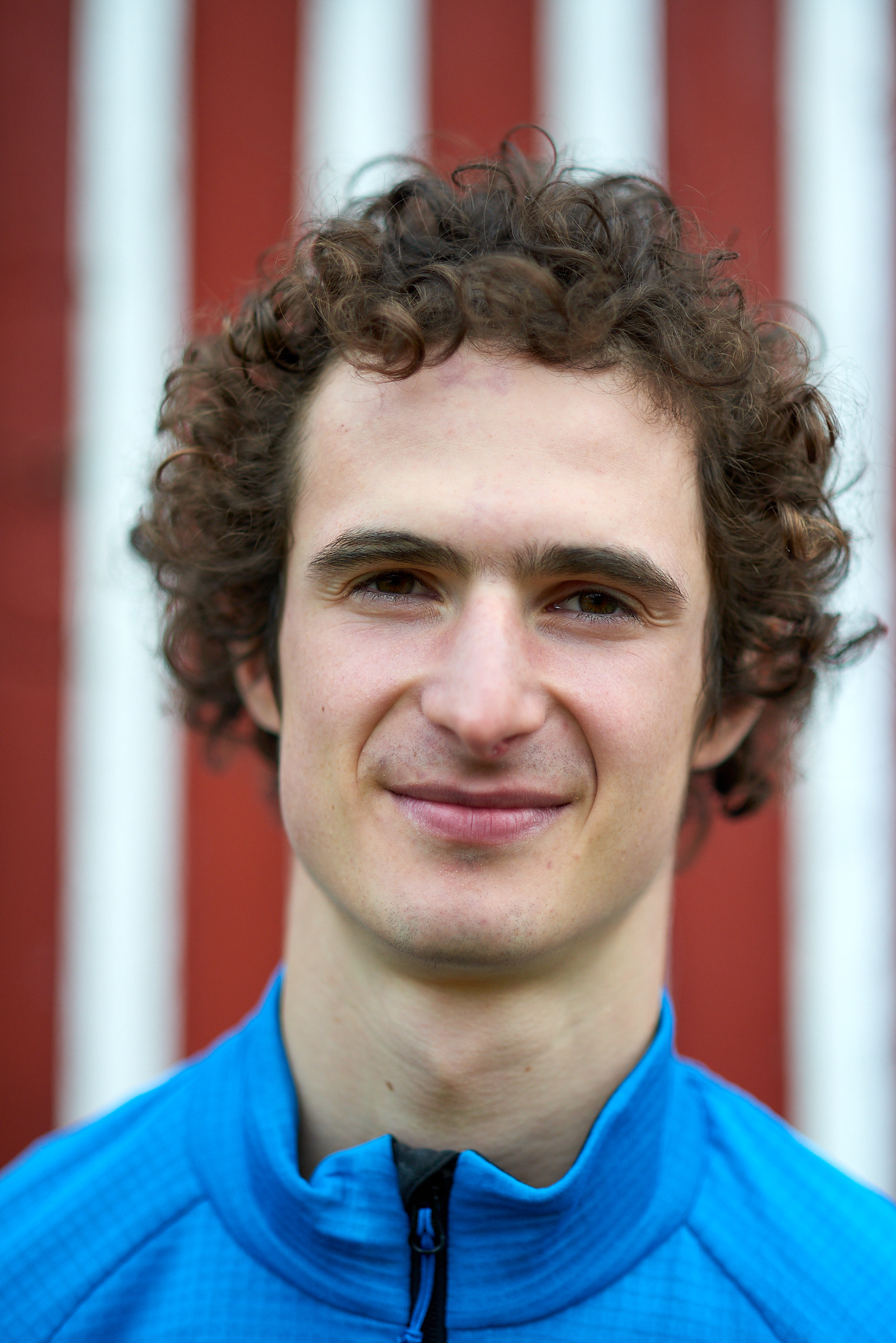
Some of the strongest-ever male sport climbers in history: Wolfgang Güllich (1980s), Chris Sharma (2000s), and Adam Ondra (2010s)

Since the development of sport climbing in the early 1980s, all of the subsequent grade milestones (i.e. the next levels of hardest technical difficulty) in rock climbing have been set by sport climbers. German climber Wolfgang Güllich raised sport climbing grades from 8b (5.13d) in 1984 with Kanal im Rücken to 9a (5.14d) in 1991 with Action Directe. American climber Chris Sharma dominated sport climbing development in the decade after his ground-breaking ascent of Realization/Biographie at 9a+ (5.15a) in 2001 and Jumbo Love at 9b (5.15b) in 2008. Czech climber Adam Ondra took the mantle of the world's strongest sport climber from Sharma by freeing Change in 2012 and La Dura Dura in 2013, both at 9b+ (5.15c). In 2017, Ondra freed Silence, the first-ever sport climb at 9c (5.15d).

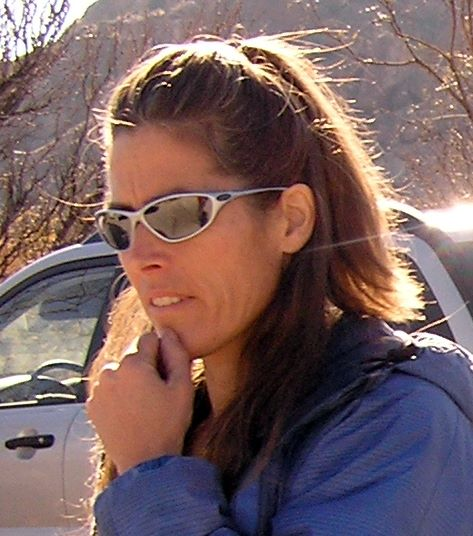
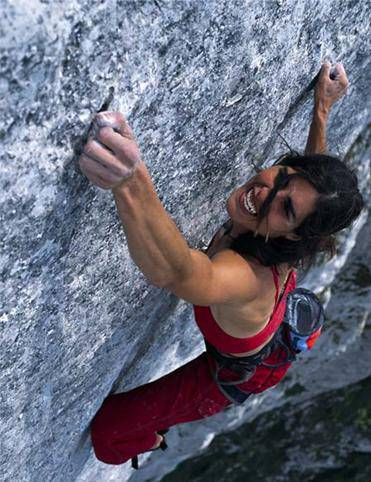
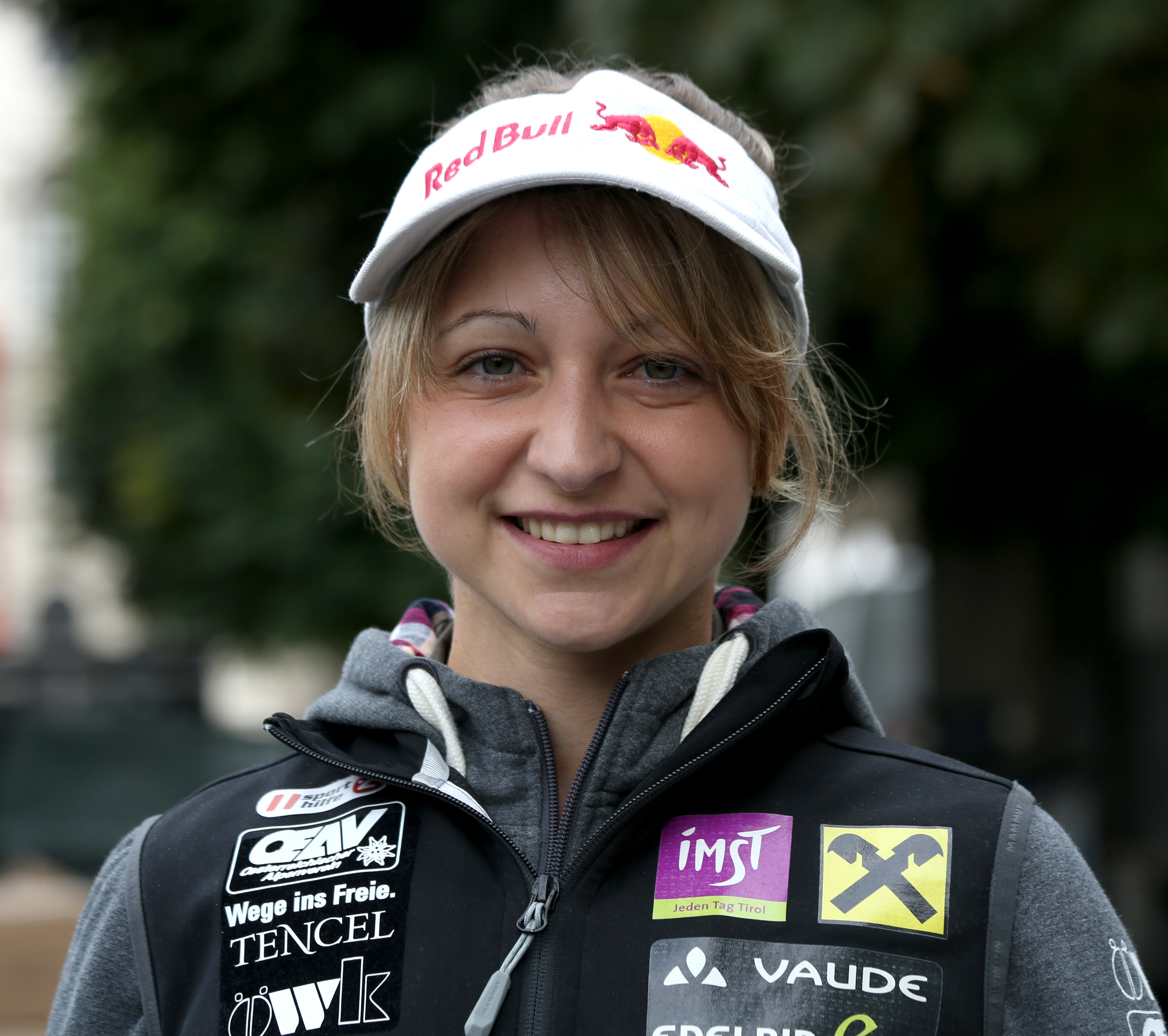
Some of the strongest-ever female sport climbers in history: Lynn Hill (1980s), Josune Bereziartu (2000s), and Angela Eiter (2010s)

Female sport climbing was dominated in the 1980s by American climber Lynn Hill and French climber Catherine Destivelle who set new female grade milestones and also competed against each other in the first climbing competitions. Spanish climber Josune Bereziartu dominated the setting of new grade milestones in female sport climbing in the late 1990s and early 2000s; her 2005 redpoint of Bimbaluna at 9a/9a+ was only a half-notch behind the highest male sport climbing route at the time, which was Realization/Biographie at 9a+. By 2017, Austrian climber Angela Eiter had broken into the 9b (5.15b) grade with La Planta de Shiva, and in 2020 made the first female free ascent of a 9b (5.15b) with Madame Ching. In 2020–21, Laura Rogora and Julia Chanourdie also climbed 9b (5.15b) sport routes. Brooke Raboutou climbed Excalibur 9b+ (5.15c) in Arco, Italy in 2025. Only a handful of male climbers have climbed at 9b+ (5.15c), and only Adam Ondra at 9c (5.15d).

Some of the strongest-ever sport climbers were also some of the strongest-ever competition climbers, such as Adam Ondra, Lynn Hill, and Angela Eiter. However, some of the other strongest-ever sport climbers either largely ignored competition climbing, or retired early from it to focus on non-competition sport climbing, such as Wolfgang Gullich, Chris Sharma, and Josune Bereziartu.

== In film ==
- Statement of Youth, a 2019 documentary film about the birth of sport climbing in Britain in the 1980s featuring Jerry Moffatt and Ben Moon.
- Reel Rock 7, the 2012 edition of the Reel Rock series with Chris Sharma and Adam Ondra's famous collaboration on La Dura Dura 9b+ (5.15c).
- Dosage Volume I, the 2002 edition of Dosage Series with Chris Sharma's historic first free ascent of Realization/Biographie 9a+ (5.15a).

== See also ==
- Aid climbing
- Free solo climbing
- Traditional climbing
