= Lobster clasp =

Type of jewelry fastener

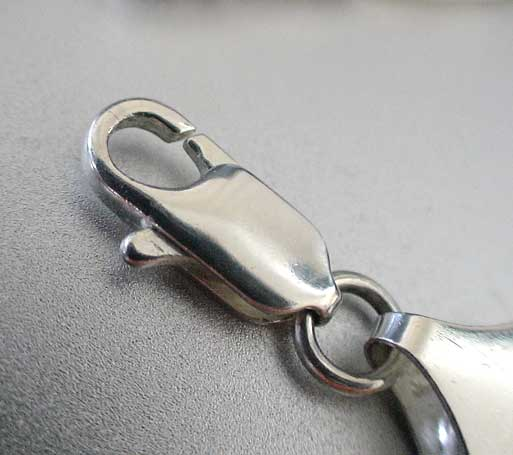
A silver lobster clasp, attached to a piece of jewelry, enlarged to show details

A lobster clasp, also known as a lobster hook, lobster claw, trigger clasp, or bocklebee clasp, is a fastener that is held closed by a spring. The lobster clasp is opened or closed by actuating a small lever, after which it is attached to (or removed from) a short link-chain or a ring-like structure. Lobster clasps are often used for necklaces, bracelets, and keychains.

Lobster clasps are named as such because of their "pinching" mechanism, and they are often shaped like a lobster's claw.

== See also ==
- Bolt snap
- Carabiner
