= Quickdraw =

Piece of climbing equipment used by rock and ice climbers

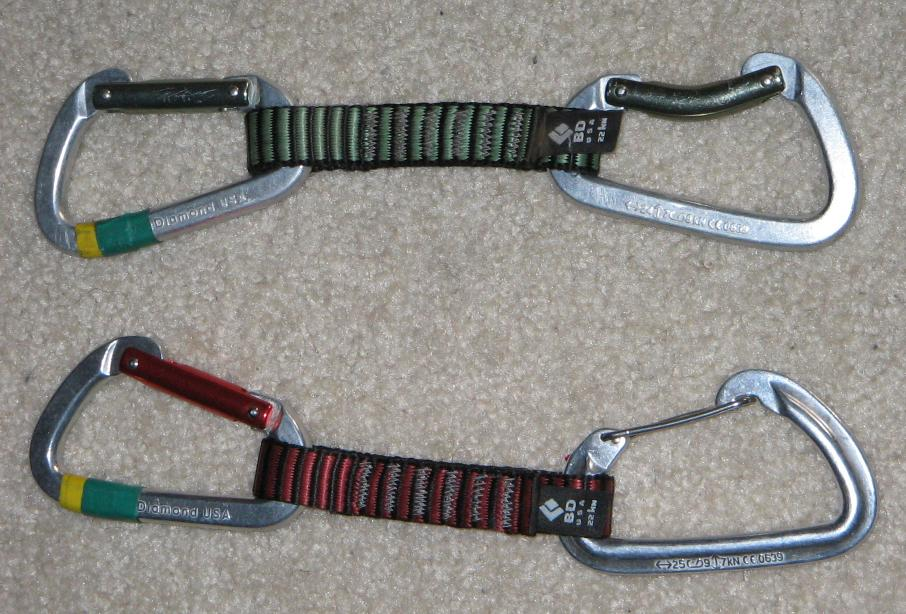
Two quickdraws. The upper has a solid bent gate for the rope and the lower a wire gate for it.

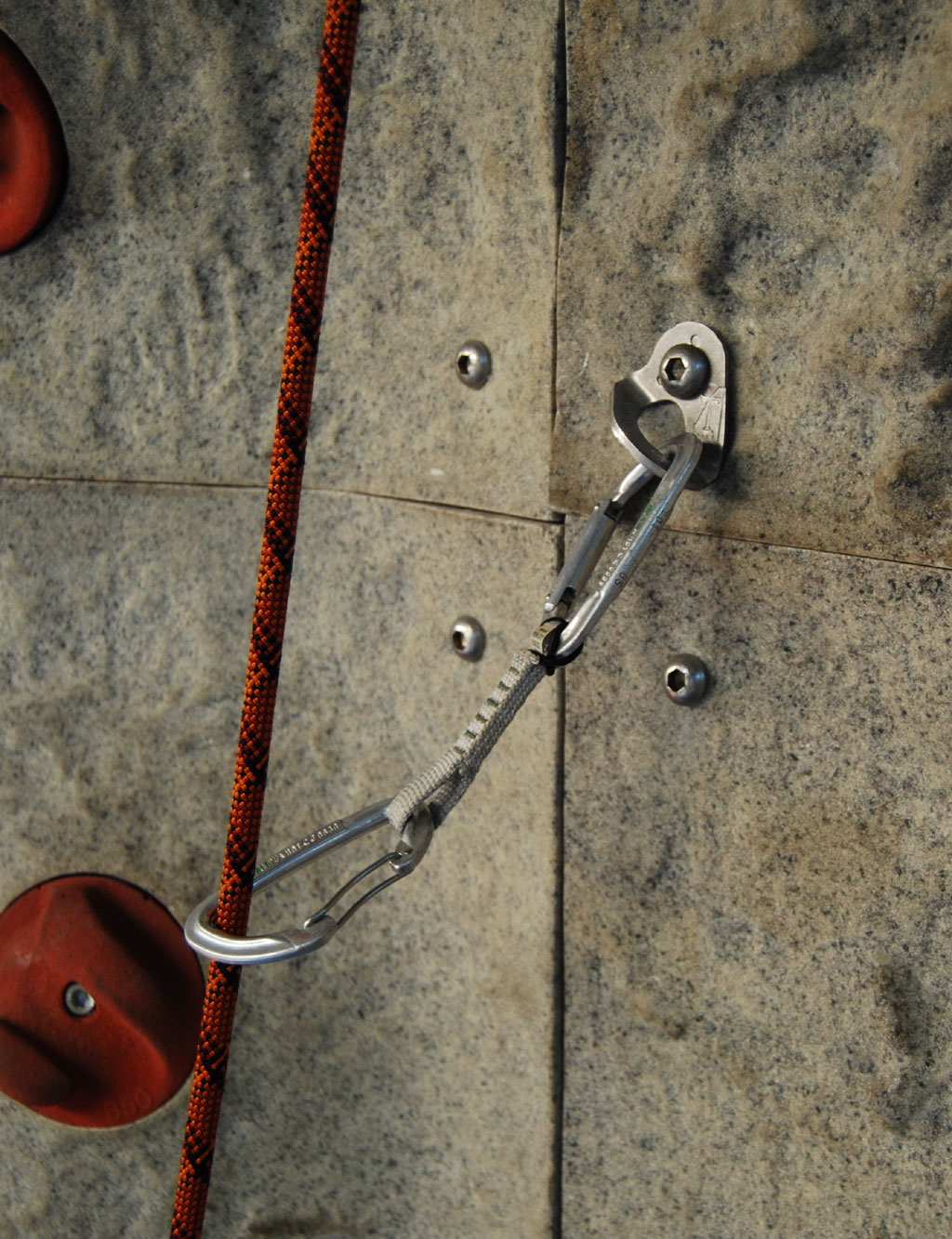

A quickdraw (also known as an extender) is a piece of climbing equipment used by rock and ice climbers to allow the climbing rope to run freely through protection such as bolt anchors or other traditional gear while leading.

A quickdraw consists of two carabiners connected by a semi-rigid material (sometimes called the "dogbone"). One carabiner has a straight gate and connects to an anchoring device. The other carabiner is for the climbing rope, and uses a bent gate. Quickdraws are manufactured with either a solid carabiner gate or a wire carabiner gate for their lighter weight.

== Use ==
A quickdraw is a specific type of runner. Runners are used by rock and ice climbers to extend the distance between an anchoring device and the rope.

A quickdraw is differentiated from a simple open loop of webbing with 2 carabiners on it by the following attributes:

1. The material that connects the 2 carabiners is semi-rigid. It is not as flexible as an open loop of webbing. This rigidity facilitates quicker clipping to an anchoring device.
2. The gate (on the carabiner that clips to a rope) is held in a specific orientation that facilitates quicker clipping to a rope.

These two attributes differentiate a quickdraw from other types of runners. These two attributes are what makes this special type of runner "quick" to "draw". If either of these two elements is missing the runner is not a "quickdraw".

The methods by which a quickdraw maintains gate orientation vary. The most popular method involves the use of an elastic polymer band around the outside of the point of connection between the carabiner and the semi-rigid material. The elastic band should only be installed on the rope-end, and not on the anchor end. The elastic band is not a load-bearing element, and the carabiner must pass through the dogbone to hold body weight. Incorrectly assembled quickdraws led to the death of Tito Traversa in 2013.

While historically the orientation of the gates varied, it is now generally recommended that both gates face the same direction, and that the quickdraw is clipped with both gates facing away from the climber's path. This lessens the chances of the carabiner getting "nose-hooked" and breaking, or of either carabiner unclipping, during a fall or due to rope drag.

== Permadraw ==
A permadraw is a quickdraw that is made from steel cable that has steel carabiners and remains permanently attached to the bolts. Developed in places such as Rifle Mountain Park in Colorado as a safer alternative; steel is much harder-wearing than the aluminum used in normal quickdraws. In addition, unlike quickdraws, climbers don't need to retrieve the permadraws at the end of a climb.

In indoor climbing gyms that offer wall space or lanes for lead climbing, permadraws are typically already placed on the wall with maillons.

== Alpine draw ==
Alpine quick draws feature long slings wrapped or folded multiple times to save space on a climbers harness in place of a dogbone. Alpine draws are often used to extend pieces of protection and reduce rope drag but may also be attached to the harness simply as a convenient way to store slings for other purposes, such as building an anchor or use in natural protection. The softer sling of an alpine draw may be considered superior to the stiffer dogbone of most quick draws as it causes less perturbation of traditional protection and may reduce the chance of the rope unclipping itself from the carabiner.
