= Handkerchief code =

Use of color-coded bandannas in the gay and BDSM communities

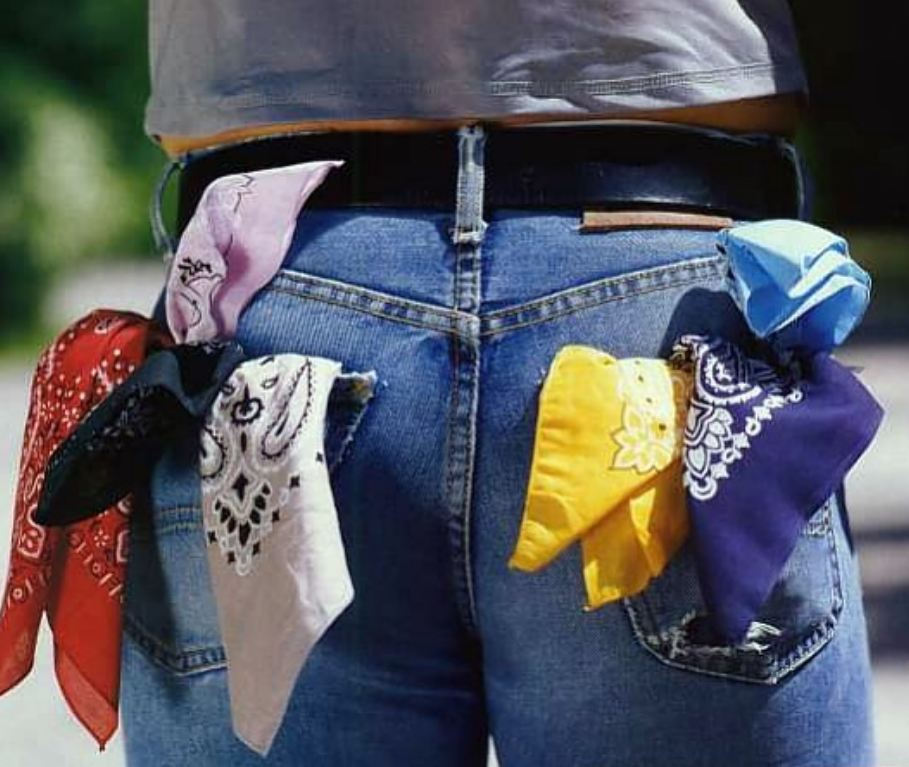
An assortment of handkerchiefs

The handkerchief code (also known as the hanky code, the bandana code, and flagging) is a system of color-coded cloth handkerchiefs or bandanas for non-verbally communicating one's interests in sexual activities and fetishes. The color of the handkerchief identifies a particular activity, and the pocket it is worn in (left or right) identifies the wearer's preferred role in that activity.

Wearing a handkerchief on the left side of the body typically indicates one is a "top" (considered active in the act or fetish indicated by the color of the handkerchief), while wearing it on the right side of the body would indicate one is a "bottom" (considered passive in it). For example, a dark blue handkerchief indicates an interest in anal sex, and wearing it in the left pocket indicates a preference for being the insertive partner.

The code was most widely used in the 1970s in the United States, Canada, Australia, and Europe, by gay and bisexual men seeking casual sex, or BDSM practitioners.

The handkerchief code shares many similarities with the Carabiner code used by woman loving women, but unlike the handkerchief code, the carabiner code is generally not used for communicating one's interest in kink(s).

== Origin ==
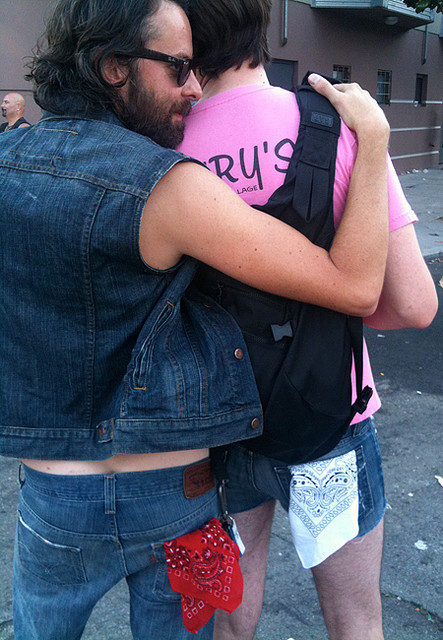
Hanky code

The wearing of colored bandanas around the neck as a practical accessory was common in the mid- and late-nineteenth century among cowboys, steam railroad engineers, and miners in the Western United States. It is thought that the wearing of bandanas by gay men originated in San Francisco after the Gold Rush, when, because of a shortage of women, men dancing with each other in square dances developed a code wherein the man wearing the blue bandana took the male part in the square dance, and the man wearing the red bandana took the female part (these bandanas were usually worn around the arm or hanging from the belt or in the back pocket of one's jeans).

The modern hanky code is often reported to have started in New York City around 1970, when a journalist for the Village Voice joked that instead of simply wearing a set of keys on one side or the other (then a common code to indicate whether someone was a "top" or a "bottom"), it would be more efficient to subtly announce their particular sexual focus by wearing different colored handkerchiefs. Other sources attribute the expansion of the original red–blue system into today's code to marketing efforts around 1971 by The Trading Post, a San Francisco department store for erotic merchandise, promoting handkerchiefs by printing cards listing the meanings of various colors.

Alan Selby, founder of Mr. S Leather in San Francisco, claimed that he created the first hanky code with his business partners at Leather 'n' Things in 1972, when their bandana supplier inadvertently doubled their order and the expanded code would help them sell the extra colors they had received.

Around 1980, Bob Damron's Address Book published a yearly chart for the meaning of each colored handkerchief.

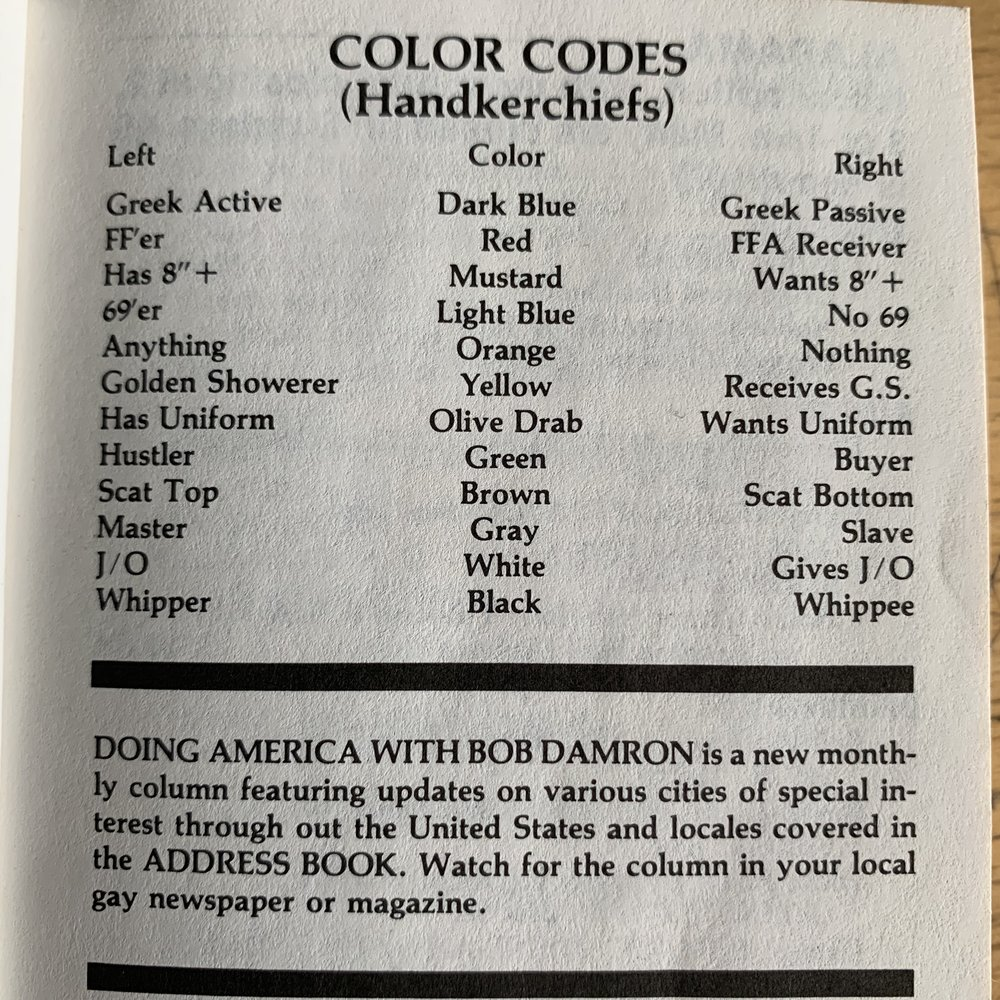
Color Codes from Bob Damron's Address Book (1980)

== Examples ==
There was no single authoritative standard for the code. This table is drawn from Larry Townsend's The Leatherman's Handbook II (the 1983 second edition; the 1972 first edition did not include this list) and is generally considered authoritative. Implicit in this list is the concept of left/right polarity, left as usual indicating the top, dominant, or active partner; right the bottom, submissive, or passive partner. Townsend noted that discussion with a prospective partner was still important because, people may wear a given color "only because the idea of the hankie turns them on" or "may not even know what it means".

Color	Meaning
Black	S&M
Blue (Dark)	Anal sex
Blue (Light)	Oral sex
Brown	Scat
Green	Hustler/prostitution
Grey	Bondage
Orange	Anything goes
Purple	Piercing
Red	Fisting
Yellow	Watersports

The longer lists found on the web are more elaborate and the many color codes in them are less often used in practice, although some of these colors are offered for sale at LGBT stores along with free cards listing their meanings.

== Modern use ==
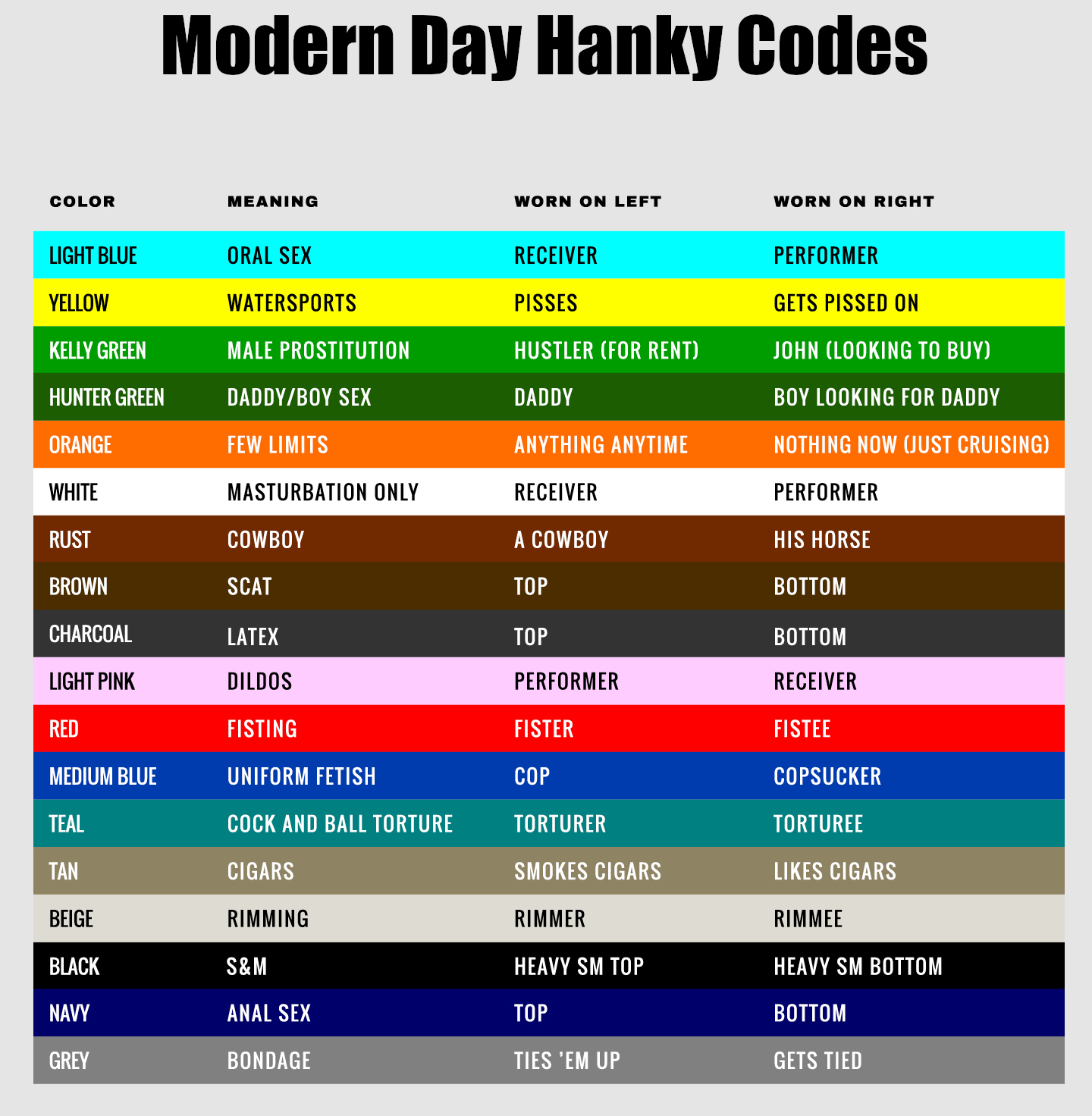
More modern hanky codes

The hanky code has recently undergone a revival and while the use of handkerchiefs may not be as prevalent, the hanky colours are a common consideration in the choice of leather and fetish gear colour. It should not, however, always be assumed this is the case and is best used as a conversation starter rather than a certain indication of sexual preferences.

The hanky code was a semiotic system of sexual advertising popular among the gay leather community of the United States and cruising scene more broadly. Social networking services may have replaced the use of hankies in cruising areas by digitizing the process. By using online platforms, men who have sex with men (MSM) can eliminate harassment and violence that they may face in public. Social networking services for MSM also allow for sub-groups, and for people to list fetishes, and what they are looking for, which is where the replacement of the need for hankies may have come from.

== See also ==
- Homosocialization
