= Carabiner code =

Use of carabiners in sapphic communities

The carabiner code is a method of non-verbally communicating one's romantic and/or sexual attraction used among lesbians, bisexual women, and the wider woman loving women community, involving the wearing of a carabiner as an accessory.

The side of the body the carabiner is worn on traditionally signals whether the wearer prefers to be a top, bottom, or switch during sexual activities. Wearing a carabiner on the left (from another’s perspective) signals the wearer is a bottom, wearing a carabiner on the right (from another’s perspective) signals the wearer is a top, and wearing a carabiner on both sides, or simply near the center, signals the wearer is a switch.

Carabiners are traditionally worn by hooking them through a belt loop on a pair of trousers or a skirt, but may be worn elsewhere on the body. Not everyone who participates in the tradition chooses to utilize their carabiner as an indicator of their role preference, as some wear a carabiner only to show they are interested in women. Not every person that wears a carabiner is necessarily participating in the code.

Carabiners can be left barren, but are often decorated further with accessories like chains or key hangers, used as a functional accessory for storing keys or other items, or used alongside rope in BDSM activities such as bondage or animal roleplay.

The carabiner code shares many similarities with the handkerchief code used by man loving men, but it is generally not used for communicating one's interest in kink(s).

== Origins ==
The carabiner code dates back to World War II, when more women in the United States began to work industrial jobs. At these work sites, the carabiner was a functional accessory and tool, and many working-class butch or otherwise masculine-presenting women started wearing them outside of work as fashion accessories to signal their status as lesbian, bisexual, or otherwise gender non-conforming.

One of the most famous documentations of the code was in Alison Bechdel's 2006 autobiographical memoir, Fun Home. In the book, she recounts spotting a "truck-driving bulldyke" wearing men's clothing and a carabiner on the belt loop of her trousers, and how it "sustained her" as a child.
