= Werner Munter =

Swiss mountain guide (born 1941)

Werner Munter (born 1941 in Lohnstorf, Switzerland) is a mountain guide, author and safety-expert for Alpine climbing.

== Life ==
Munter, who lives in Vernamiège near Sion, Switzerland, popularized the 'Halbmastwurf' as a belay hitch for climbing. American-English-speaking climbers know this knot as the Munter hitch, but in the United Kingdom it is more commonly known as the Italian hitch.

Munter became especially well known during the 1990s by his books on avalanches. These led to a shift of paradigm in the practical assessment of avalanches. The so-called '3 × 3 Filter- und Reduktionsmethode' is a probabilistic strategy of decision for winter mountaineers (especially ski mountaineers) for the assessment of avalanche risks in unprotected alpine areas. Munter's works triggered intensive discussions among mountaineers and mountain guides. Meanwhile, his 'Reduktionsmethode' (method of reduction) or similar decision strategies (Engler, DAV: Snowcard, Larcher/OeAV: Stop or Go) are now routinely taught by the Alpine Clubs (Alpenvereine).

As of 2005, Munter is employed at the 'Eidgenössisches Institut für Schnee- und Lawinenforschung' (Swiss institute for research on snow and avalanches) in Davos'.

In 1995, he was proclaimed 'Ehrenbergführer' (honorary mountain guide) by the Swiss association of mountain guides for his merits.

In 1997, he received the 'Eybl-Sicherheitspreis'.

== Published works (in German) ==
- 3×3 Lawinen - ISBN 3-7633-2060-1
- Berner Alpen - ISBN 3-7633-2415-1
- Bergsteigen I Bergwandern und Felsklettern - ISBN 3-444-50161-7
- Bergsteigen II Hochgebirgsklettern und Tourenskilauf - ISBN 3-444-50167-6

== Literature (in German) ==
- Beiträge zur strategischen Lawinenkunde: Berg&Steigen 4/2001 (Hrsg: OeAV)
