= Munter hitch =

Adjustable knot used to control friction in a belay system

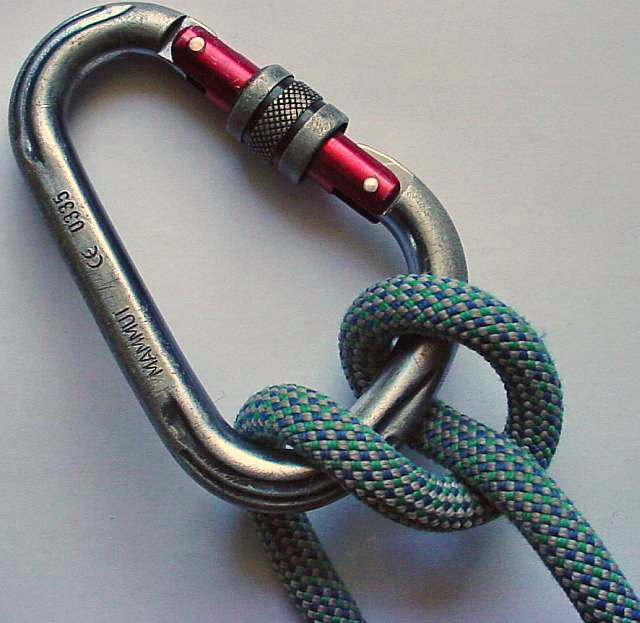
- Names: Munter hitch, HMS, Italian hitch, Flip-Flop knot, and the first part of the knot is formed in the same manner as the Crossing hitch (ABoK #1818, #1725, #1797)
- Category: Hitch
- Related: Half hitch, Zigzag Knot (ABoK #1195), Monster Munter
- Releasing: Non-jamming
- Typical use: Belaying
- Caveat: Wears out the rope when used for descending

The Munter hitch, also known as the Italian hitch, mezzo barcaiolo is a simple adjustable knot, commonly used by climbers, cavers, and rescuers to control friction in a life-lining or belay system. It is often mistakenly identified as the crossing hitch, however in the cross hitch the line does not return along its original path. To climbers, this hitch is also known as HMS, the abbreviation for the German term Halbmastwurfsicherung, meaning half clove hitch belay. This technique can be used with a special "pear-shaped" HMS locking carabiner, or any locking carabiner wide enough to take two turns of the rope.

In the late 1950s, three Italian climbers, Mario Bisaccia, Franco Garda and Pietro Gilardoni developed a new belay technique called the "Mezzo Barcaiolo" (MB) meaning; "a half of the knot, which is used by the sailors to secure a boat to a bollard in a harbor." The "MB" came to be known as the Munter hitch after Werner Munter, a Swiss mountain guide popularized its use in mountaineering in the 1970s. This hitch was studied and then promoted for its use in the mountains (being officially recognized by the UIAA towards the end of the sixties), by the Italian Alpine Club and, in particular, by its Central Commission for Materials and Techniques.

The hitch is simply a set of wraps using a rope or cord around an object, generally a round object like a pipe, pole or more commonly, a carabiner. Its main use is as a friction device for controlling the rate of descent in belay systems.

== Method of operation ==
The Munter hitch creates friction by having the rope rub on itself and on the object it has been wrapped around. There is no localized abrasion on any part of the rope as it is a continuously moving hitch. One very useful aspect of the Munter is its reversibility; it can be pulled from either side of the rope and it still works just as effectively. The Munter hitch is a self regulating hitch. The heavier the load the tighter the bends in the hitch become and therefore creating more friction and self regulating.

== Use for rappeling ==
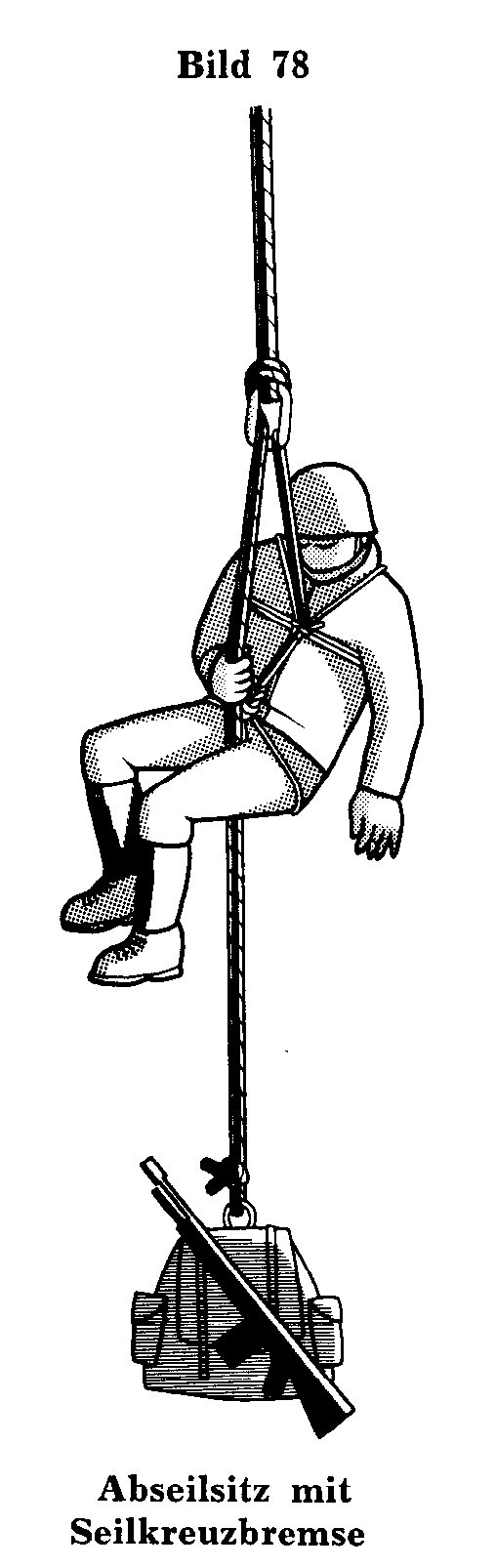
A soldier abseiling with a Munter hitch, depicted in a German military publication from 1966.

This hitch can be used to rappel or abseil down a vertical or semi-vertical wall, although it is not recommended as it causes severe twisting of the rope. Proper training should be undertaken before using the Munter hitch to rappel. Using this method to rappel is very hard on rope because of the rope on rope contact and is generally considered an emergency option only.

=== Use as load releasable tie off ===
As with most belay devices and some hitches the Munter can be tied off to maintain tension in a manner which is easily released under tension, often referred to as a Munter-Mule-Overhand or MMO.

The control rope (the rope not going to the load) is tied to the load rope with a mule knot (aka halter hitch) – not a noose (slipped overhand) – and the bight (loop) that sticks out is tied in an overhand around the load rope. A carabiner is then sometimes clipped through the end of the bight and around the load rope.

Examples of when a tie off would be employed include:

- tensioning the line for use as a track line
- fall restraint line
- restraining/guying purposes.

When a belayer needs to transfer the load from their harness to the anchor to escape the system: a rope grab (mechanical or friction knot/Prusik) is placed on the load line towards the load, rope is terminated on the rope grab (or the tails of accessory cord are used when using a cordelette with a Prusik as a rope grab) and runs back to the anchor where a Munter mule is tied under tension. The load can then be lowered (transferred) from the original belay onto the Munter Mule via the rope grab. The new line is often consider independent of the safety system so the original belay needs to be maintained throughout the process and secured back to the anchor before the system can be left unattended.

== Use as a belay ==
A belay system incorporating the Munter hitch is the same as any other belay system, which incorporates a belayer to tend the rope and an anchor, which secures the belay system and belayer.

There are several advantages to the Munter hitch. It requires no additional hardware other than a carabiner. It is also the most common belay system which locks with the brake hand in line with the load, and as such is a more suitable method for direct belays than using a normal belay plate. This can be useful when the anchor, carabiner and Munter hitch are above or behind the belayer whilst attention is paid to the loaded end of the rope. It can also more effectively dissipate heat than a belay device because no two surfaces of the rope are in contact with each other for more than an instant.

However, it places more bends in a rope than other belay methods, and creates significantly more friction on the outer sheath. Another disadvantage is that it can introduce significant twists to the rope. It is a versatile knot to know and can be used for full rope length vertical descents without the need for gloves.

The friction of the rope against the screw on the carabiner can cause the screw to undo and the carabiner to open, potentially weakening the strength of the carabiner, or allowing the rope to escape the carabiner completely. Therefore the hitch has to be tied correctly with the braking end on the opposite side of the carabiner than the gate is.

== Military use ==
The Munter hitch is taught on Australian military roping courses as a simple and effective method for descending steep or overhanging terrain with combat equipment and can also be used for lowering heavy stores or casualties, the only equipment required being a harness or webbing seat, a locking carabiner, and a rope.

== Arboreal usage ==
For the recreational tree climber or working arborist, the Munter is useful to know as a reliable lowering knot for moderate loads. This hitch performs well on both 16 strand arborist climbing lines and the 11 mm double braid lines.

== Tower technicians ==
Tower technicians also use this knot for lowering loads, and tagging heavy loads while hoisting. It is commonly referred to in the tower industry as a tag knot.

== Kite flying ==
Kite flyers use the Munter hitch to let a lifter kite ascend in a controlled manner in stronger winds. This helps prevent a long-line launch, during which significant forces are exerted on both the lifter kite and the line. In the same way, the Munter hitch can be used to raise or lower "line laundry" along the lifter line in a controlled manner.

== See also ==
- List of knots
