= Carabiner =

Shackle with a spring-loaded gate

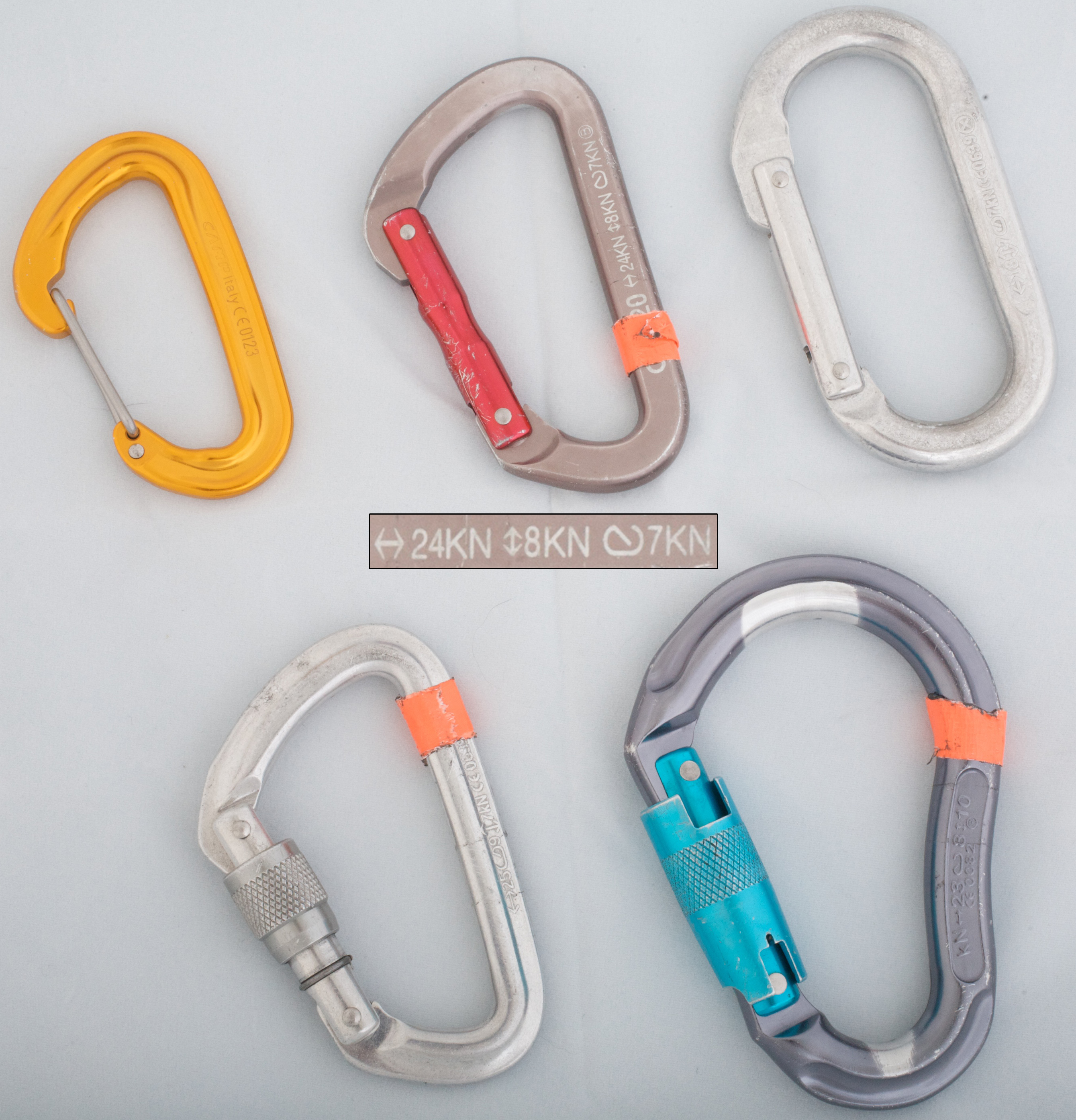
Clockwise from top left: D-shaped wire gate; D-shaped straight gate; oval straight gate; pear-shaped auto locker; D-shaped screw locker.; Center is a standard carabiner rating.

Using a carabiner to connect to a rope

A carabiner or karabiner (/ˌkærəˈbiːnər/), often shortened to biner or to crab, colloquially known as a (climbing) clip, is a specialized type of shackle, a metal loop with a spring-loaded gate used to quickly and reversibly connect components, most notably in safety-critical systems. The word comes from the German Karabiner, short for Karabinerhaken, meaning "carbine hook," as the device was used by carabiniers to attach their carbines to their belts.

== Use ==
Carabiners are widely used in rope-intensive activities such as climbing, fall arrest systems, arboriculture, caving, sailing, hot-air ballooning, rope rescue, construction, industrial rope work, window cleaning, whitewater rescue, and acrobatics. They are predominantly made from both steel and aluminium. Those used in sports tend to be of a lighter weight than those used in commercial applications and rope rescue.

Often referred to as carabiner-style or as mini-carabiners, carabiner keyrings and other light-use clips of similar style and design have also become popular. Most are stamped with a "not for climbing" or similar warning since they are not load-tested.

While any metal link with a spring-loaded gate is technically a carabiner, the strict usage among the climbing community specifically refers only to devices manufactured and tested for load-bearing in safety-critical systems like rock and mountain climbing, typically rated to 20 kN or more.

Carabiners on hot-air balloons are used to connect the envelope to the basket and are rated at 2.5, 3, or 4 tonnes.

Load-bearing screw-gate carabiners are used to connect the diver's umbilical to the surface supplied diver's harness. They are usually rated for a safe working load of 5 kN or more (equivalent to a weight in excess of approximately 500 kg).

== Types ==
=== Shape ===
Carabiners come in four characteristic shapes:

1. Oval: Symmetric. Most basic and utilitarian. Smooth regular curves are gentle on equipment and allow easy repositioning of loads. Their greatest disadvantage is that a load is shared equally on both the strong solid spine and the weaker gated axis. Often preferred type for racking biners due to their symmetric shape.
2. D: Asymmetric shape transfers the majority of the load on to the spine, the carabiner's strongest axis.
3. Offset-D: Variant of a D with a greater asymmetry, allowing for a wider gate opening.
4. Pear/HMS: Wider and rounder shape at the top than offset-D's, and typically larger. Used for belaying with a munter hitch, and with some types of belay device. The largest HMS carabiners can also be used for rappelling with a munter hitch (the size is needed to accommodate the hitch with two strands of rope). These are usually the heaviest carabiners.

=== Locking mechanisms ===
Carabiners fall into three broad locking categories: non-locking, manual locking, and auto locking.

==== Non-locking ====
Non-locking carabiners (or snap-links) have a sprung swinging gate that accepts a rope, webbing sling, or other hardware. Rock climbers frequently connect two non-locking carabiners with a short length of webbing to create a quickdraw (an extender).

Two gate types are common:

1. Solid gate: The more traditional carabiner design, incorporating a solid metal gate with separate pin and spring mechanisms. Most modern carabiners feature a 'key-lock nose shape and gate opening, which is less prone to snagging than traditional notch and pin design. Most locking carabiners are based on the solid gate design.
2. Wire gate: A single piece of bent spring-steel wire forms the gate. Wire gate carabiners are significantly lighter than solid gates, with roughly the same strength. Wire gates are less prone to icing up than solid gates, an advantage in Alpine mountaineering and ice climbing. The reduced gate mass makes their wire bales less prone to "gate flutter", a dangerous condition created when the carabiner suddenly impacts rock or other hard surfaces during a fall, and the gate opens momentarily due to momentum (and both lowers the breaking strength of the carabiner when open, and potentially allows the rope to escape). Simple wiregate designs feature a notch that can snag objects (similar to original solid gate designs), but newer designs feature a shroud or guide wires around the "hooked" part of the carabiner nose to prevent snagging.

Both solid and wire gate carabiners can be either "straight gate" or "bent gate". Bent-gate carabiners are easier to clip a rope into using only one hand, and so are often used for the rope-end carabiner of quickdraws and alpine draws used for lead climbing.

==== Locking ====
Locking carabiners have the same general shape as non-locking carabiners, but have an additional mechanism securing the gate to prevent unintentional opening during use. These mechanisms may be either threaded sleeves ("screw-lock"), spring-loaded sleeves ("twist-lock"), magnetic levers ("Magnetron"), other spring loaded unlocking levers or opposing double spring loaded gates ("twin-gate").

===== Manual =====
- Screw-lock (or screw gate): Have a threaded sleeve over the gate which must be engaged and disengaged manually. They have fewer moving parts than spring-loaded mechanisms, are less prone to malfunctioning due to contamination or component fatigue, and are easier to employ one-handed. They, however, require more total effort and are more time-consuming than pull-lock, twist-lock or lever-lock.

===== Auto-locking =====
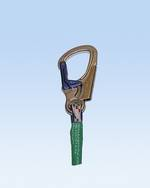
Carabiner with multiple combined auto lock and quick release, useful in via ferrata and arborist work, where two lanyards and carabiners are used

- Twist-lock, push-lock, twist-and-push-lock: Have a security sleeve over the gate which must be manually rotated and/or pulled to disengage, but which springs automatically to locked position upon release. They offer the advantage of re-engaging without additional user input, but being spring-loaded are prone to both spring fatigue and their more complex mechanisms becoming balky from dirt, ice, or other contamination. They are also difficult to open one-handed and with gloves on, and sometimes jam, getting stuck after being tightened under load, and being very hard to undo once the load is removed.
- Multiple-levers: Having at least two spring loaded levers that are each operated with one hand.
- Magnetic: Have two small levers with embedded magnets on either side of the locking gate which must be pushed towards each other or pinched simultaneously to unlock. Upon release the levers pull shut and into the locked position against a small steel insert in the carabiner nose. With the gate open the magnets in the two levers repel each other so they do not lock or stick together, which might prevent the gate from closing properly. Advantages are very easy one-handed operation, re-engaging without additional user input and few mechanical parts that can fail.
- Double-Gate: Have two opposed overlapping gates at the opening which prevent a rope or anchor from inadvertently passing through the gate in either direction. Gates may only be opened by pushing outwards from in between towards either direction. The carabiner can therefore be opened by splitting the gates with a fingertip, allowing easy one hand operation. The likelihood of a rope under tension to split the gates is therefore practically none. The lack of a rotating lock prevents a rolling knot, such as the Munter hitch, from unlocking the gate and passing through, giving a measure of inherent safety in use and reducing mechanical complexity.

== Certification ==
=== Europe ===
- Recreation: Carabiners sold for use in climbing in Europe must conform to standard EN 12275:1998 "Mountaineering equipment – Connectors – Safety requirements and test methods", which governs testing protocols, rated strengths, and markings. A breaking strength of at least 20 kN (20,000 newtons = approximately 2040 kilograms of force which is significantly more than the weight of a small car) with the gate closed and 7 kN with the gate open is the standard for most climbing applications, although requirements vary depending on the activity. Carabiners are marked on the side with single letters showing their intended area of use, for example, K (via ferrata), B (base), and H (for belaying with an Italian or Munter hitch).
- Industry: Carabiners used for access in commercial and industrial environments within Europe must comply with EN 362:2004 "Personal protective equipment against falls from a height. Connectors." The minimum gate closed breaking strength of a carabiner conforming with EN 362:2004 is nominally the same as that of EN 12275:1998 at around 20 kN. Carabiners complying with both EN 12275:1998 and EN 362:2004 are available.

=== United States ===
- Climbing and mountaineering: Minimum breaking strength (MBS) requirements and calculations for climbing and mountaineering carabiners in the USA are set out in ASTM Standard F1774. This standard calls for a MBS of 20 kN on the long axis, and 7 kN on the short axis (cross load).
- Rescue: Carabiners used for rescue are addressed in ASTM F1956. This document addresses two classifications of carabiners, light use and heavy-duty. Light use carabiners are the most widely used, and are commonly found in applications including technical rope rescue, mountain rescue, cave rescue, cliff rescue, military, SWAT, and even by some non-NFPA fire departments. ASTM requirements for light use carabiners are 27 kN MBS on the long axis, 7 kN on the short axis. Requirements for the lesser-used heavy duty rescue carabiners are 40 kN MBS long axis, 10.68 kN short axis.
- Fire rescue: Minimum breaking strength requirements and calculations for rescue carabiners used by NFPA compliant agencies are set out in National Fire Protection Association standard 1983-2012 edition Fire Service Life Safety Rope and Equipment. The standard defines two classes of rescue carabiners. Technical use rescue carabiners are required to have minimum breaking strengths of 27 kN gate closed, 7 kN gate open and 7 kN minor axis. General use rescue carabiners are required to have minimum breaking strengths of 40 kN gate closed, 11 kN gate open and 11 kN minor axis. Testing procedures for rescue carabiners are set out in ASTM International standard F 1956 Standard Specification of Rescue Carabiners.
- Fall protection: Carabiners used for fall protection in US industry are classified as "connectors" and are required to meet Occupational Safety and Health Administration standard 1910.66 App C Personal Fall Arrest System which specifies "drop forged, pressed or formed steel, or made of equivalent materials" and a minimum breaking strength of 5,000 lbf (22 kN).

American National Standards Institute/American Society of Safety Engineers standard ANSI Z359.1-2007 Safety Requirement for Personal Fall Arrest Systems, Subsystems and Components, section 3.2.1.4 (for snap hooks and carabiners) is a voluntary consensus standard. This standard requires that all connectors/ carabiners support a minimum breaking strength (MBS) of 5,000 lbf (22 kN) and feature an auto-locking gate mechanism which supports a minimum breaking strength (MBS) of 3,600 lbf (16 kN).

== History ==
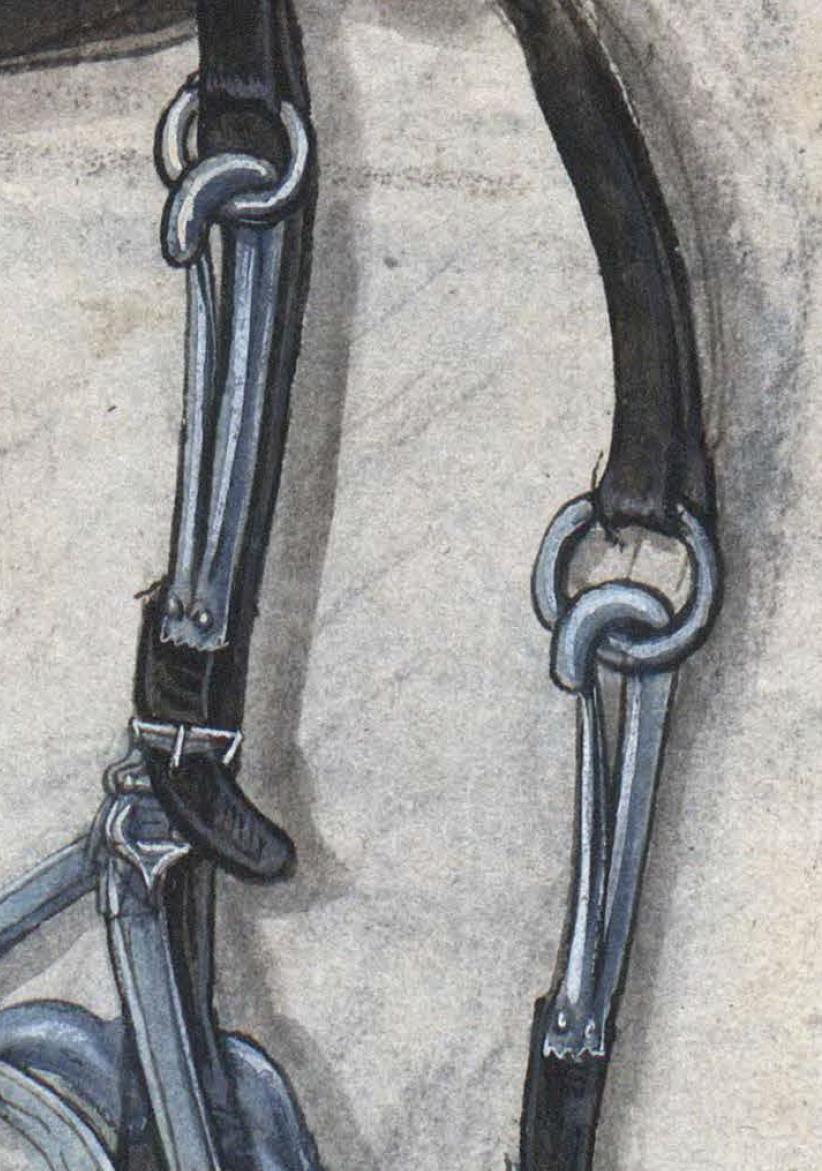
Hooks with a sprung, hinged gate, depicted on a horse's muzzle in the Codex Löffelholz folio 38v, about 1505

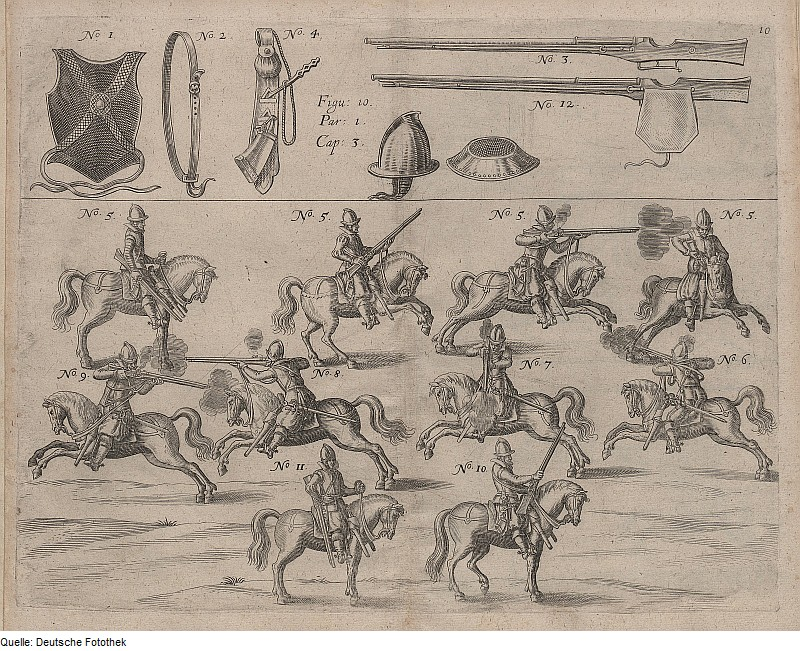
Rather poor depiction of a carabiner attached to a shoulder belt, from Johann Jacob von Wallhausen's Kriegskunst zu Pferdt, 1616

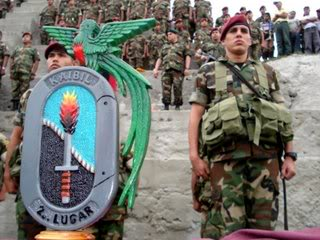
A Caribiner used as the Kaibiles special forces logo

The first known hooks that had a sprung, hinged gate where the spring kept it closed (characteristics expected of a carabiner) were depicted by Nuremberg patrician Martin Löffelholz von Kolberg in about 1505 in the Codex Löffelholz, in the Holy Roman Empire. These then became the clip used to hold a cavalry carbine or arquebus, with the earliest known mention of them being in 1616 by Johann Jacob von Wallhausen in the Holy Roman Empire. They were widely used in many European countries during the 17th century, and typically had a belt attachment and swivel joint, much like a modern luggage strap or handbag strap. The load bearing latch was added in the 1790s, for the British cavalry design. They were used for many other purposes during the 19th century, such as for luggage straps, mining and connecting ropes. Some common designs first appeared during that time, including S-carabiners. Oval links, which had also appeared in 1485, also reappeared as carabiners. Screw gates and internal springs were developed. Prussian fire brigades began to use carabiners for connecting themselves to ladders in 1847, and this became the modern gourd-shaped design by 1868. German and Austrian mountaineers started using them during the late 19th century, with a mention of their use from 1879, and their continued use for climbing by climbers in Saxon Switzerland. The majority used gourd shaped carabiners which were created for mining or other utility purposes.

The common myth suggesting that mountaineering carabiners were invented or made by German climber Otto "Rambo" Herzog in the 1910s has no basis in fact. He used them for some challenging climbs and some new techniques at a time when such "artificial aids" were still controversial in mountain climbing, but he did not invent them or develop any designs, and he was born long after other climbers were already using carabiners.

During the 1920s many designs were used by mountain climbers, such as gourd-shaped, oval or elliptical, mostly sold for general hardware. By the early 1930s, a form of carabiner were being sold for climbing, oval designs being the most popular. During this decade, hardened steel carabiners appeared and the first aluminium carabiner prototypes were made by Pierre Allain, although they were never sold.

The modern carabiner that endures today was first designed and widely distributed during WWII for the US Army. Raffi Bedayn, an engineer from the San Francisco Bay Area was assigned the project to meet a need for swift, strong and secure rope attachments for use by the infantry. Bedayn was one of the early "golden age" Yosemite mountain climbers with years of involvement with the American Alpine Club and drew on his experience to inform his design. Bedayn crafted a smooth steel oval with a spring-operated lever opening (or "gate") and a rod-and-hook gate closure that imbeds in the carabiner body to prevent twisting, a design still in use today. Bedayn innovated the use of lighter aluminum when steel became scarce during the war. Early carabiners from Bedayn's commercial production efforts during the late 1940s - 1960s have "Bedayn California" or "Bedayn Calif." engraved on the gate or on one end of the oval. These were the first commercially produced carabiners designed specifically for climbing.

Later innovations included offset D-shaped carabiners and locking mechanisms. Rock climbers such as Yvon Chouinard were credited for ongoing evolutionary adaptions of the basic design - such as the "D shape" carabiner and locking features, which facilitated better safety and stability during climbs. Aluminium carabiners were first sold to the military in 1941, which were the first commercial carabiners designed specifically for climbing. Slightly offset D-shaped carabiners were sold in the late 1940s, which became the standard offset D-shape (which is now the most common) in the 1950s.

Chouinard Equipment introduced the 22 kN aluminium carabiner in 1968, though this strength had already been far surpassed by steel carabiners. Wiregate carabiners were first patented in 1969, and were sold for maritime use. They were first sold for climbing in 1996. The popular keylock, which avoids snagging, was developed around 1984–1987.

== See also ==
- Maillon
- Lobster clasp
- Rock-climbing equipment
- Glossary of climbing terms
- Carabiner code
