= Top rope climbing =

Type of rock climbing

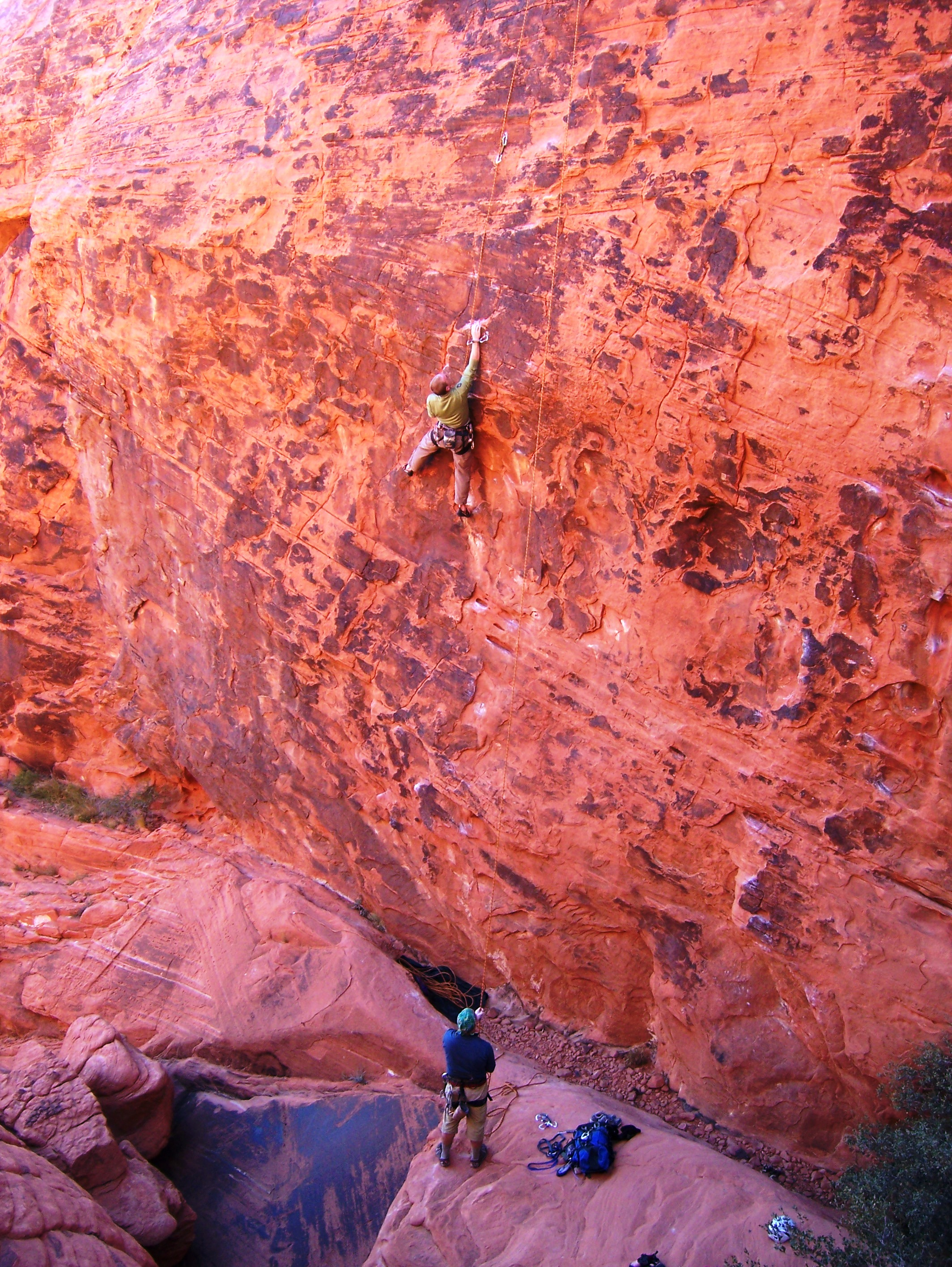
Climbers practicising the sport climb, Purple Haze (5.10d), on a top rope, in Red Rocks, Nevada

Top rope climbing (or top roping) is a form of rock climbing where the climber is securely attached to a climbing rope that runs through a fixed anchor at the top of the route, and back down to the belayer (or "second") at the base of the climb. A climber who falls will be held by the rope at the point of the fall, and can then either resume their climb or have the belayer lower them down in a controlled manner to the base of the climb. Climbers on indoor climbing walls can use mechanical auto belay devices to top rope alone.

A typical top roping set-up, with the belayer standing on the ground, is performed on routes that are less than half the length of a typical climbing rope, which means single-pitch routes that are below 25–35 metres (82–115 ft) in height. Where the belayer is above the climber, such as on a multi-pitch climbing route, the half-length restriction would not apply. Top roping is not restricted to rock climbing, and the technique is used in ice climbing, and the related sports of mixed climbing and dry-tooling, and it is also used in combination with auto belay devices in both competition speed climbing and competition ice climbing.

Top roping is one of the safest forms of rock climbing and is used by most beginners and novices of the sport. Before the era of sport climbing, top roping a route for practice (known as headpointing or hangdogging) was considered poor practice; however, it is now a legitimate technique in preparing for a redpoint ascent. Top roping a new route is not considered a first free ascent of a climb, and because of the ability of the belayer to give aid to the climber, it is not strictly free climbing (although some advocate that with slack, it is similar to free climbing), and is thus differentiated from "normal" lead climbing.

== Description ==
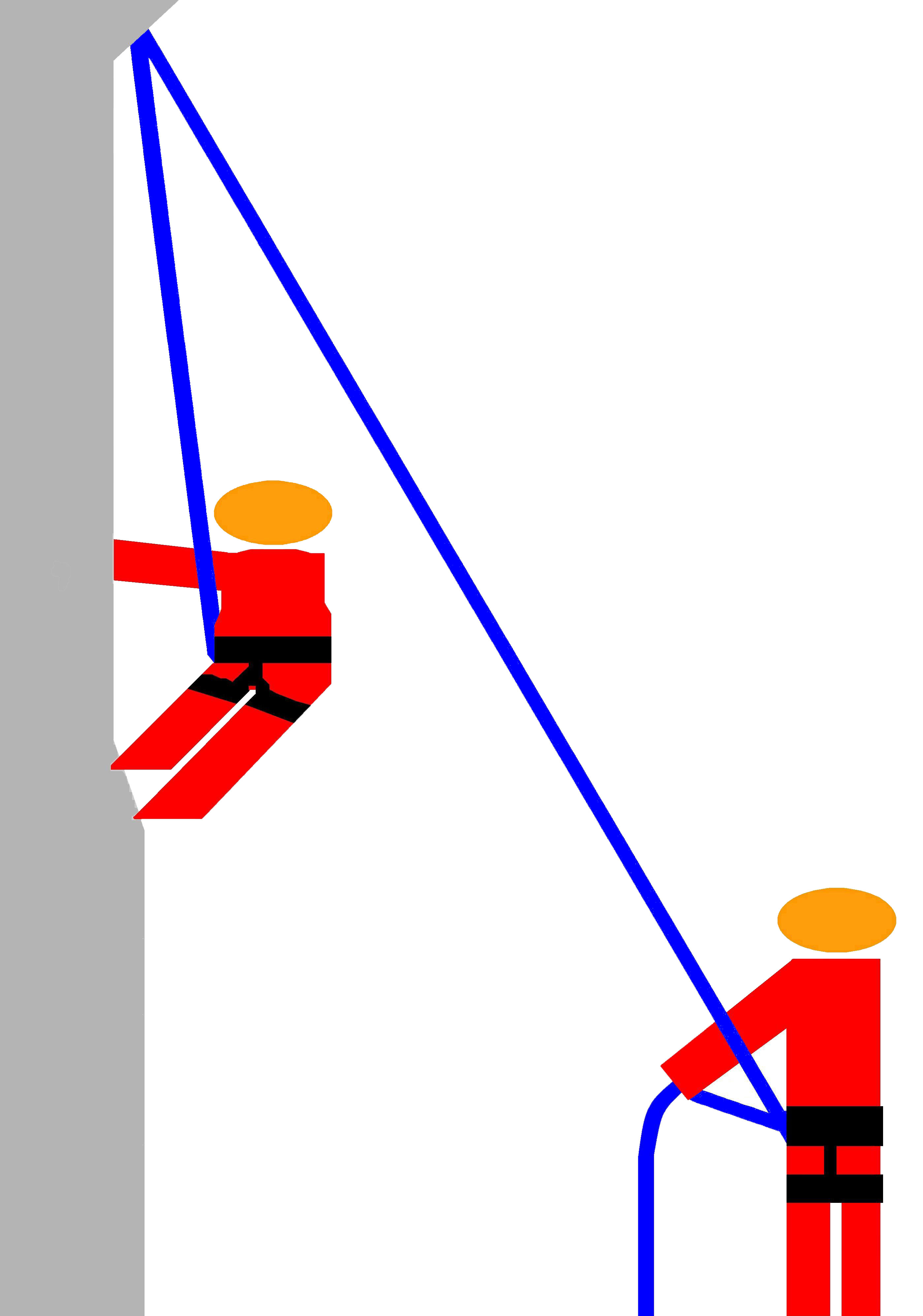
The most typical top-roping set-up with the belayer on the ground

In the most typical top-roping set-up (see first diagram), the climber and their belayer (or "second"), arrange a fixed anchor at the top of the climb and then hang the rope down from this anchor at the rope's approximate mid-point, so that two parts of the rope are now hanging down the route. By definition, this kind of top-roping set-up is only possible where the climbers can get to the top of the route by other means so that they can set up the anchor and pass the rope through it.

Once the top-rope is set up, the climber is then tied to one end of the rope (using a figure-eight loop follow-through knot), and the belayer clips their belay device into the other side of the hanging rope. As the climber ascends the route, the belayer "takes in" the "slack" in the rope, so that a climber who falls can simply hang from the rope, which is in contrast to lead climbing where the climber will fall at least twice the distance to their last point of climbing protection.

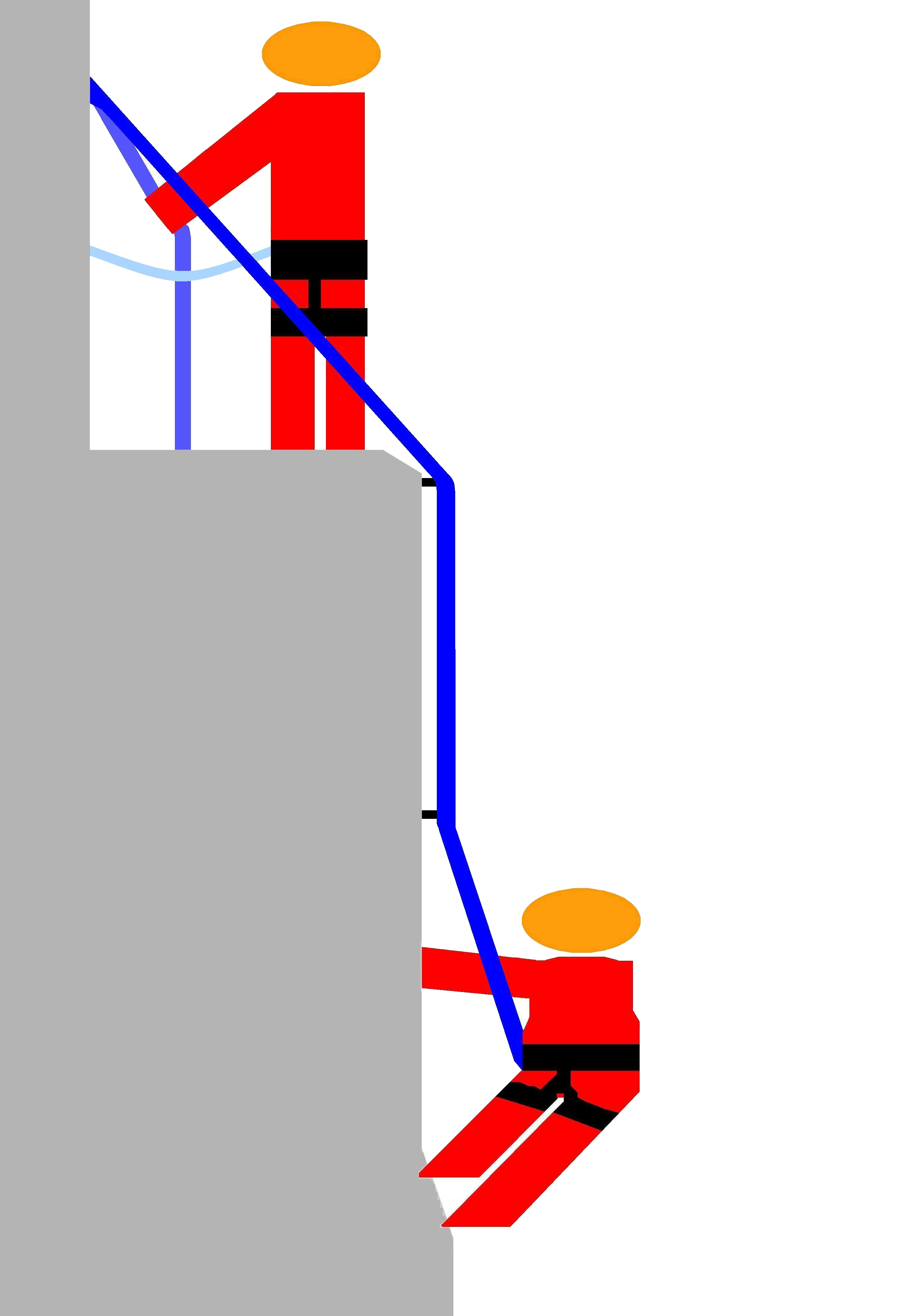
A belayer above the climber is also considered top roping

In the typical top-roping set-up, the climbing rope needs to be at least twice the length of the climbing route (because the rope goes to the top of the climbing route and back to the climber who is starting at the ground level). As climbing ropes are 50–70 metres (160–230 ft) in length, it means that top-roping is only done on routes that are 25–35 metres (82–115 ft) in height (if not shorter, for safety), which are single-pitch routes. However, where the belayer is above the climber, which happens on multi-pitch climbing routes (see second diagram), no such restruction applies, and the top-rope can be a full rope length in distance.

=== Comparison with free-climbing ===
A belayer who takes in all the slack and maintains a high level of tautness in the rope is giving the climber a source of artificial aid as they ascend the route. A physically strong belayer, or a belayer with a light climber, can physically haul the climber up the route by pulling hard on the taught rope. Because of this, top roping is not considered free climbing (and nor is it considered lead climbing), and a top-rope ascent cannot be used to claim a first free ascent (FFA) of a new climbing route.

== Use by leading climbers ==
Before the arrival of sport climbing in the mid-1980s, practicing a traditional climbing route using a top rope before attempting to free climb the route was considered poor practice. A first free ascent where the climber had practiced the route on a top rope (called headpointing or hangdogging), was noted in guidebooks to record its lesser status. When the sport climbing definition of an FFA — the redpoint — became the standard definition in sport climbing and traditional climbing, such distinctions were dropped, and leading climbers now make extensive legitimate use of hangdogging and headpointing top-roping techniques when preparing (or projecting) for redpoint FFAs.

In the 1998 climbing film Hard Grit, British traditional climber Johnny Dawes advocated for the use of a top rope — with enough slack in the rope to avoid any implication of aid (so that in a fall, the climber would fall a few metres before the rope became taut)— to qualify as a free ascent on extreme traditional climbing routes, however, his view was not adopted by the wider climbing community.

== Equipment ==
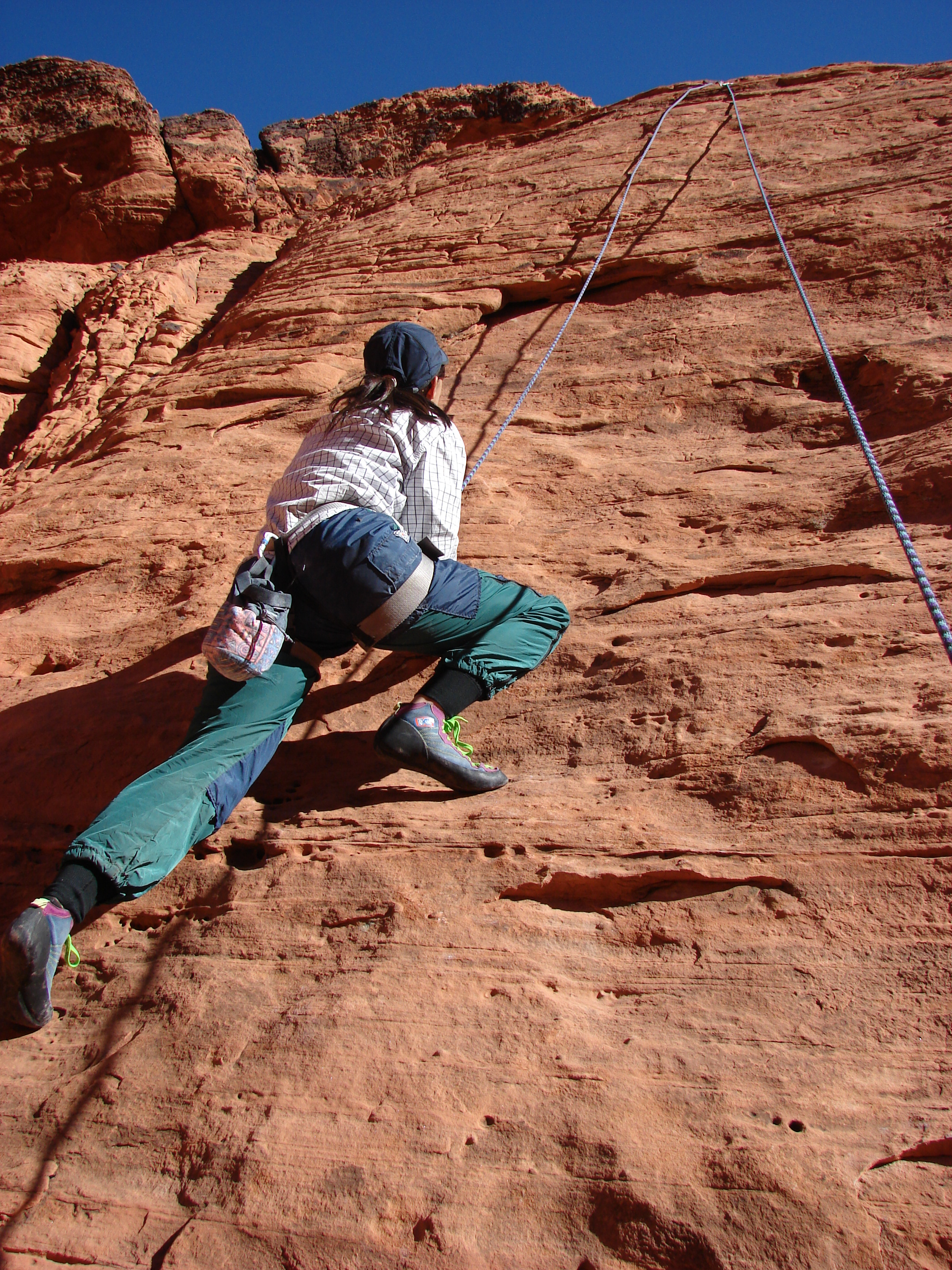
Climber top roping at Cow Lick Crag, Calico Basin, Nevada

In common with lead climbing, top roping requires the standard equipment of a harness attached to one end of a dynamic kernmantle rope (usually via a figure-eight knot). The second person, who is belaying, will use a standard mechanical belay device that is clipped into the rope, and which pays out the rope as needed but can grip it tightly to catch the climber in the event of a fall.

=== Anchors ===
Top roping requires a fixed anchor at the top of the climb, from which two sides of the rope can be hung back down to the belayer at the base of the climb. Because top roping is either done by novice climbers, or by experienced climbers practicing to attempt a route at the limit of their capabilities, there is a high probability that the anchor will experience a load, and the anchor, therefore, needs to be strong and secure. Some climbing areas place fixed in-situ artificial anchors (such as iron rings or cement blocks) at the top of popular routes to assist novice climbers in creating a strong fixed anchor for their top-rope.

=== Auto belays ===
Some indoor climbing walls offer auto belay devices that enable a solo-climber to top-rope without needing a belay partner below. The auto belay is fixed to the top of the route and the climber clips into a wire that pays out from the device, and as they ascend the auto-belay pulls in the wire. The device thus belays the climber from above, as if they were on a top rope. Top roping with auto belay devices is the format used in competition speed climbing and in the speed elements of competition ice climbing.

== Top-rope solo-climbing ==
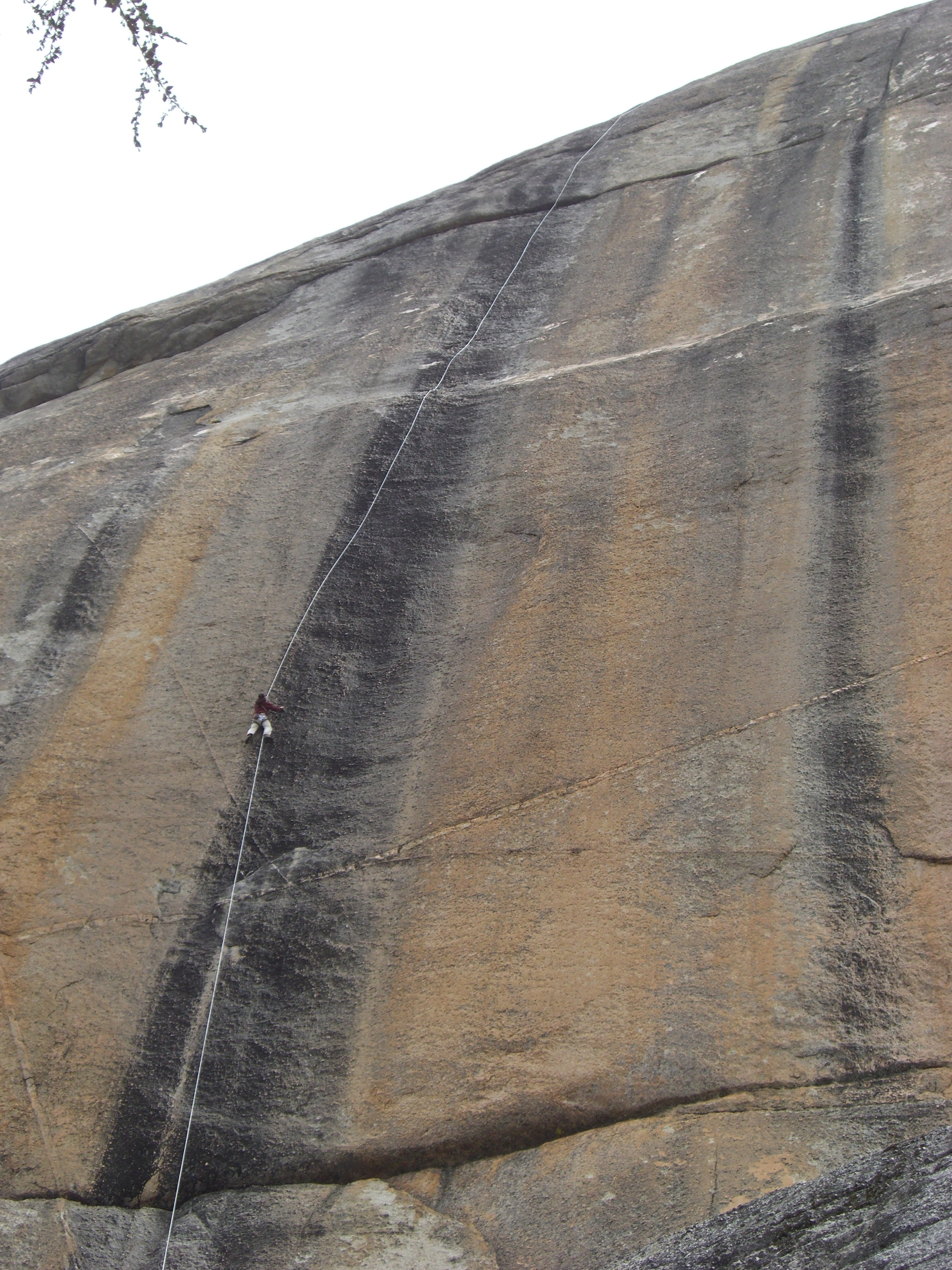
Ron Kauk top-rope solo-climbing on Bachar-Yerian route 5.11c (6c+), Yosemite

It is also possible to top-rope without the help of another person to act as belayer. Top-rope solo climbing is where a single-length static fixed-rope, which is anchored at the top of the climbing route, is laid along the entire length of the climb to the ground (e.g., unlike in typical top roping, the two sides of the rope are not needed). The climber then clips-into this fixed-rope using at least one progress capture device (PCD), such as a Petzl Micro Traxion or a Camp Lift, which will allow the rope to pay-through as the climber ascends but should grip the rope immediately in the event of a fall. As with typical top roping, the falling top-rope solo-climber will never drop any distance, and will just hang from the rope at the point they lost control.

The techniques of top-rope solo-climbing are sometimes used in big wall climbing. When the lead climber reaches the top of a given pitch on the route, they can anchor a static rope and pass it down the their second(s) waiting below at the base ofthe pitch. The second(s) can ascend this static tope like a top-rope solo-climber without any assistance from the leader. Using this technique allows the leader to focus on other things, such as setting up a secure bivouac site for the team with portaledges, or it can also allow the leader to take a complete rest from any action if needed.

== Use in ice climbing ==
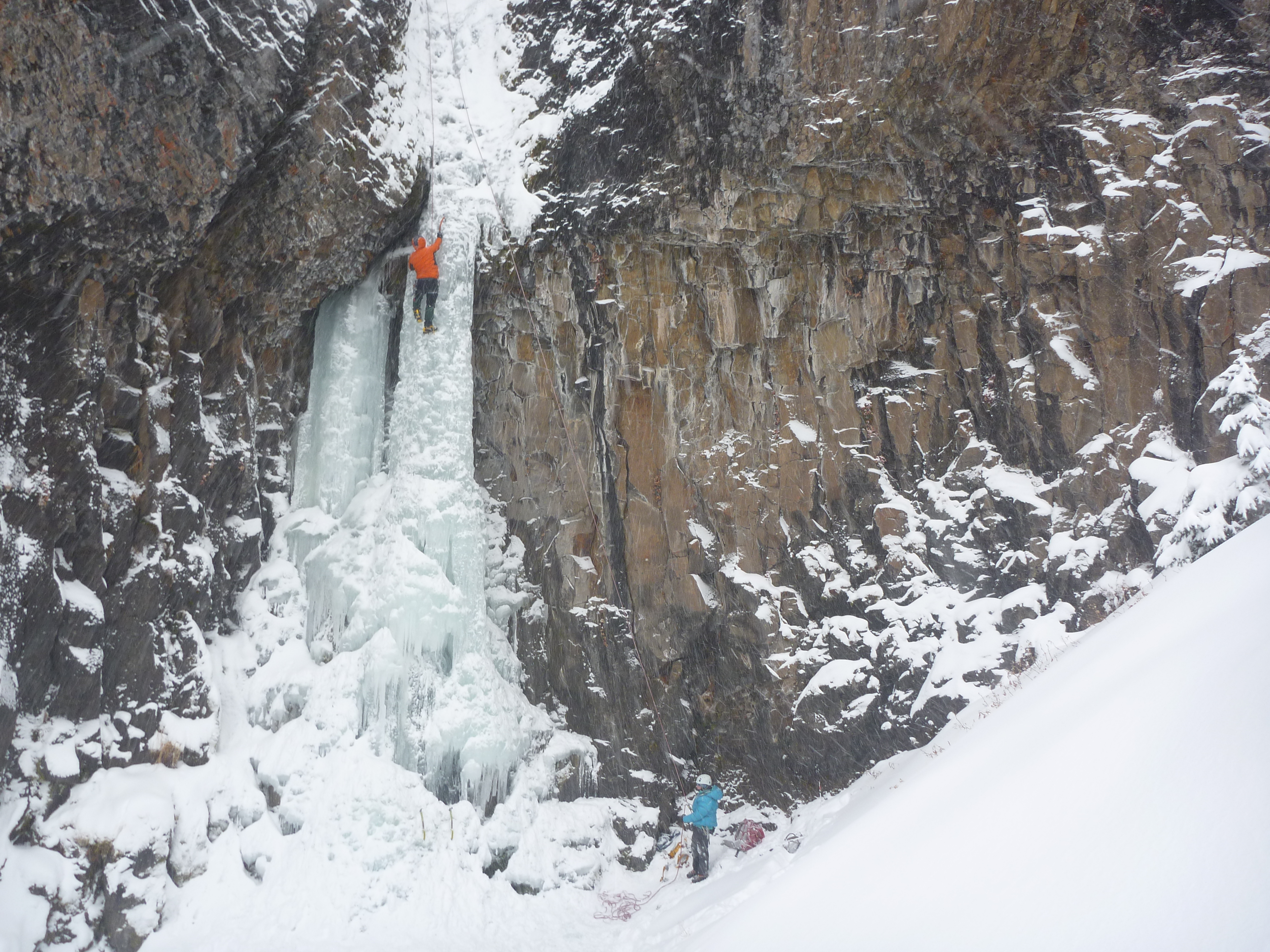
Ice climber top-roping Elevator Shaft (Grade WI3-4), Montana

Ice climbing, mixed climbing and dry tooling, also use top-roping techniques to provide greater safety to climbers as an alternative to lead climbing the routes. Lead climbing on ice is considered even more challenging than on rock, as the placement of secure ice screws is a complex task that requires judgment on ice quality and stability. The technique of top roping in ice climbing is identical to that of rock climbing, but sometimes the creation of a secure anchor point at the top of the route can be more complex if it involves securing into the ice (e.g. it may require the creation of an Abalakov thread as an anchor point).

== See also ==
- Aid climbing
- Rope solo climbing
- Competition climbing
