= Lead climbing =

Technique of rock climbing

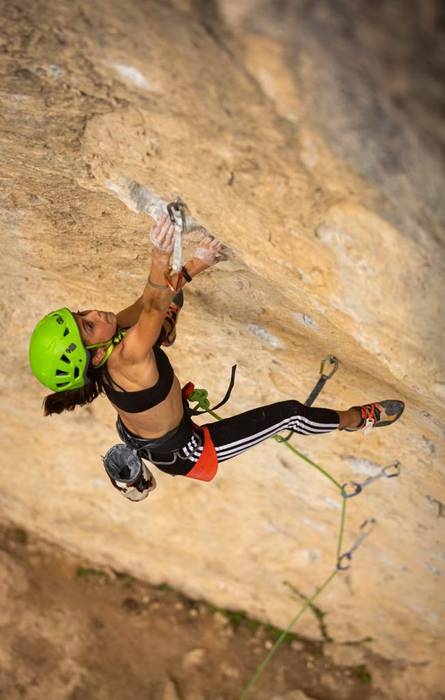
A lead climber on the bolted sport climbing route Gezurren Erresuma 8c (5.14b), in Spain. Her rope has been clipped into several protection points.

Lead climbing (or leading) is a technique in rock climbing where two climbers work together to ascend a climbing route. The lead climber clips their rope into pieces of protection as they ascend the route. The 'second' stands at the base of the route controlling the other end of the rope, which is called belaying (e.g. if the lead climber falls, the second locks the rope). The term distinguishes between the two roles and the greater effort and increased risk of the role of the lead climber.

Leading a route contrasts with the alternative climbing technique of top roping, where even though there is still a second belaying the rope, the lead climber faces no risk in the event of a fall and does not need to clip into any protection as the rope is already anchored to the top of the route (e.g. if they fall they will just hang from the static rope). Leading a climbing route is a core activity in rock climbing, and first ascents (FA) and first free ascents (FFA) of new routes, in the absence of a free solo, are done via lead climbing.

Lead climbing can be performed as free climbing, in either a traditional or a sport climbing format—leading a traditional climb is a much riskier and physically demanding exercise. Competition lead climbing is performed in a sport-climbing format and will be a standalone medal event at the 2028 Summer Olympics. Lead climbing can also be performed as aid climbing. The term is not applied to free solo climbing, as the free solo climber is alone and thus there is no need to distinguish the role of leader from the second. Leading is not exclusive to rock climbing, and can also be performed in ice climbing or in mixed climbing.

== Description ==
The two phases of leading a climb

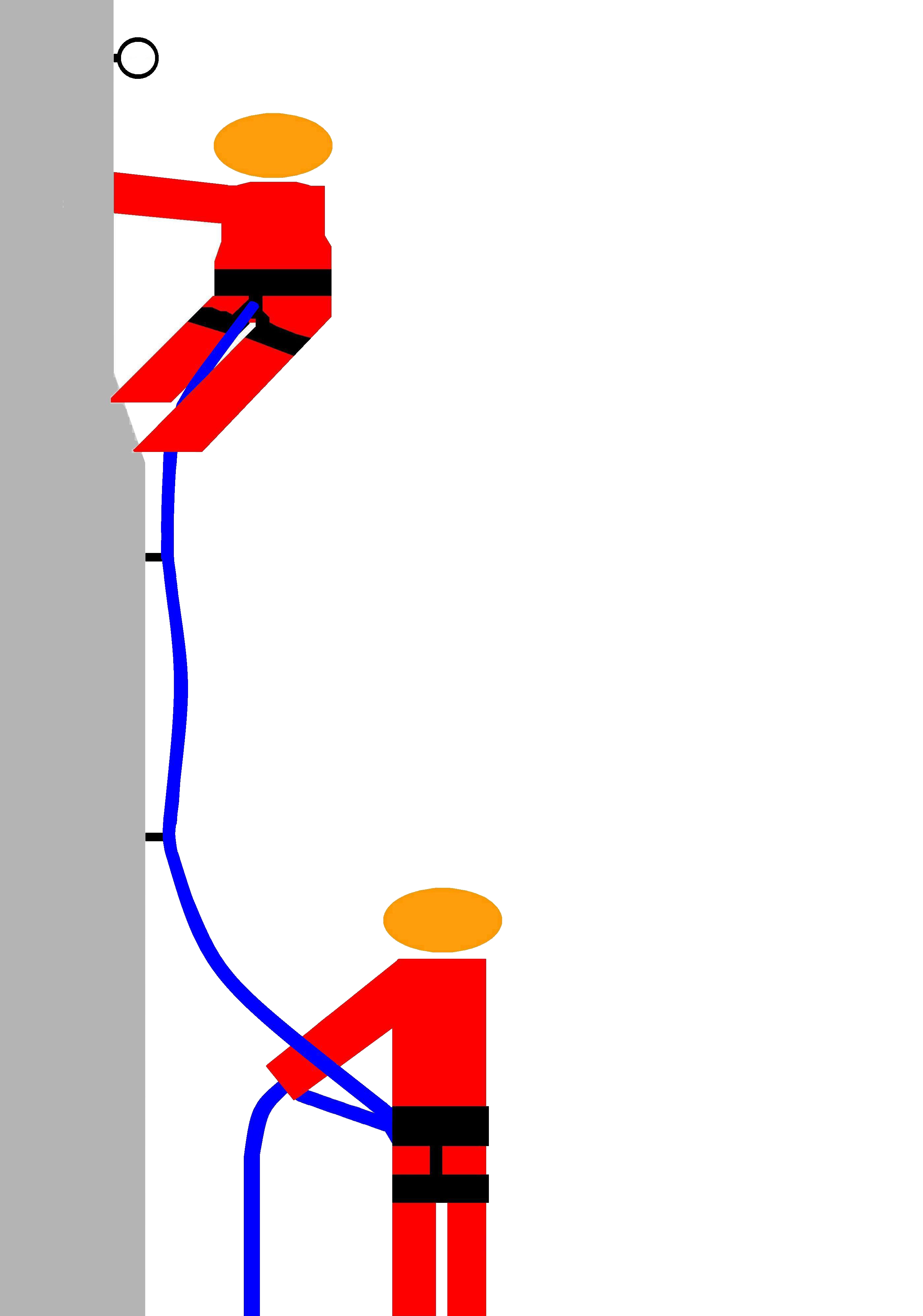
1. Leader (top, climbing) being belayed by their second (below, static)

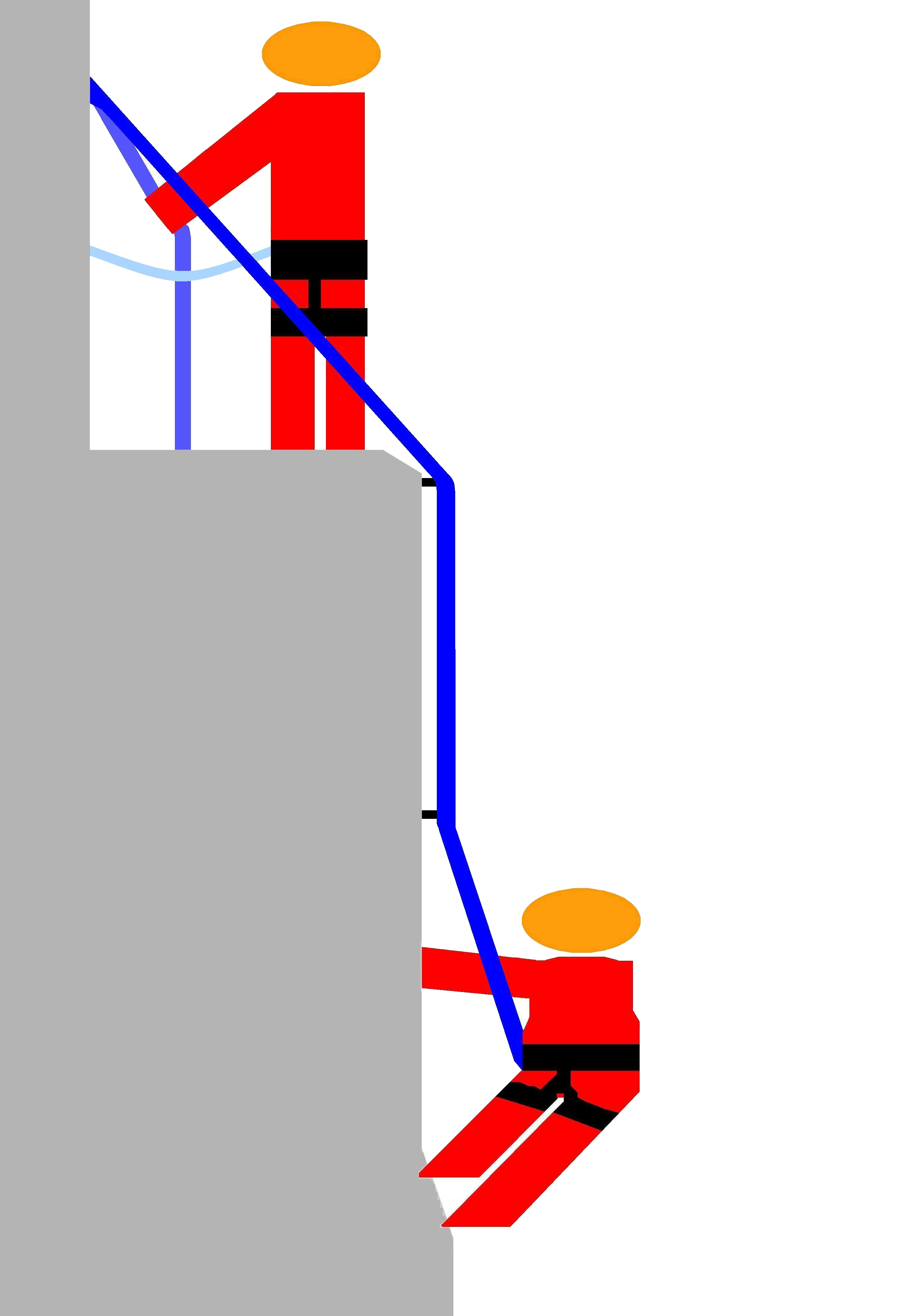
2. Leader (top, static) now belaying their second (below, climbing)

Leading a climb involves a 'lead climbing pair'. The lead climber—the person initially doing the climbing—will have a rope attached to their harness and they will clip it into points of protection as they ascend the route. The second (or belayer) remains static standing at the base of the route, and controlling the other end of the rope, which is called belaying. The second will use a belay device to attach the rope to their harness from which they can 'pay-out' the rope as the lead climber ascends, but with which they can lock the rope if the lead climber falls. Once the lead climber has reached the top, they create a fixed anchor so they can act as the 'belayer' (from above), controlling the rope while the second ascends. The second will unclip the rope from the protection as they ascend.

If the pair are leading a traditional climbing route, the lead climber must also arrange and insert 'removable protection' into the rock face as they climb the route (the second will take it out as they ascend). However, if they are leading a sport climbing route, the protection will already be installed via pre-drilled bolts into the rock face. Leading a traditional route is therefore a riskier and more physically demanding undertaking than leading a sport-climbing route of the same grade.

If the lead climber falls they will drop at least twice the distance to their last point of protection. For example, if the lead climber is 3 metres (10 ft) above their protection when they fall—and the 'belayer' immediately locks the rope—they will drop 6 metres (20 ft) until the locked rope holds them. This aspect makes lead climbing a more physically demanding activity than top roping, where the lead climber is immediately held by the top-rope if they fall. In contrast, when the second is climbing and is belayed by the lead climber from above, they are effectively top-roping and the rope will immediately hold them if they fall. This puts less onus on the skills of the second climber, and they can also be partially pulled up the route by the lead climber if needed.

Leading a climb requires good communication between the lead climber and the second who is doing the belaying. The lead climber will want to avoid the second holding the rope too tightly, which can create rope drag that acts as a downward force on the lead climber. However, where the lead climber feels that a fall is imminent (e.g. on a very hard section), they will want the second to take in any slack in the rope to minimize the length of their drop in the event that they fall.

Types of climbing protection used in lead climbing

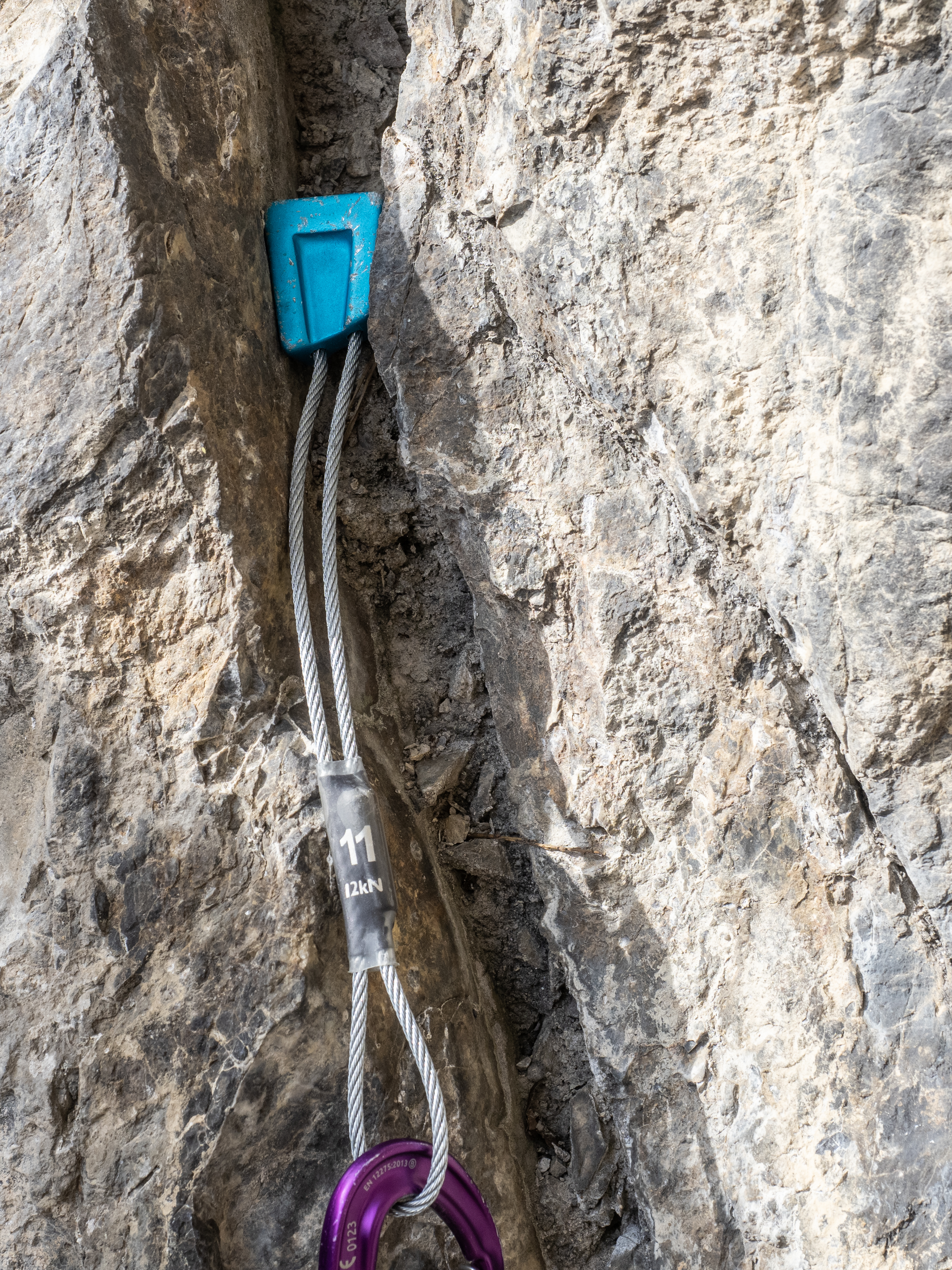
Removable nut on a traditional climbing route

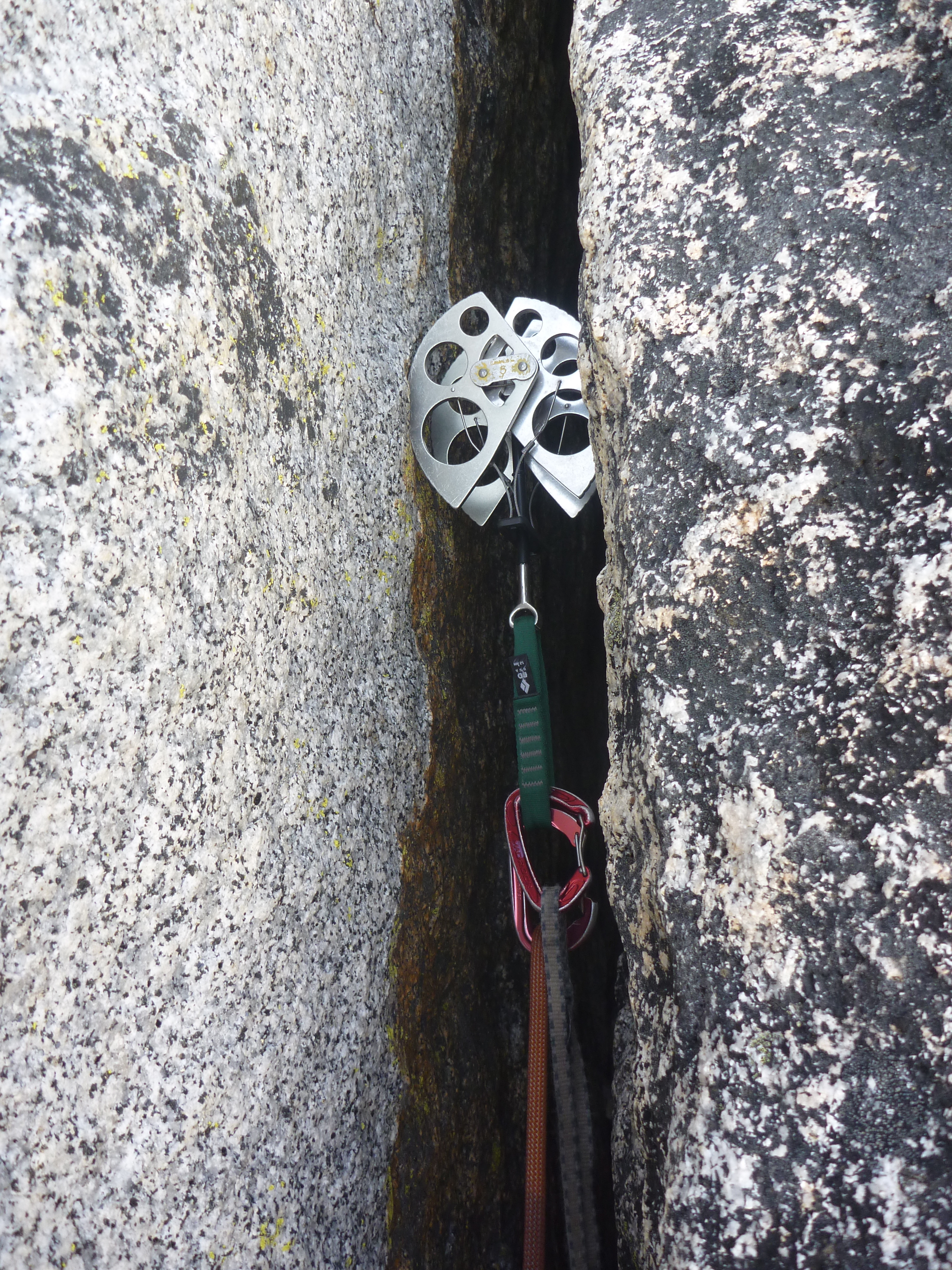
Removable SLCD on a traditional climbing route

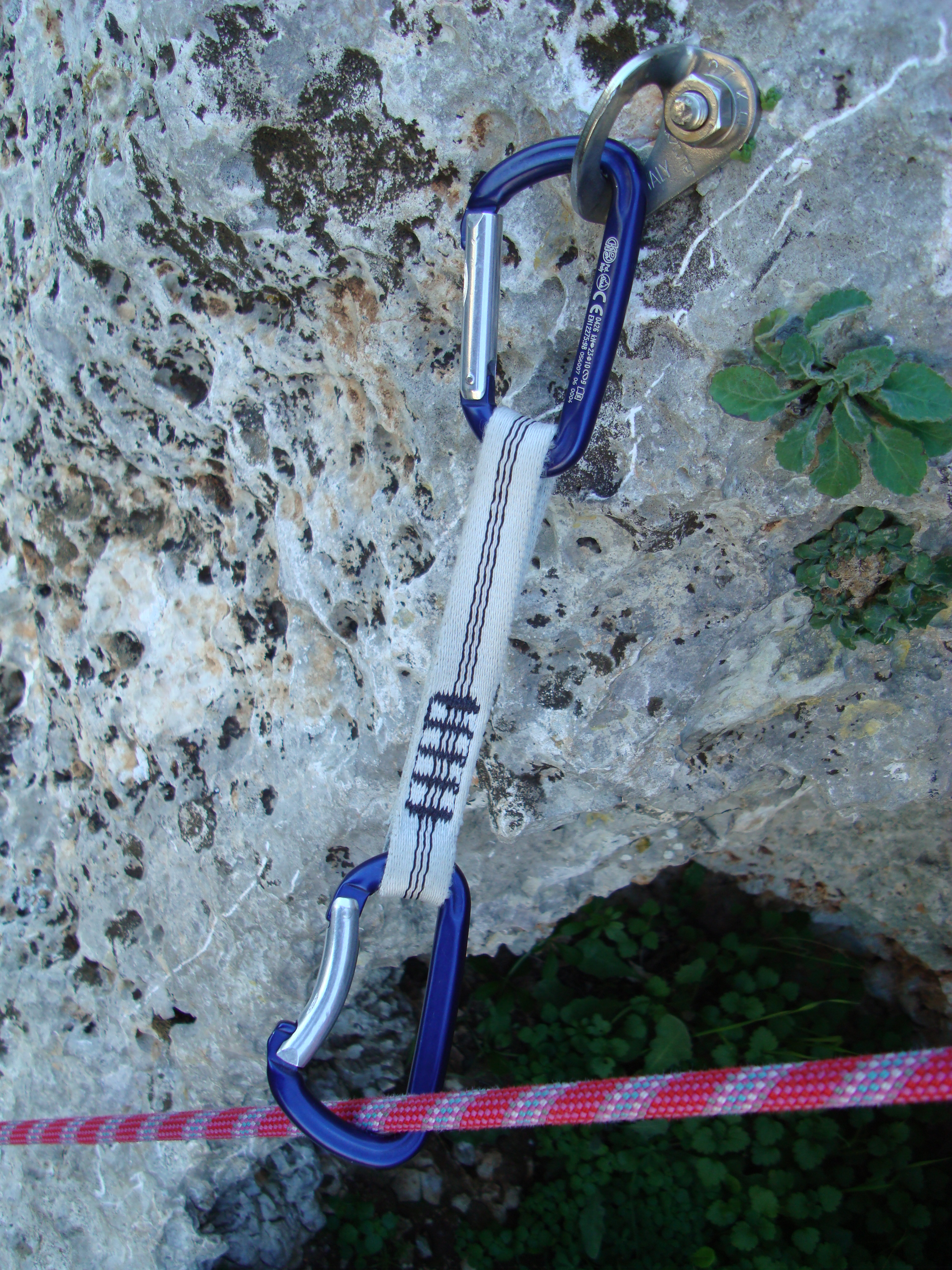
Fixed bolt and quickdraw on a sport climb

=== First ascent and redpoint ===
In the absence of a free solo of a climb, leading a route is required to satisfy the definition of what is a first ascent (FA), or a first free ascent (FFA), in climbing. The technical grades assigned to climbing routes are based on the climber lead-climbing the route, and not top-roping it. If a climber wants to test themselves at a specific technical grade, or set a new technical grade milestone in the sport, then they must lead-climb the route.

Before the arrival of sport-climbing in the early 1980s, traditional climbers frowned upon FFAs where the lead climber had practiced the route beforehand on a top-rope (called headpointing). The arrival of sport-climbing led to the development of the redpoint as the accepted definition of a lead climbing FFA, which includes the practices of headpointing. Where a lead climber can redpoint a climbing route on their first attempt and without any prior knowledge, it is called an onsight, which is considered a distinctive redpoint, and is recorded in grade milestones and climbing guidebooks.

== Competition lead climbing ==
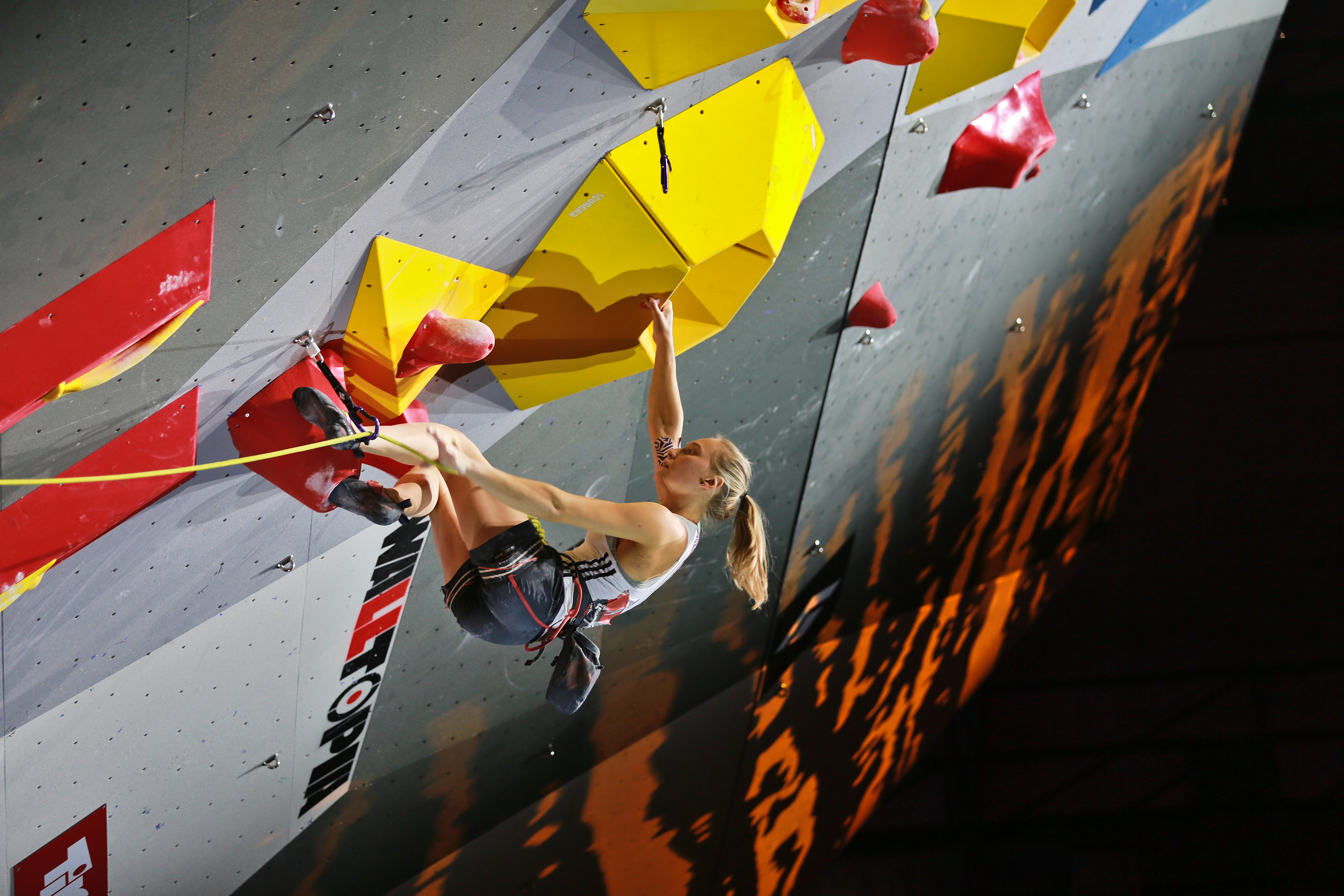
Janja Garnbret in the 2018 World Climbing Championships about to clip her rope into a hanging quickdraw

The arrival of the safer format of sport climbing in the early 1980s led to a rapid development in the related sport of competition lead climbing. The first major international lead climbing competition was held in Italy at Sportroccia in 1985. By the late 1990s, competitive lead climbing was joined by competition bouldering, and competition speed climbing in what was to become the annual World Climbing Series and the biennial World Climbing Championships, where it is a standalone medal event.

Competition lead climbing first appeared as an event in the 2020 Summer Olympics for men's and women's events; it was structured in a format consisting of a single "combined" event of lead, bouldering and speed climbing. At the 2024 Summer Olympics, lead climbing was combined with bouldering in a bouldering-lead climbing medal event (with speed climbing separated), and for the 2028 Summer Olympics, lead climbing will feature as a standalone medal event, as per World Climbing events.

== Risk ==
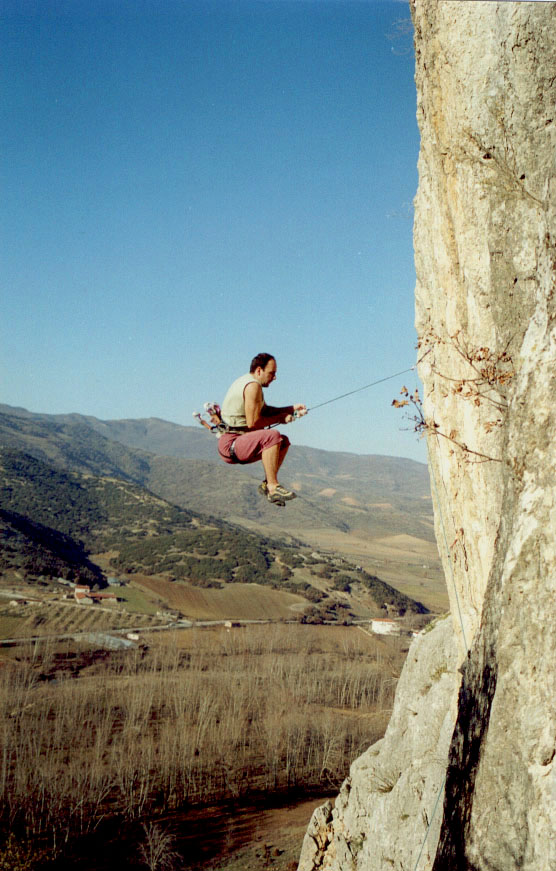
A lead climber in the process of falling, where the belayer (who is not visible) has locked the rope, and the lead climber is in the process of falling over twice the distance to their last piece of protection.

Aside from the specific risks involved in placing the temporary protection equipment when leading traditional climbing routes—and making sure that it will not rip out in the event of a fall—the lead climber also needs to manage other general risks when they are leading a route.

Runout is the distance from the lead climber to the last point of protection. In any fall, the lead climber falls at least twice the distance of the runout (and sometimes more if the climbing rope flexes, or if the belayer does not immediately lock the rope and lets more rope 'pay-out'). The greater the runout, the greater the total distance in any fall, and the greater the risk to the lead climber. Some leads involve runouts where any fall will result in a "ground-fall" (also called "hitting the deck").

Extreme climbing routes tend to be very overhanging (e.g. Realization or Silence), and thus where a lead climber falls, they naturally avoid hitting any obstacles on the way down until the rope holds. In contrast, on easier climbing routes, there is a greater chance of the lead climber hitting against obstacles on the rock face as they fall, thus risking injury.

Back-clipping is where the rope is clipped into a quickdraw in such a way that the lead climber's end runs underneath the quickdraw carabiner as opposed to over the top of it; if the leader falls, the rope may fold directly over the carabiner gate causing it to open with dangerous consequences.

Z-clipping is where the lead climber grabs the rope below an already clipped quickdraw and clips it into the next quickdraw, resulting in a "zig-zag" shape of the rope on the wall, which can create immense rope drag making further progress impossible until it is fixed.

Turtling is where one of the lead climber's limbs is behind the rope when they fall, which can result in the climber being "flipped" upside down (i.e. like a turtle on its back), which can then eject the climber from their harness, which is a serious event.

== Equipment ==
Equipment needed for different lead climbing formats

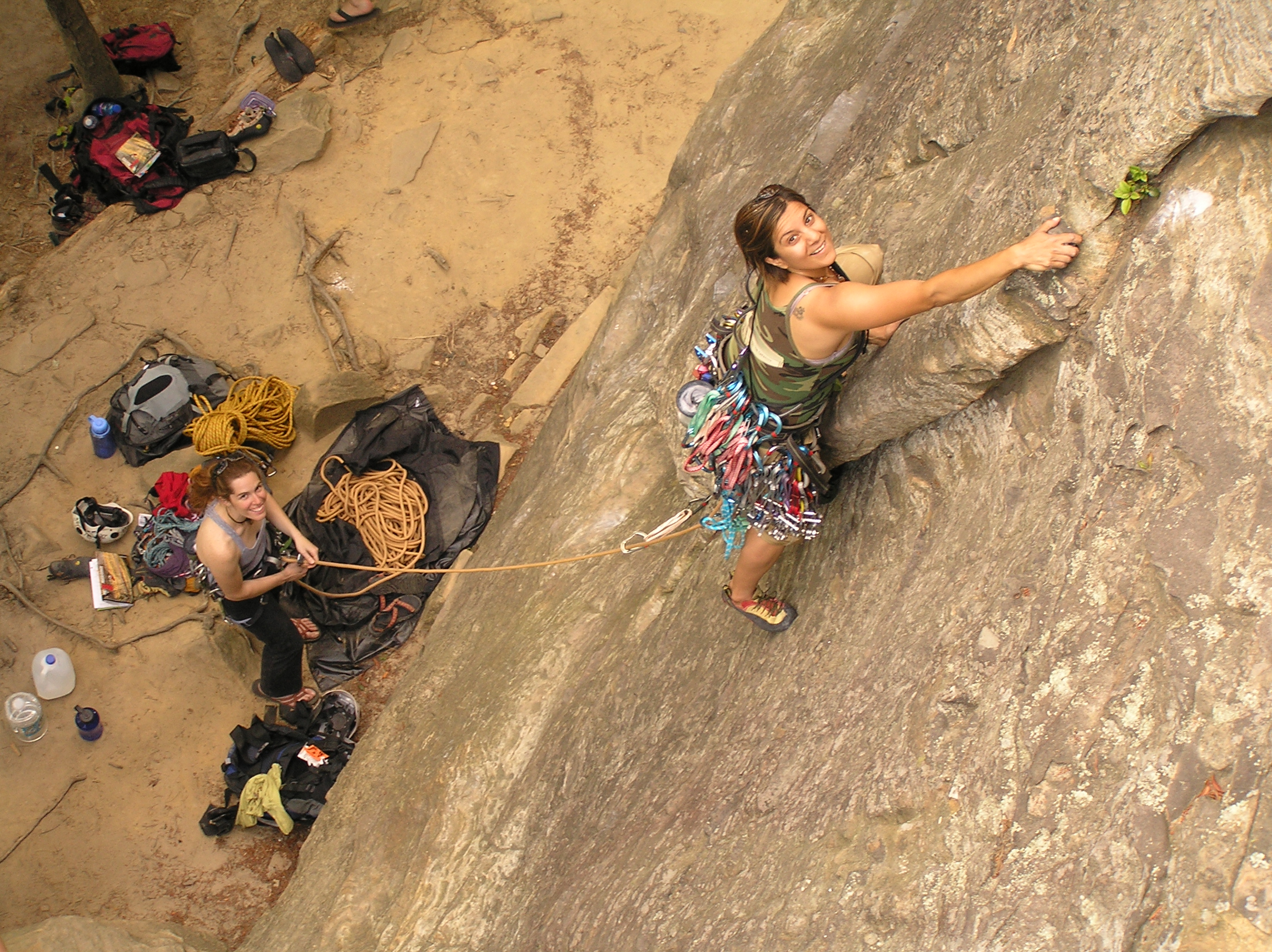
Lead climber on a traditional route carrying their protection on their harness whilst being belayed by their second who is standing below.

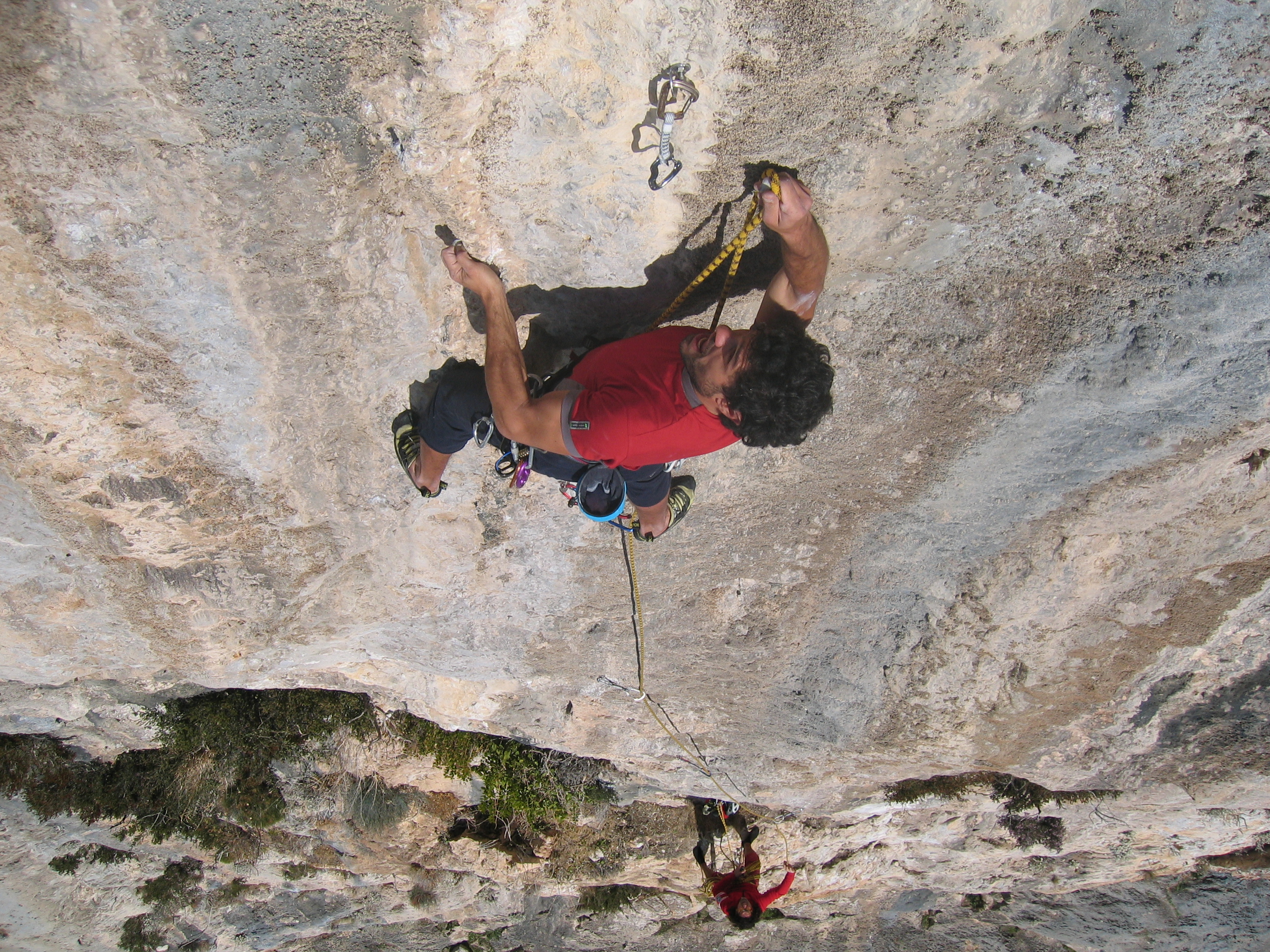
Lead climber on a sport route about to clip the rope into a quickdraw hanging from pre-installed bolts, with their belayer standing below.

Regardless of the particular type of format that the lead climber is undertaking (i.e. traditional, sport, or aid), they will require a harness attached to one end of a dynamic kernmantle rope (usually via a figure-eight knot). Their second—who will be belaying—will use a mechanical belay device that is clipped into the climbing rope and which 'pays-out' the rope as needed as the lead climber ascends the route, but which can immediately grip the rope tightly in the event that the lead climber falls.

Where the lead climber is following a traditional-climbing format, they will need to carry an extensive range of protective equipment (which is often referred to as a 'climbing rack' and is usually worn around the waist being attached to the climbing harness) such as nuts, hexcentrics and tricams (known as "passive" protection), and spring-loaded camming devices (or "friends", and known as "active protection").

Where the lead climber is following a sport-climbing format, they only need to carry quickdraws (which they will also attach to their climbing harness) that they will clip into the pre-drilled bolts along the sport route.

Some indoor climbing walls have in-situ mechanical lead auto belay devices enabling the climber to lead a route but belayed by the device. Typical versions belay the lead climber from above so the climber is essentially top roping, and thus does not need to carry any climbing protection.

== Multi-pitch leading ==
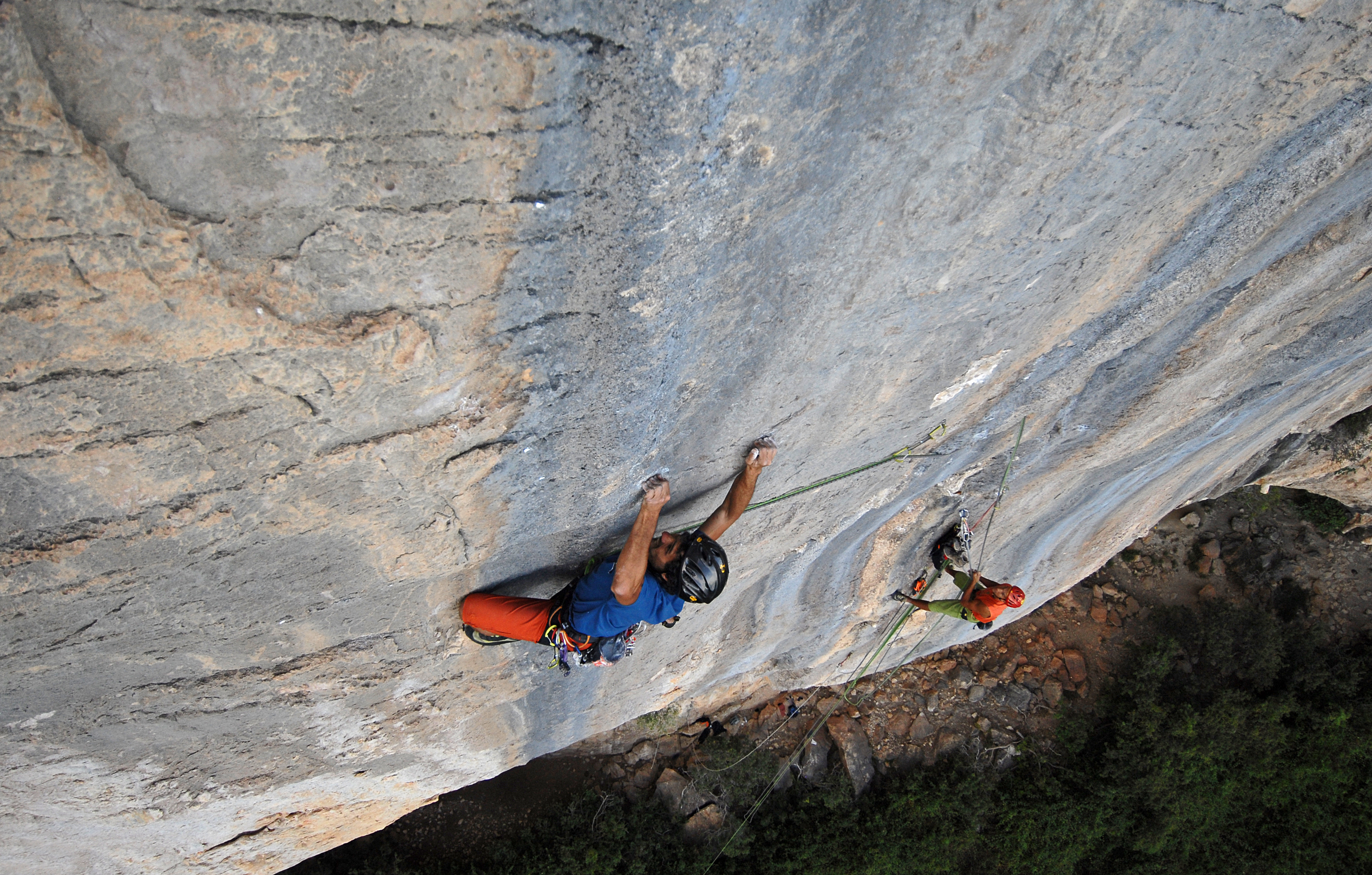
Lead climbing pair on a multi-pitch sport-climbing route with the belayer in a hanging belay below the leader

Longer climbing routes (such as in big wall climbing) are usually led in series of multiple pitches of circa 35–50 metres (115–164 ft) in length. In multi-pitch leading, the two climbers can swap the roles of lead climber and second on successive pitches. The second must also be comfortable working from a hanging belay (see image opposite), and both need to be familiar with the process for swapping between roles at the end of each pitch, safely and efficiently and without becoming accidentally unattached from the protection. Given that average pitch length will be longer, and that the weather potentially poorer, both climbers need to communicate clearly, and know the climbing commands.

On long but easier routes, the lead climbing pair may use simul climbing, whereby both climbers simultaneously ascend the route. The lead climber acts like on a normal lead climb whereas the second does not remain belaying in a static position, but instead also climbs, removing and unclipping the protection equipment of the lead climber. Both climbers are tied to the rope at all times, and both make sure that there are several points of protection in-situ between them. Simul climbing is performed on terrain both climbers are very comfortable on as any fall can still be very serious. In simul climbing, the stronger climber will often go second, which is in contrast to normal lead climbing.

== In other climbing disciplines ==
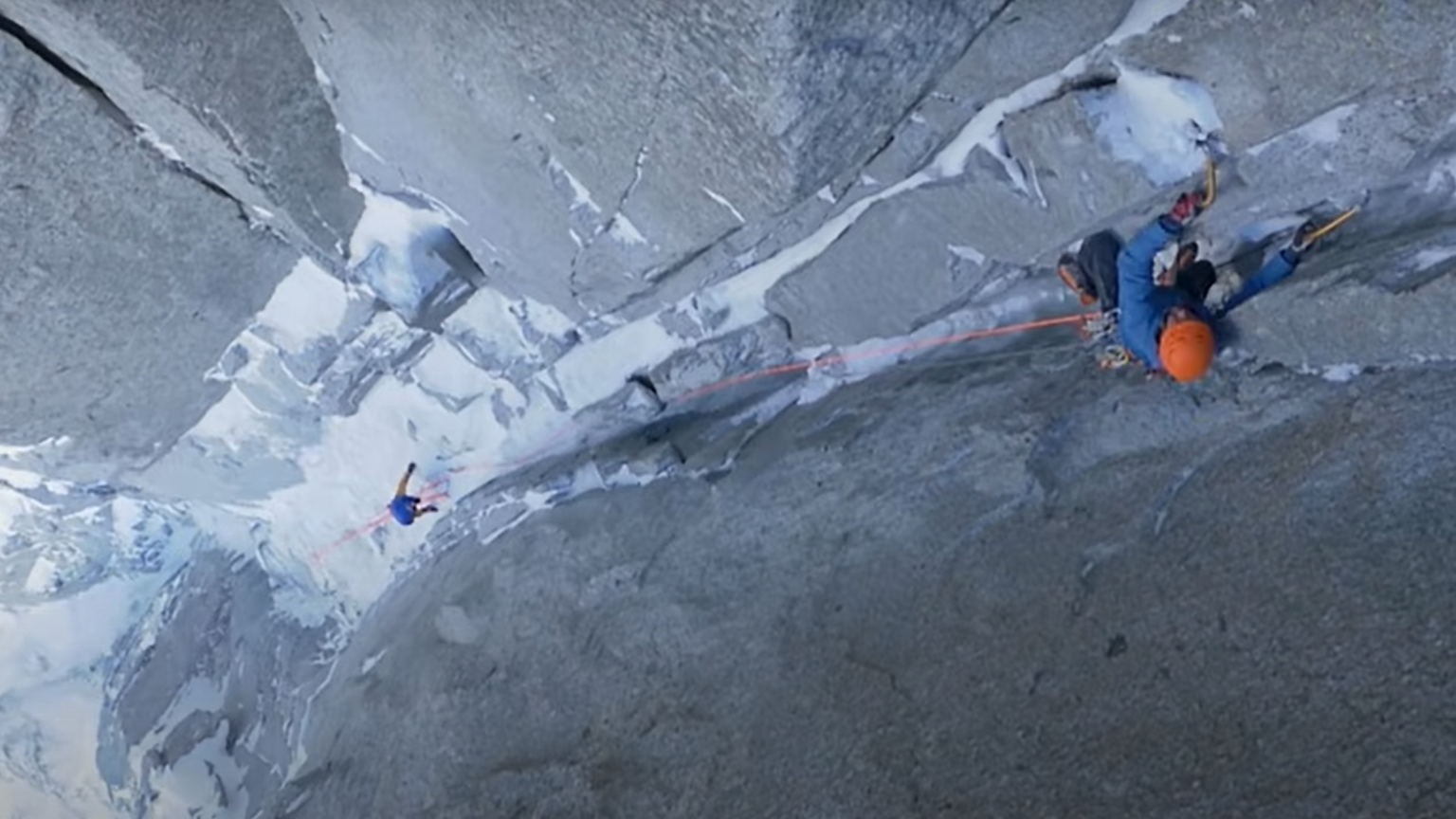
Lead climbing pair mixed climbing on an alpine climbing route, on Les Drus

While lead climbing is typically associated with rock climbing, it is also performed in other climbing disciplines such as in ice climbing, in mixed climbing and in dry-tooling. Lead climbing also features in alpine climbing, which is a climbing discipline that combines several individual disciplines including rock climbing and ice climbing. Because alpine climbing takes place on long multi-pitch routes that can have a lot of variation in the challenges presented on the individual pitches, in places, the alpine climbers will also use simul climbing techniques instead of lead climbing, to move faster along the long route. Using simul climbing significantly increases the risks to the climbers, and the technique is normally only used on terrain that both climbers are very comfortable with, where a fall is very unlikely.

== See also ==
- History of rock climbing
- List of grade milestones in rock climbing
