= Auto belay =

Mechanical belay device

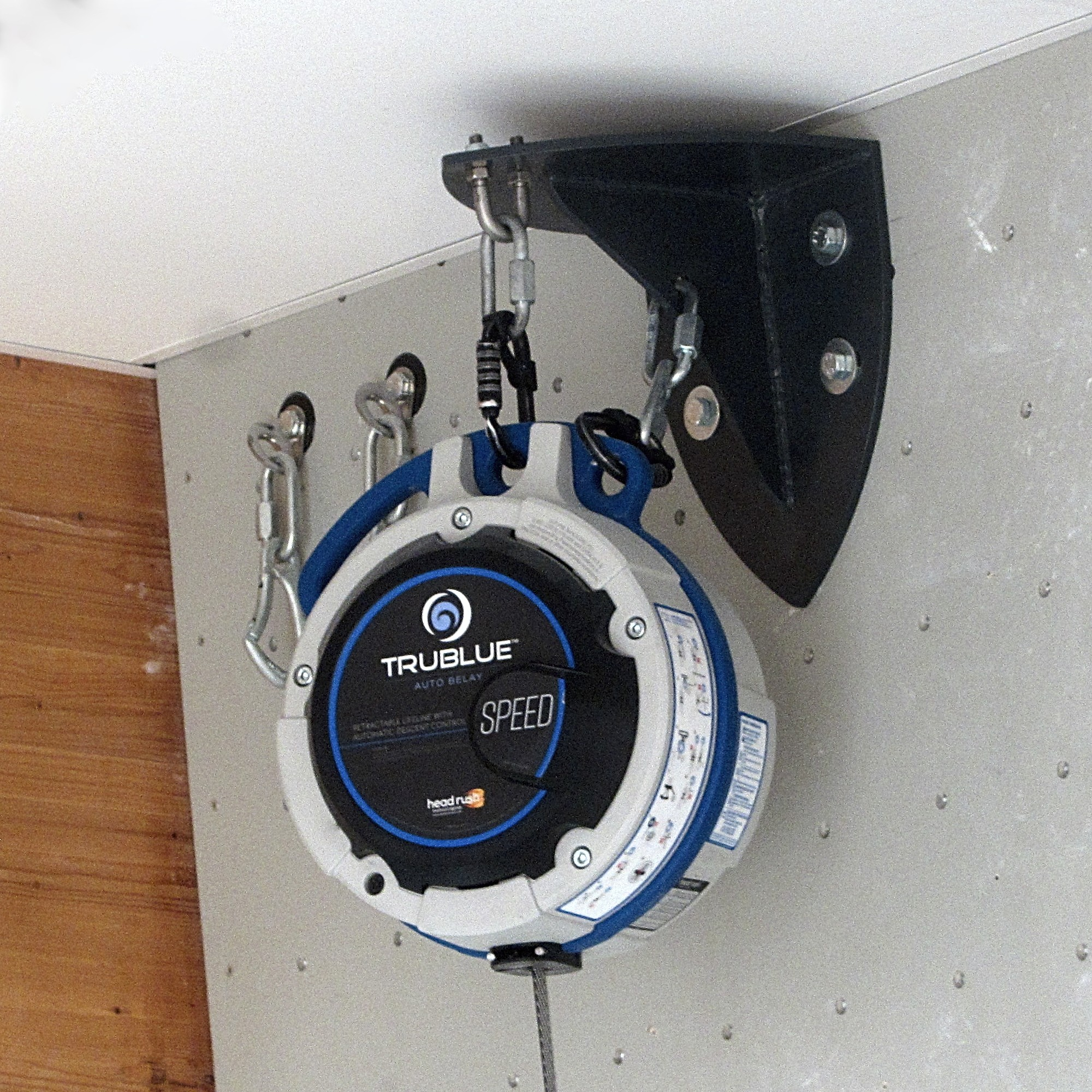
An auto-belay fixed at the top of an indoor climbing route

An auto belay (or autobelay) is a mechanical device for belaying in indoor climbing walls, in both training and competition climbing formats. The device enables a climber to ascend indoor routes on a top rope but without the need for a human belaying partner. The device, which is permanently mounted in a fixed position at the top of the route, winds up a tape or steel wire to which the ascending climber is attached. When the ascending climber sits back, or falls, the auto belay automatically brakes and smoothly lowers the climber to the ground.

== Types ==
=== Braking ===
Eddy current brake

Braking methods are electromagnetic, hydraulic, and based on centrifugal force. The electro-magnetic method uses the Eddy current brake principle. It requires a conductive disk that rotates through the magnetic field of a strong permanent magnet. When the disk moves, the magnet exerts a drag force on the metal which opposes its motion, due to circular electric currents called eddy currents induced in the metal by the magnetic field. The braking force is proportional to the weight of the climber. As the magnet and disk are not in mechanical contact, this system does not wear off from braking.

The hydraulic method employs a closed system filled with oil and pressurized air. The braking effect is created by a valve, limiting the oil flow. The system does not adjust to the weight of the climber and is difficult to maintain

The method employing the centrifugal force moves braking pads against a drum when the system rotates during descent. The wear-and-tear is the highest for this method.

=== Lead ===
While traditional auto belays use a top roping format with the device hanging from the top of the route, in 2021, a new type of auto belay–the lead auto belay–was developed that used a lead climbing format (i.e. the climber clipped into the quickdraws like a normal lead climb on a sport climbing route), where the device was fixed to the bottom of the route.

== Operation ==
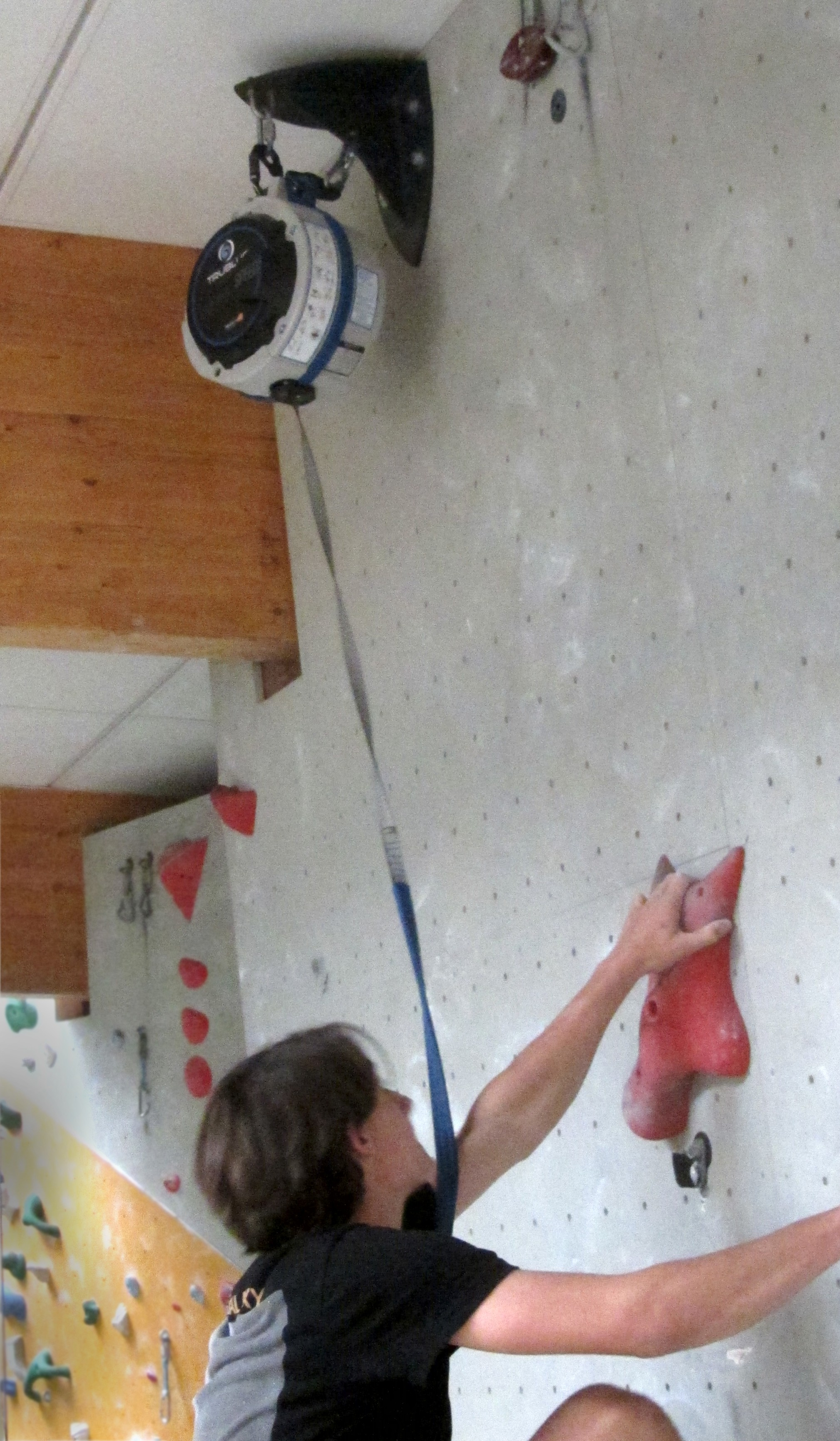
Climber on a competition speed climbing route with autobelay

The main purpose of auto belay devices is the immediate capture of a falling climber, and the controlled descent of the climber once the route is finished (or after the climber has fallen). While a human belay partner is able to tighten the rope on the climber's demand to allow the climber to take a rest on the route before re-trying a sequence (i.e. hangdogging), the auto belay will not "hold" the climber and will instead begin to lower the climber smoothly as soon as they lose contact with the wall.

Some newer devices contain a secondary braking system and electronic communication, allowing climbers to remain on the wall after a fall without immediately lowering ("catch-and-hold" mode). This rest period allows climbers to "project" more difficult routes in a style that is more similar to top roping with a human belay partner.

The climber's rate of ascent must not exceed the speed at which the device takes in the wire or tape, to avoid creating slack. Devices specifically for competition speed climbing are therefore constructed with a very quick take-in time, i.e. 15 m in 3.2–3.5 s, which is faster than the world record.

== Dangers ==
There have been a number of serious, and some fatal, accidents regarding the use of auto belay devices in indoor climbing walls. Reasons include:

- Tired climbers forgetting to re-clip into the auto belay wire or tape on a route that they are continuously repeating.
- Devices no longer retracting the tape or wire lanyard, either because they are jammed or the spring is broken. When the climber continues the ascent, this creates slack, thus as the lanyard is not designed to absorb energy, the climber and the device are shock-loaded.
- Assembly mistakes during installation or after maintenance.

To mitigate these risks, climbers are recommended to take a test fall early in the process of climbing at a height that is sufficiently high that the device will engage fully, but at which falling would be less serious than at a greater height.

== Standards ==
- EN 360:2002: Personal protective equipment against falls from a height - Retractable type fall arresters
- EN 341:2011 Class 1A: Personal protective equipment against falls from a height – Descender devices

== See also ==
- Competition speed climbing
- Competition ice climbing
- Rock-climbing equipment
- Top rope climbing
