= Belay device =

Mechanical piece of climbing equipment

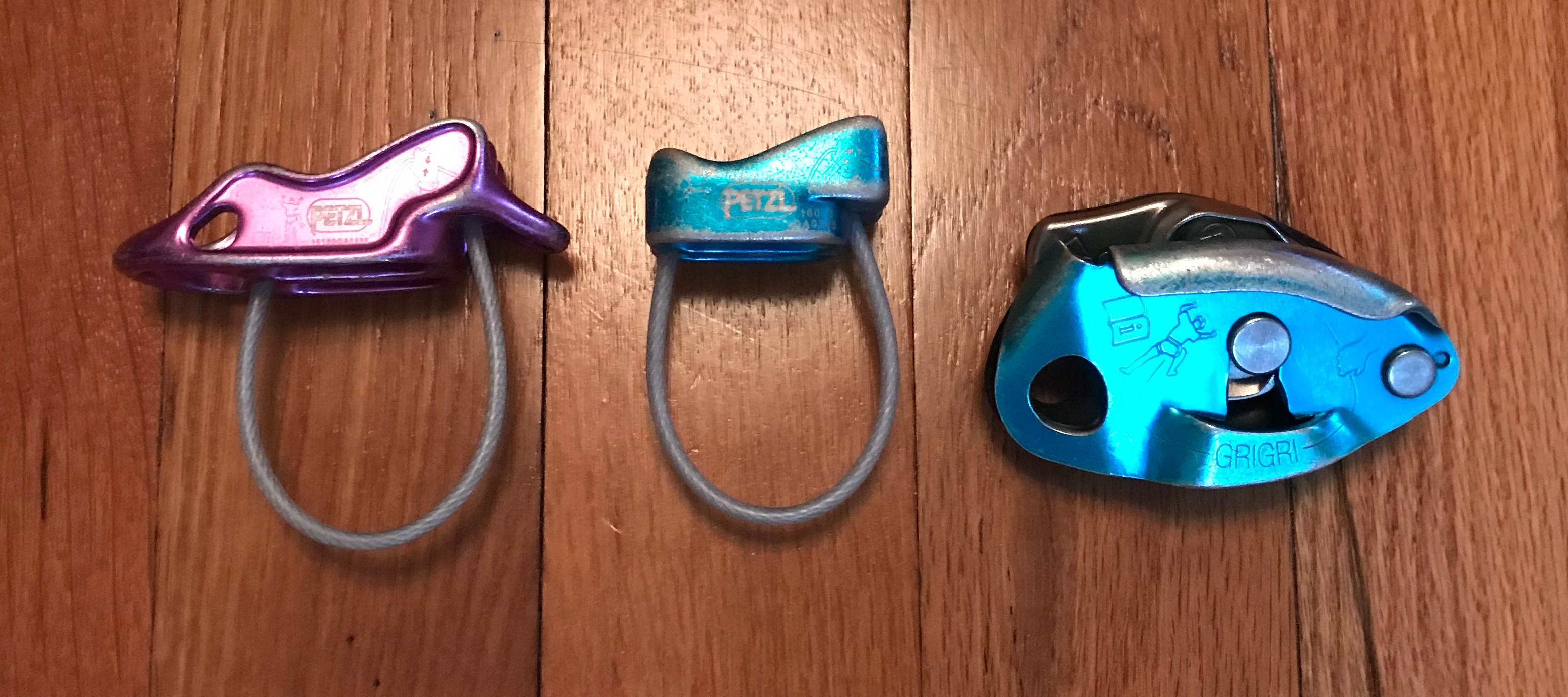
Petzl Reverso, Verso, GRIGRI

A belay device is a mechanical piece of climbing equipment used to control a rope during belaying. It is designed to improve belay safety for the climber by allowing the belayer to manage their duties with minimal physical effort. Belay devices act as a friction brake, assisting the belayer in arresting motion of the rope when a climber falls.

Typically, when the rope is held outward, away from the body, it moves relatively freely, so the belayer can take up or pay out slack. When the rope is brought backward, to the side of the body, the rope is forced into tight bends and rubs against the device and/or against itself, allowing the belayer to arrest the descent of a climber in the case of a fall. This rubbing slows the rope, but also generates heat. Some types of belay devices can arrest a fall without the belayer taking any action, while others require the belayer to hold or pull the rope in a particular direction.

Belay devices usually attach to the harness of the belayer via a carabiner, and are usually made of aluminium or an alloy. Some belay devices can also be used as descenders for a controlled descent on a rope, that is abseiling or rappeling.

Many belay devices can be used to control either one rope, or two ropes in parallel. There are many reasons why the two-rope option might be chosen by a climber, including the consideration of reducing rope drag.

There are also auto-belay devices on the market which allow a climber to climb solo in their climbing gym.

== Types ==
=== Aperture ===
This is a device that you feed a bight (loop) of rope through a hole or aperture and then clip it into a carabiner on the harness.

==== Sticht plate ====
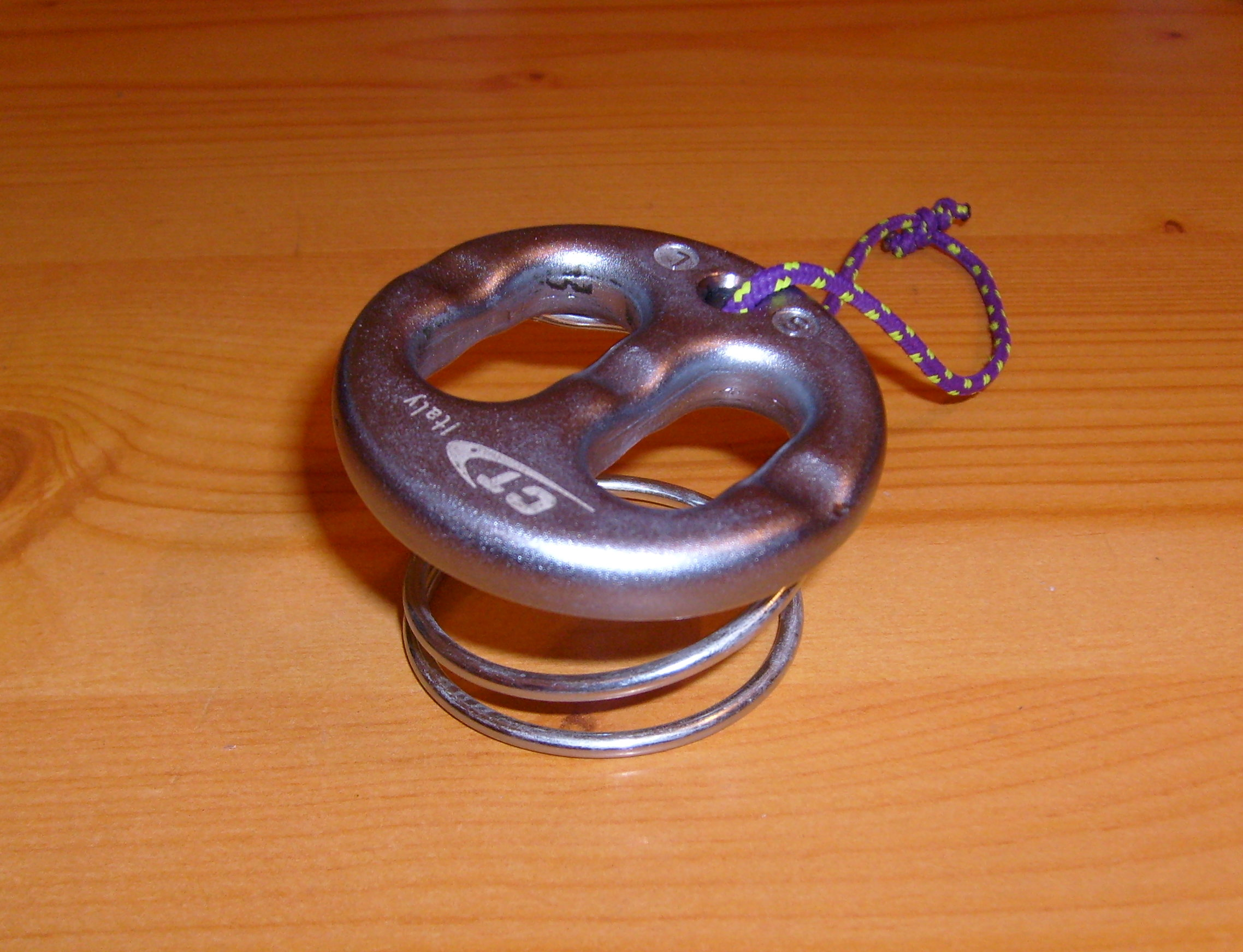
Sticht plate.

The Sticht plate was the first mechanical rope brake, named after its designer, Fritz Sticht. It consists of a small metal plate with a slot that allows a bight of rope to pass through to a locking carabiner and back out. This locking carabiner is clipped to the belayer who is then able to arrest the rope at will.

Some plates had two slots for double ropes. The slots could also be different sizes for different diameter ropes e.g. 9 mm and 11 mm. A wide wire spring may be attached on one side to help keep the plate away from the brake carabiner to ease feeding and taking in rope. A smaller hole is often present for accessory cord to carry the device. Sticht plates are typically forged from aluminium alloy in a round disc shape, although other shapes such as rounded rectangles were also made.

Although any belaying plate with one or two slots is often called a Sticht plate, Fritz Sticht originally patented the design with Hermann Huber for Salewa GmbH in 1970, who sell it as the Salewa Sticht Bremse (Sticht Brake).

Sticht plates have become less popular since more modern designs provide smoother control over the rope and are less prone to jamming, especially when doubling as a descender.

==== Tubular ====
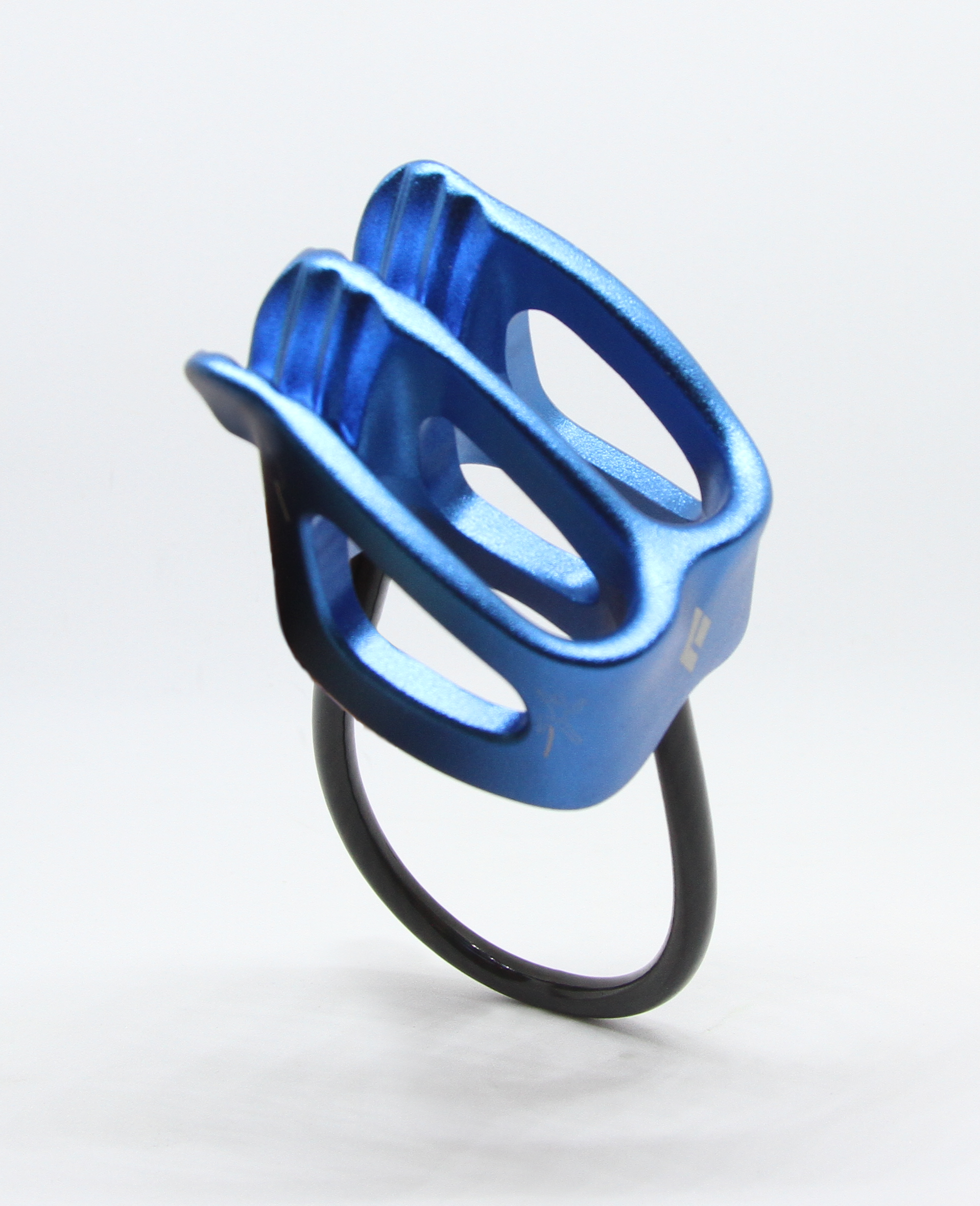
A Tubular Belay device

Also called a "tube", this type of device generally has a tubular or rectangular shape. It is an evolution of the Sticht plate's concept by creating more surface area to dissipate heat and the ability to create sharper angles which creates a stronger degree of friction which has greater stopping power. As a result, this is generally the most common type of belay device used. The most common form of this kind of tubular belay device is the ATC, an acronym for "air traffic controller".

Besides arresting the fall of a climber, these devices can also be used for rappelling. Climbers can control rope descent and arrest falls by creating friction between the device and the rope.

==== Figure eight ====
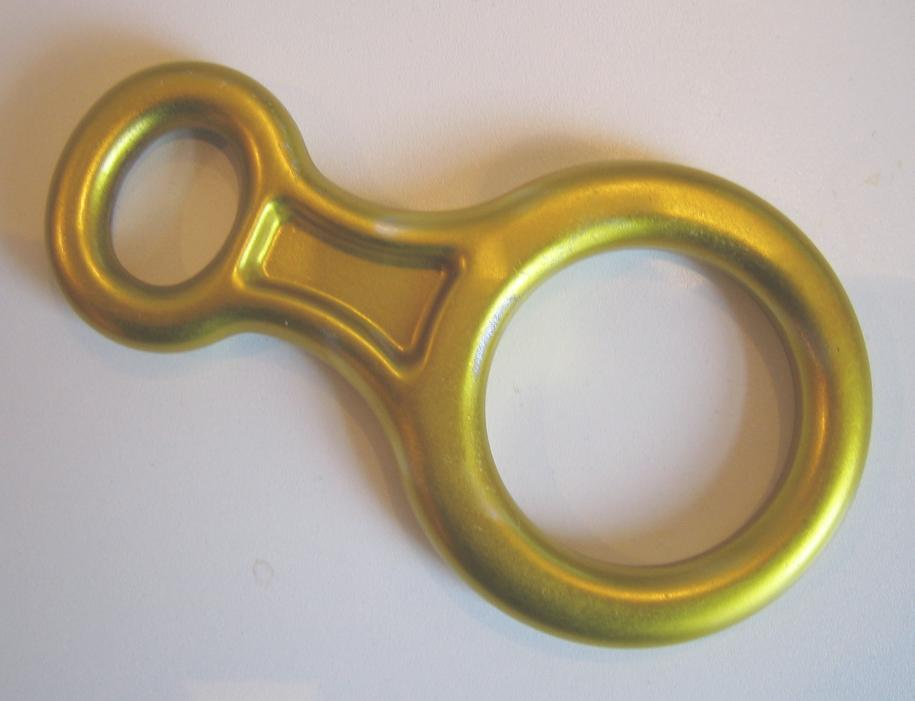
A figure-eight descender.

Sometimes just called an "eight", this device is most commonly used as a descender. A figure eight belay devices are used for belaying. There are some which are designed specifically for belaying, however they are not generally popular due to the tendency to twist the rope. There are also variations on this design including DMM's "cardiac arrester" which does the same thing but in which the larger loop is shaped like a heart. It is designed to help stop rope twisting. Figure eights, although not the most common belay device, are still frequently found in use. For most uses, a tubular style belay device is easier and safer to use. Due to their tendency to twist rope and general disagreement about their safety, figure eights are often banned in climbing gyms.

=== Assisted braking ===
Under the right conditions, assisted braking devices (ABDs) use a sudden load on the rope to engage a camming mechanism (known as active, or mechanically assisted braking devices) or pull the belay carabiner into a pinch point (known as passive, or geometrically assisted braking devices) to prevent the rope from passing through the belay device. The terms "self-" or "auto-locking" are discouraged, because it is necessary to always keep the brake hand on the rope, there being conditions outside the correct function of braking, for example icy, muddy, worn, or too-thin of a rope, and insufficient training and experience.

==== Guide plate ====
A guide plate, also known as an auto-blocking belay device, is a metal plate with an elongated slot for the bight to go through and then a carabiner is attached so that when pull from the climber occurs the carabiner will be pulled to lock off the device. Examples include the GiGi by Kong.

==== ATC in Guide Mode ====
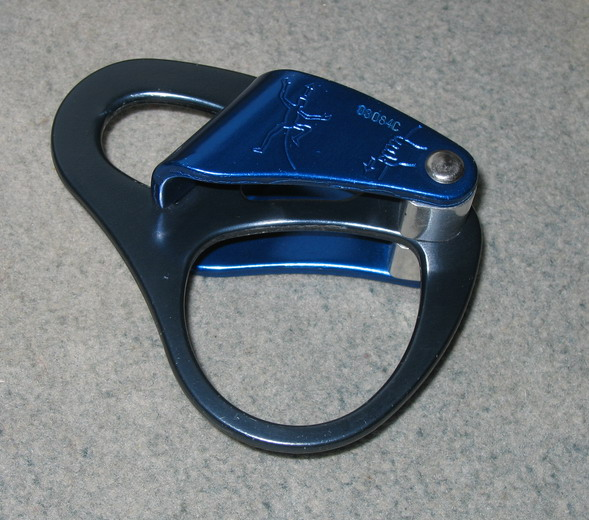
Petzl Reverso

A similar device to the traditional tubular belay device with two extra loops, normally situated on the front and back, that can also be used as a regular tubular device to belay from a harness. When the device is attached directly to an anchor point with the use of a second carabiner through the larger of the two loops it performs a similar stopping function to that created with the guide plate.

==== Grigri ====
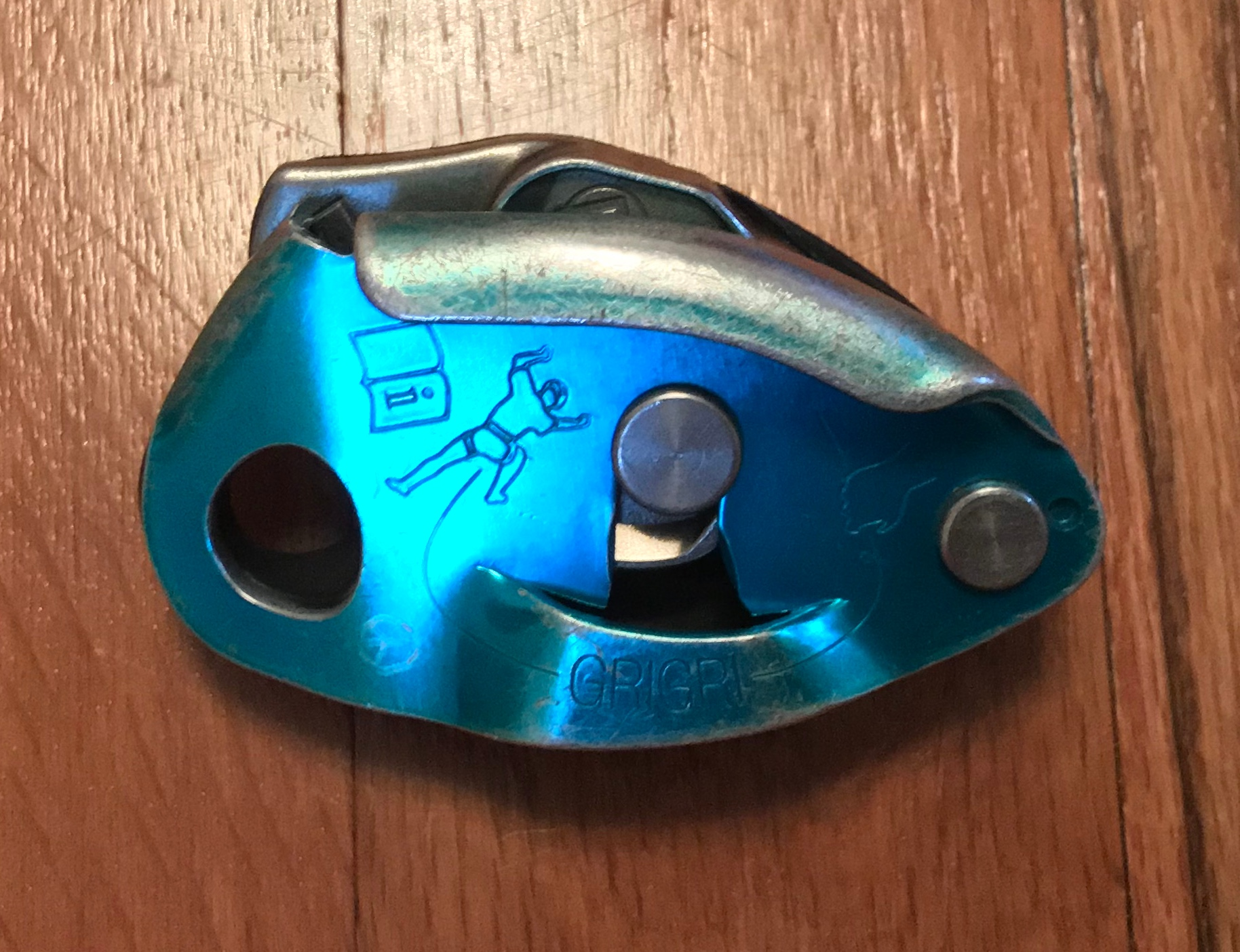
Petzl Grigri

One of the most popular devices, a Grigri (proprietary design by Petzl) assists in stopping a lead fall by using a camming device to create friction to quickly slow and stop the rope. Because of the braking mechanism, a variety of belay techniques are used, though Petzl has approved only certain techniques for instructing new belayers. Grigris reportedly give a harder catch than a regular belay device as they allow little to no rope slippage when catching a fall causing the person being belayed to fall a shorter distance.

The original Grigris were rated for 10 to 11 mm single ropes, while the newer, smaller Grigri 2 is rated for 8.9 to 11 mm single ropes and optimized for 9.4 to 10.3 mm ropes. There are a number of similar assisted braking belay devices, including the Petzl Neox, the Trango Vergo and the Cinch, among others, that cover a range of rope sizes.

Using a Grigri to bring up a second on a traditional anchor is however less favorable than other belay devices because the Grigri gives a more static catch with little to no rope slippage. This increases the amount of force exerted on the anchor which, in turn, increases the chance of anchor failure.

=== Self-belay ===
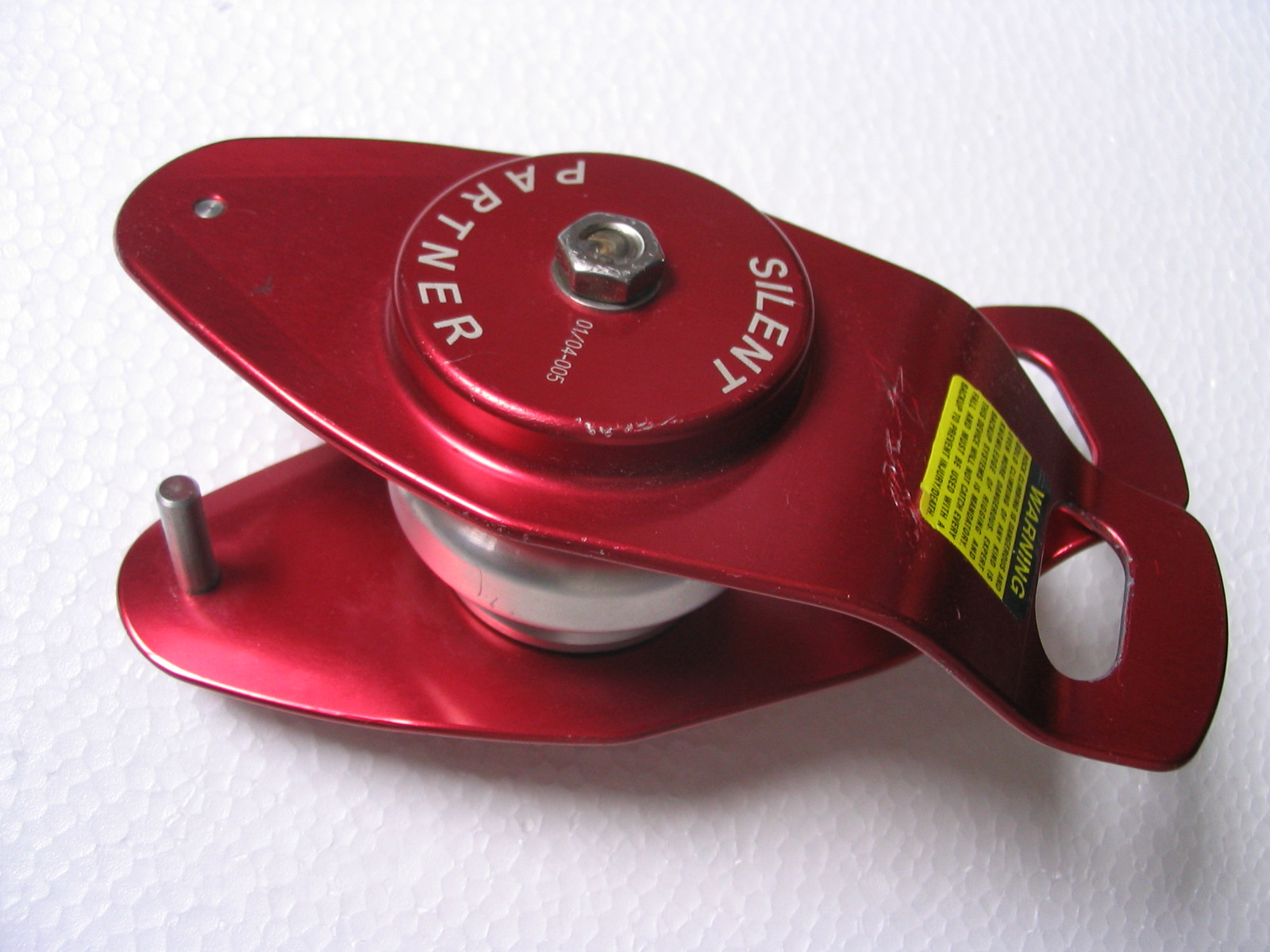
"Silent Partner" self-belay device.

Self-belay devices are designed to allow solo climbing where the climber wears the belay device, or secures it to a fixed object on the ground. These devices automatically lock without any intervention when the rope passing through reaches a sufficient velocity (during a fall), but allow rope to move relatively freely whilst climbing.

=== Auto-belay ===
Auto-belay devices belay climbers automatically, without needing a second person. They are typically used in commercial climbing walls.

An auto-belay device may operate using friction, centrifugal force, hydraulics, or magnetic braking technology. Auto-belay devices using magnetism as the main breaking mechanism are currently the most used, as they are self regulating. When a climber descends on a magnetic auto-belay, the speed of their descent is proportional to the climbers weight.

== See also ==
- Belaying
- Capstan equation
- Climbing
- Rock-climbing equipment
