= Belaying =

Rock climbing safety technique using ropes

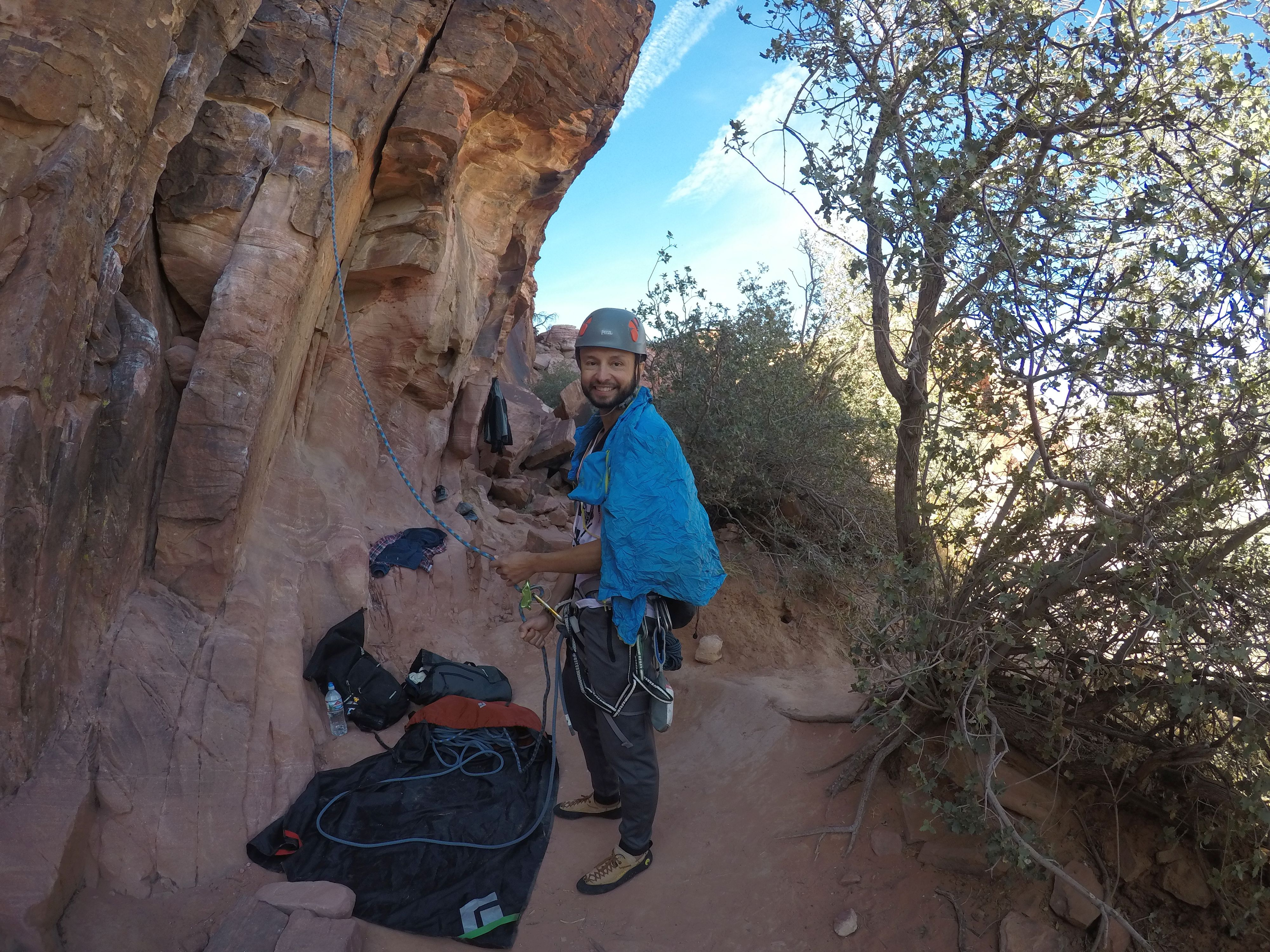
A belayer in Red Rocks, Nevada

In climbing and mountaineering, belaying comprises techniques used to create friction within a climbing protection system, particularly on a climbing rope, so that a falling climber does not fall very far. A climbing partner typically applies tension at the other end of the rope whenever the climber is not moving, and removes the tension from the rope whenever the climber needs more rope to continue climbing. The belay is the place where the belayer is anchored, which is typically on the ground, or on ledge (where it is also called a belay station) but may also be a hanging belay where the belayer themself is suspended from an anchor in the rock on a multi-pitch climb.

== Description ==
Belaying is a critical part of climbing safety. Correct belaying methods allow a belayer to hold the entire weight of the climber with relatively little force and easily arrest falls.

In its simplest form, a belay consists of a rope that runs from a climber to another person (the belayer) who can stop the climber's fall. In the modern day, most climbers use a variety of gear to belay, notably harnesses and belay devices. In a typical modern climbing setup, one end of the rope is fixed to the harness of the climber, most often by a figure-eight knot. The rope then passes through some form of climbing protection. Protection may come in the form of fixed protection, such as permanent pitons or bolts, or in the form of removable protection, such as nuts, hexes, and spring-loaded camming devices.

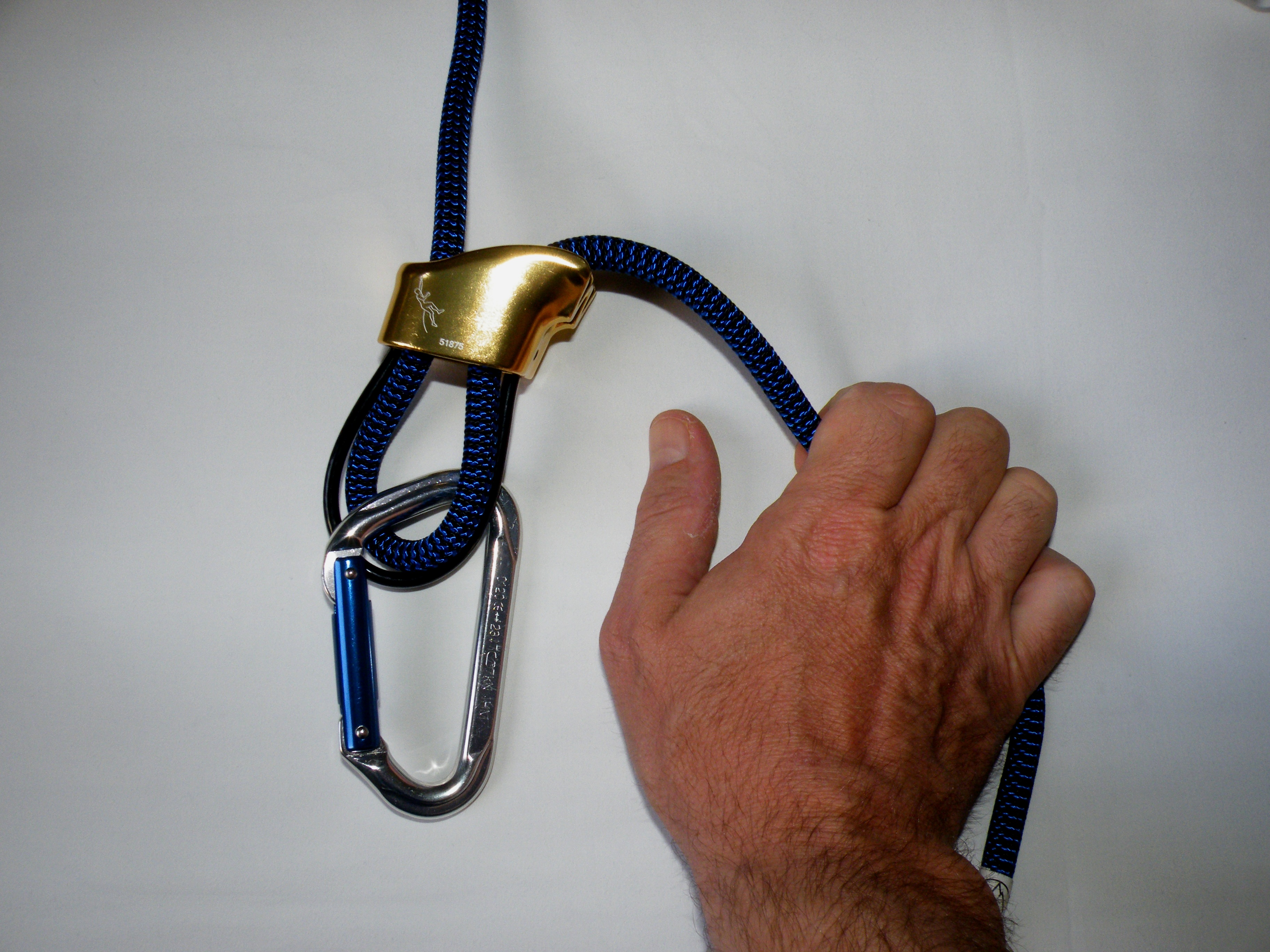
A demonstration of the belay device with rope and carabiner without a proper locking gate

The other end of the rope is attached to the belayer, who remains lower than the climber. The belayer wears a harness to which a belay device is attached. The belay device acts as a friction brake, and allows the belayer to easily vary the amount of friction on the rope by altering the rope's position. In one position, the rope runs freely through the belay device. In another position, it can be held without the rope sliding through the device because of the friction on the rope. This is called "locking off" the rope.

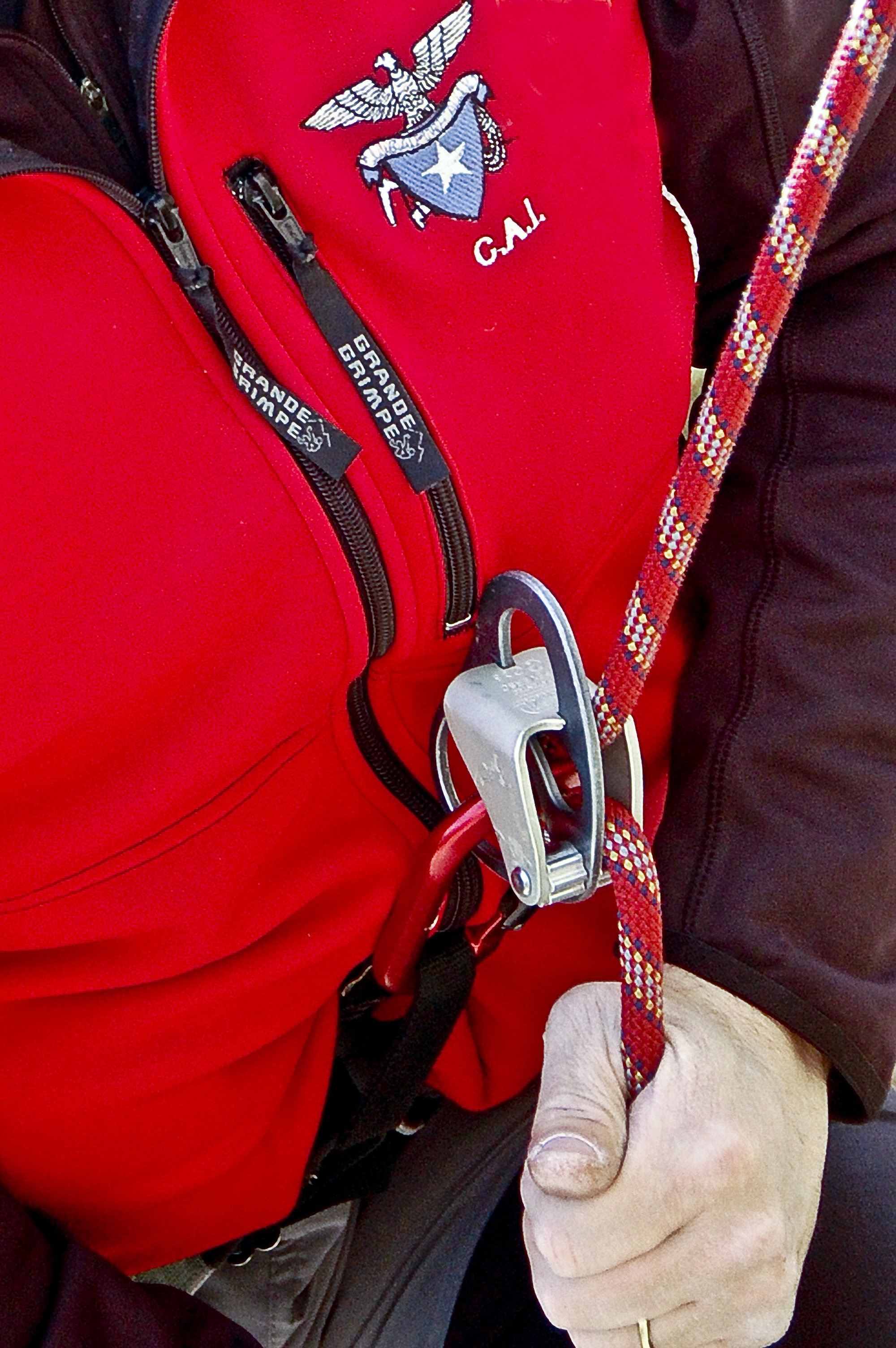
Belay device held in the "locked off" position.

While the rope is locked off, the climber's fall should be arrested and they will be left suspended, but safe, somewhere below the last piece of protection. Generally, the climber will not fall any farther than the length between them and their last piece of protection, plus the length of the rope between them and their last piece of protection, plus the length of any slack in the system and extra length from the stretching of the rope under load. That is, if a climber climbs three feet higher than the last piece of protection in the rock, and then falls, the climber will fall at least six feet in total: three to the protection, and three below that, and then an extra distance for the extra rope stretch. A dynamic rope is usually used so that the climber is not brought to a sudden jarring stop.

After a climber falls, the belayer can gently lower the climber to a safe point where climbing can be resumed. When a climber is finished climbing, belayers can lower climbers to the ground safely.

== Belayer responsibilities ==
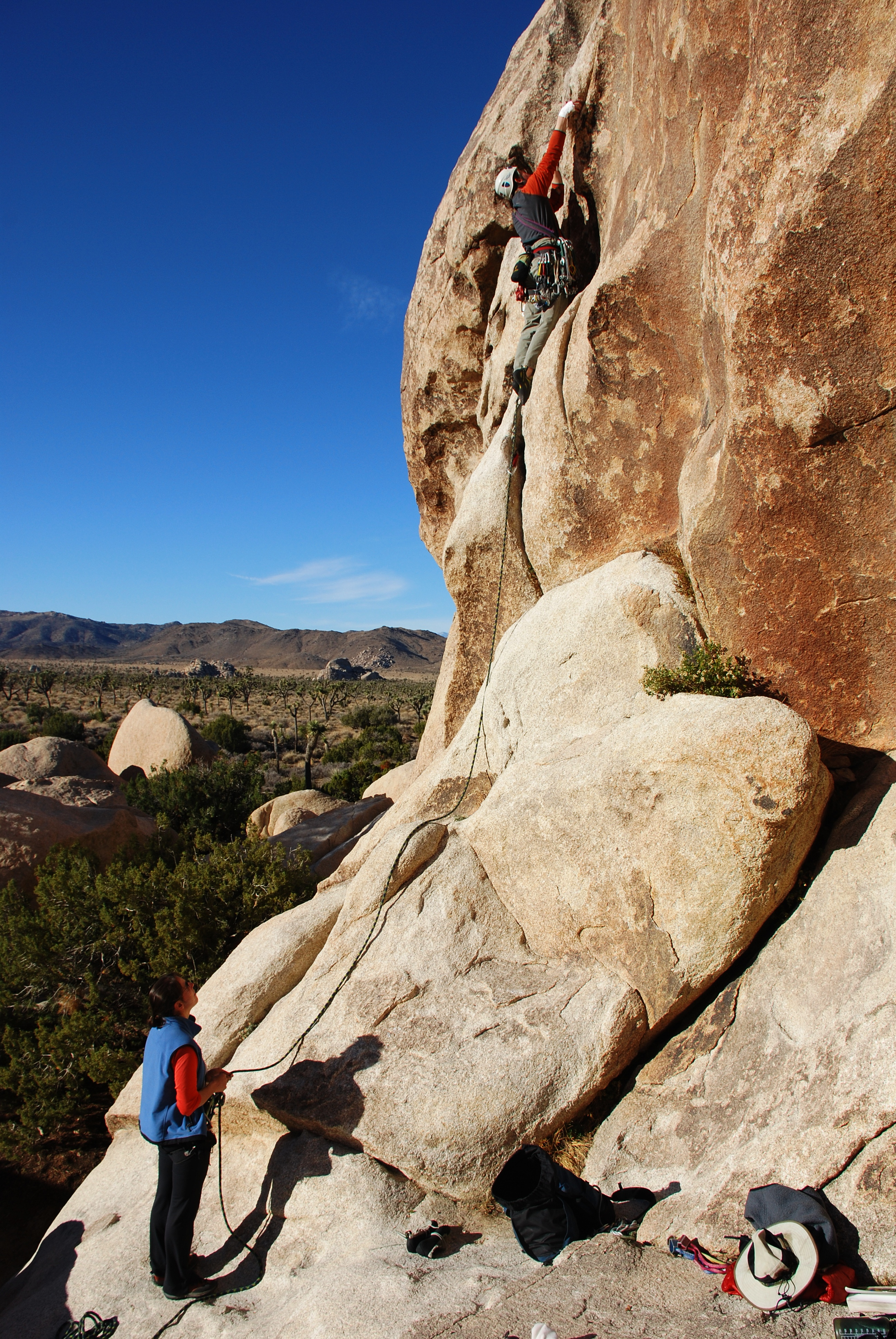
Leader and belayer climbing in Joshua Tree National Park

The belayer should keep the rope locked off in the belay device whenever the climber is not moving. As the climber moves on the climb, the belayer must make sure that the climber has the right amount of rope by paying out or pulling in excess rope. If the climber falls, they free-fall the distance of the slack or unprotected rope before the friction applied by the belayer starts to slow their descent. Too much slack on the rope increases the distance of a possible fall, but too little slack on the rope may cause the climber to "whip" or swing into the rock at a high velocity, possibly injuring themselves. It is important for the belayer to closely monitor the climber's situation, as the belayer's role is crucial to the climber's safety.

When belaying on overhanging bolted routes, particularly indoors, belayers often stand well back from the rock so that they can watch the climber more easily. However, when belaying a lead climber who is using traditional protection, this can be very dangerous. The belayer should stand near to the bottom of the route in order to decrease the angle of the rope through the first piece of protection. This, in turn, decreases the force pulling it up and out of the rock if the leader falls. Standing too far away from the rock can result in protection unzipping, with the lowest piece being pulled away from the rock, followed by the next, until all of the protection may potentially be pulled out. Standing too far away from the bottom of the climb also means that if the leader falls, the belayer experiences a sudden pull inwards towards the rock and may be pulled off their feet or into the rock.

== Communication ==
Communication is also extremely important in belaying. Climbers should wait for verbal confirmation from the belayer that they are ready to begin.

=== US terminology ===
A climber is said to be "on belay" when they are correctly attached to the rope and the rope is correctly attached to the belayer by an appropriate belay method. Commonly-used commands in US climbing communities are:

| "On belay?" | Asked by the climber to confirm if the belayer is ready. |
| "Belay on." | Said by the belayer to confirm that the belayer is ready and that the climber is on belay. |
| "Climbing." | Said by the climber to indicate they are starting their climb. |
| "Climb on." | Said by the belayer to acknowledge the climber is starting their climb. |
| "Off belay." | Said by the climber to indicate they are safe, either on the ground or attached to an anchor, and do not need to be on belay. |
| "Belay off." | Said by the belayer to indicate the climber is no longer on belay. |
| "Take." | Said by the climber to tell the belayer to remove the slack from the rope, and warn that the climber is going to put weight on the rope. |
| "Got you." | Said by the belayer to confirm that the slack has been removed from the rope and they are ready for the climber's weight. |
| "Give me slack."/"Slack." | Said by the climber to request more slack (less tension) in the rope. |
| "Lower me."/"Lower." | Said by the climber to indicate that they are finished with their climb and would like the belayer to lower them to the ground. |
| "Lowering." | Said by the belayer to confirm that they will lower the climber. |
| "Watch me." | Said by the climber to request special attention from the belayer and indicate they may fall. |
| "Falling!" | Said by the climber when falling. |
| "Rock!" | Said by anybody when they see a falling rock. It is best practice that everyone in the climbing area repeat this when they hear it. |

At times, it may be impossible for climbing partners to hear one another, as in bad weather, by the sea, or near a busy road. Silent belay communication is possible by tugging the rope. These are not standardized and should be communicated between the belayer and the climber prior to the climb. Walkie-talkies can be used in areas where communication is limited.

=== UK terminology ===
When the climber is tied onto the rope and is ready to climb "Ready to climb"

When the belayer has attached the rope to the belay device and is ready to belay "Climb when ready" (or in recent years, "On belay" or "Belay ready")

When the climber is about to start climbing, "Climbing"

When the belayer is belaying, "OK"

When the slack rope is taken in by the belayer and it becomes tight and therefore the belayer doesn't need to take the rope in any more the climber says "That's me"

During the climb, the climber may ask the belayer for "Slack", or to take in the rope "Take in" (the command "Take in slack" is never used as it could be misinterpreted)

If the climber is about to fall and needs the belayer to know & take in the rope, they may say "Tight" for a tight rope or "Take In" to take the rope in.

When the climber is in a safe position independent of the belay "Safe" or "I'm safe".

When the belayer has taken the climber off the belay "Off belay"

Warning shouts for falling objects, "Rope!"; when throwing a rope off the edge "Rock!"; when a rock has been dislodged and is falling.

== Anchoring ==
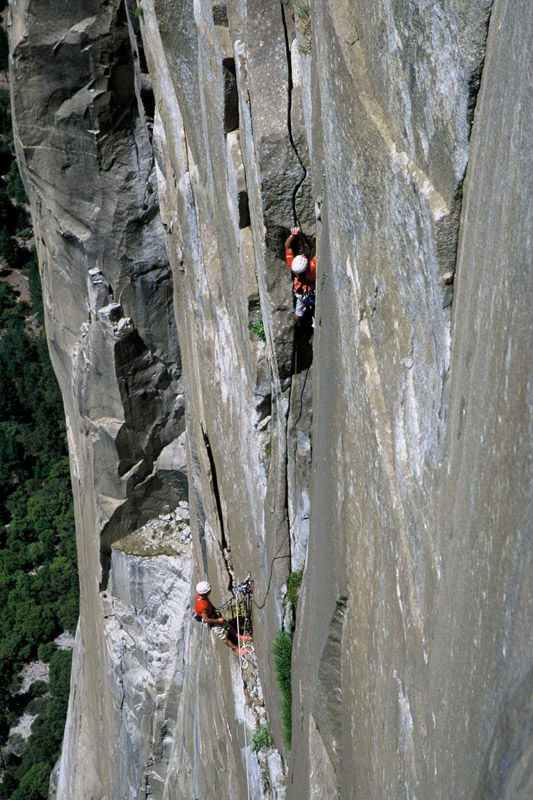
Lead climber and belayer (in a hanging belay position) on the multi-pitch El Niño 8b (5.13d), El Capitan

When top rope belaying for a significantly heavier partner, it is sometimes recommended that the belayer anchor themselves to the ground. The anchor point does not prevent a fall, but prevents the belayer from being pulled upwards during a fall. This is normally not used when lead belaying.

To set up this anchor the belayer should place a piece of directional protection (i.e., a nut or cam) into a crack below their body, or tie themselves by the belay loop to a rock or tree. The anchor arrests any upward force produced during a fall thus preventing the belayer from "taking off". Unlike belays set up at the top of a climb, it is not usually necessary for belayers at the bottom to have more than one point of protection as long as the single piece is sturdy and safe – "bomber" in climber jargon.

=== Hanging belay ===
During multipitch climbs it is sometimes necessary to belay while sitting in a harness and anchored to the wall. In this case rope management becomes more important, and the anchor is constructed in the traditional manner.

== Belay methods ==
Climbers now almost exclusively use a belay device to achieve controllable rope friction. Before the invention of these devices, climbers used other belay methods, which are still useful in emergencies.

The person climbing is said to be on belay when one of these belaying methods is used.

=== Belay devices ===
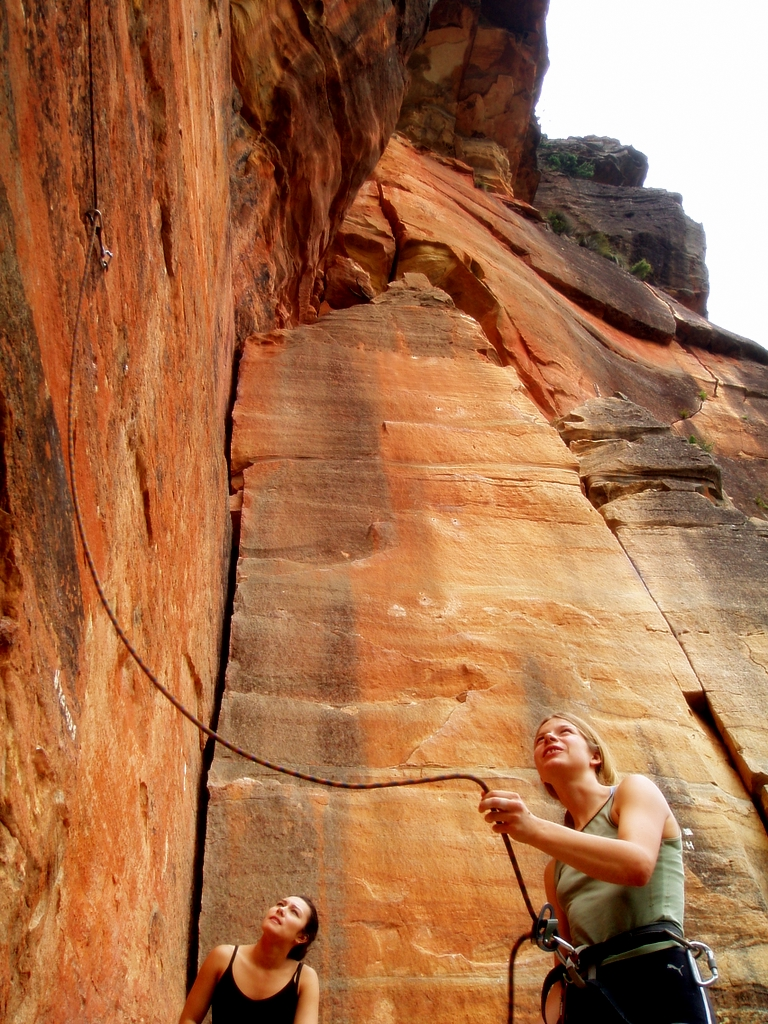
A belayer using a belay device.

A belay device is a piece of climbing equipment that improves belay safety for the climber by allowing the belayer to manage his or her duties with minimal physical effort. Belay devices are designed to allow a weak person to easily arrest a climber's fall with maximum control, while avoiding twisting, heating or severely bending the rope.

=== Self-belay ===
While the task of belaying is typically assigned to a companion who stays at the bottom, self-belaying is also possible as an advanced technical climbing technique.

=== Munter hitch / Italian hitch ===
A munter hitch is a belaying method that creates a friction brake by tying a special knot around an appropriate carabiner. This type of belay, however, causes the rope to become twisted. It can also be used on double ropes. Simply tie the munter hitch with both ropes as if they were one.

=== Body belay ===
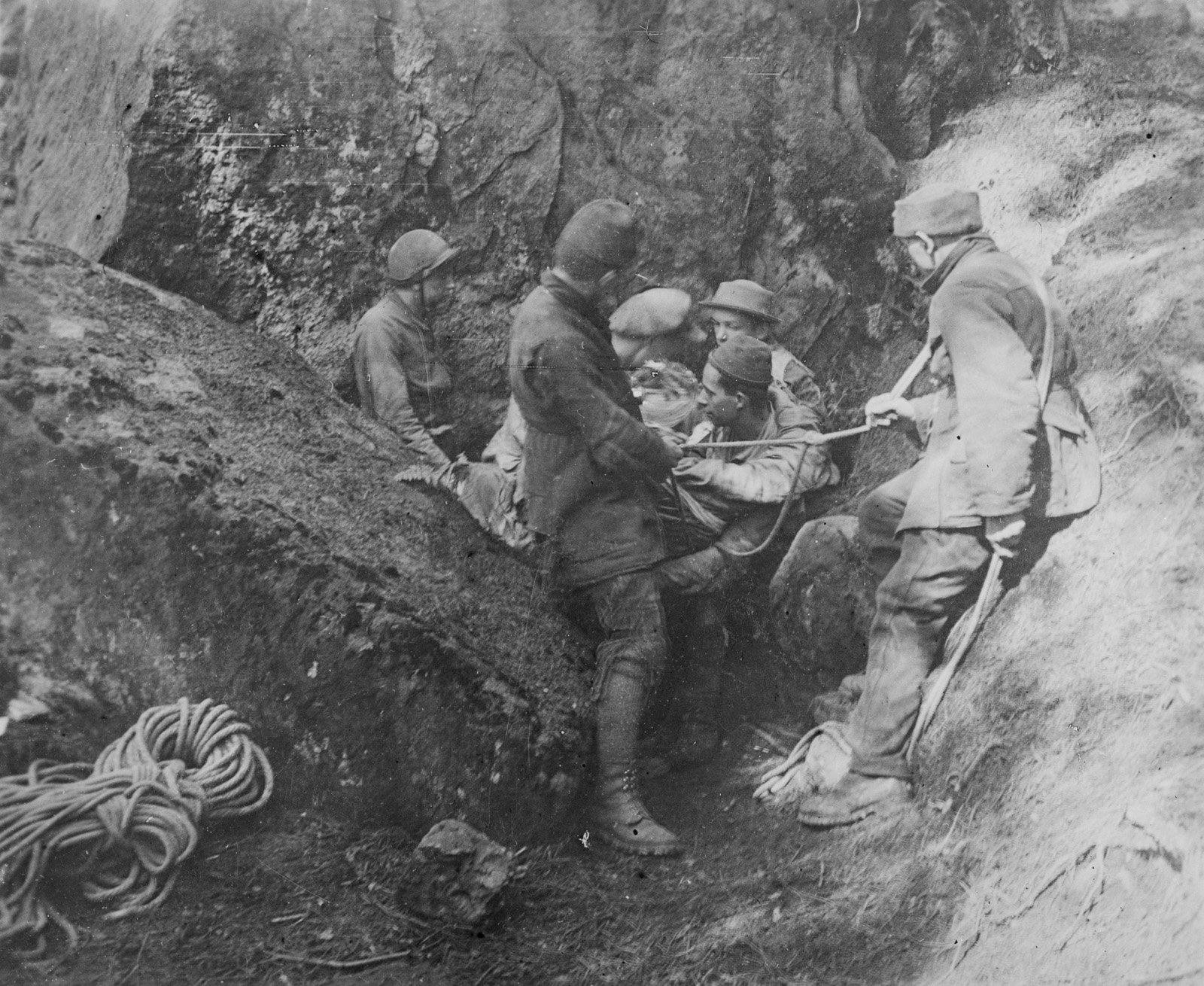
Body belay during rescue training in Switzerland in 1924

Before the invention of belay devices, belayers could add friction to the rope by wrapping it around their body; friction between rope and the belayer's body was used to arrest a fall. This is known as a body belay, a hip belay, or a waist belay and is still sometimes used when climbing quickly over easier ground. On vertical rock it is no longer used as it is less reliable and more apt to injure the belayer stopping a long fall.

=== Australian belay ===
The Australian belay is used on many high ropes courses for supporting participants on vertical, as opposed to traversing, elements. The Australian belay allows untrained participants to engage in the safety and support of their fellow participants on an element, and allows a single facilitator to oversee an element with multiple individuals participating. The Australian belay does not use a traditional belay device, but rather ties two or more people into loops on the working end of the rope as a belay team, who walk backward as the participant ascends the element, taking up slack as they go. Additional participants can be tied into the loops or left free to help hold clipped in members of the belay team in place. The Australian belay requires a clear runway back from the element almost double the height of the element in order to allow the belay team to support climbers all the way to the top.

== See also ==
- Capstan equation
