= Kernmantle rope =

Type of rope

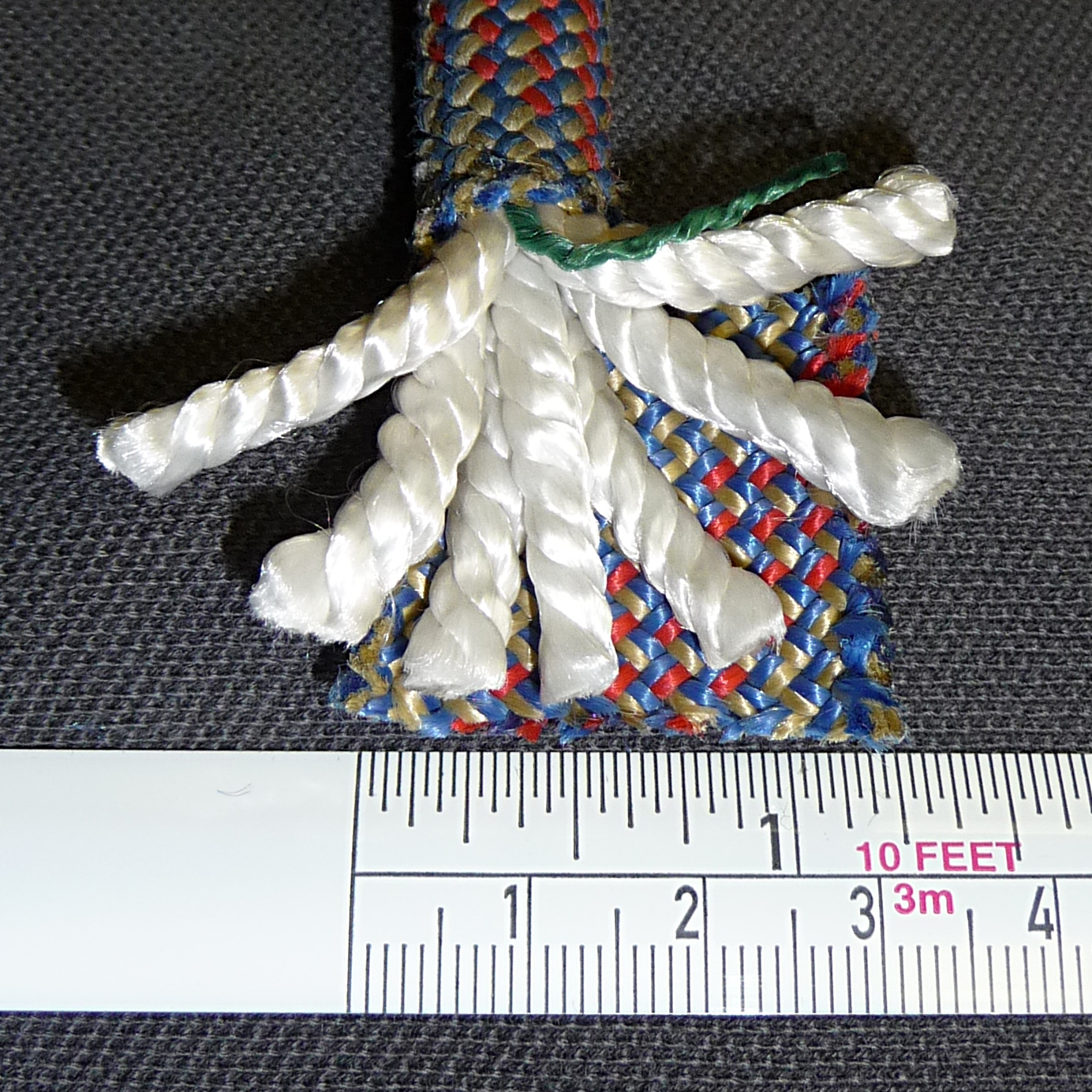
Internal structure of a 10.7 mm dynamic kernmantle climbing rope

Kernmantle rope (from German Kern 'core' and Mantel 'sheath') is rope constructed with its interior core protected by a woven exterior sheath designed to optimize strength, durability, and flexibility. The core fibers provide the tensile strength of the rope, while the sheath protects the core from abrasion during use. This is the only construction of rope that is considered to be life safety rope by most fire and rescue services.

== Parachute cord ==
Parachute cord or paracord (also known as 550 cord when referring to type-III paracord) is a lightweight nylon kernmantle rope originally used in the suspension lines of parachutes. This cord is useful for many other tasks and is now used as a general purpose utility cord by both military personnel and civilians.

== Use as climbing rope ==
One of the uses of kernmantle rope is as climbing rope.

Nylon ropes that were used in yachts for hauling were tested and found useful in climbing and caving and are now the modern standard. The German company Edelrid introduced the first kernmantel rope in 1953, which revolutionized fall prevention. Hemp climbing rope became a thing of the past and rope breakage was greatly reduced. In 1964, Edelrid and Mammut both developed dynamic ropes capable of withstanding multiple falls. These became the forerunner of the modern dynamic climbing rope. Although there were occasional innovations, the rope used today is similar in construction, strength, and durability across manufacturers. Overall there is a huge variety of climbing ropes available for different purposes; for instance, there are well over one hundred different dynamic single ropes (the most popular rope system in climbing). Kernmantle ropes are still used in sailing and other sports, but the technical requirements are usually not as rigorous for such purposes as for climbing. Small kernmantle ropes are commonly called accessory cords; they are often used to make prusik knots and loops or to attach accessories such as chalk bags.

Depending upon the ultimate use of the rope, one or more of its many characteristics (material, structure, finish, color, strength, durability, elasticity, flexibility, price, etc.) are altered, sometimes at the expense of other properties. For example, rope used in caving is generally exposed to increased abrasion, so the mantle is woven more tightly than rope used in climbing or rappelling. However, the resulting rope is cumbersome and difficult to tie knots in.

Kernmantle construction may be used for both static and dynamic ropes. Static ropes are designed to allow relatively little stretch, which is most useful for applications such as hauling and rappelling. Dynamic rope is used to belay climbers, and is designed to stretch under a heavy load to absorb the shock of a fallen climber. Dynamic ropes manufactured for climbing are tested by the UIAA. A test of "single" standard rope involves tying an 80 kg (176 pound) weight to the end of a length of rope. This weight is then dropped 5 meters (16½ feet) on 2.7 meters (9 feet) of rope, with the rope running over a rounded surface simulating that of a standard carabiner. This process is repeated until the rope breaks. For "double" ropes the weight is 55 kg, and for "twin" ropes two strands are used, and the requirements are the same as for a single rope --and twin ropes typically endure more drops. In addition to the number of drops, the impact force is also measured. It is a common misunderstanding to think that the number of drop test falls (as conducted by the UIAA) is the number of real-life climbing falls a rope can sustain before it becomes unsafe. The drop test falls are of extreme severity and a real-life climbing fall will not often generate a comparable force. This adds a margin of safety for climbers who use such ropes as the ropes age.

== Rope care ==
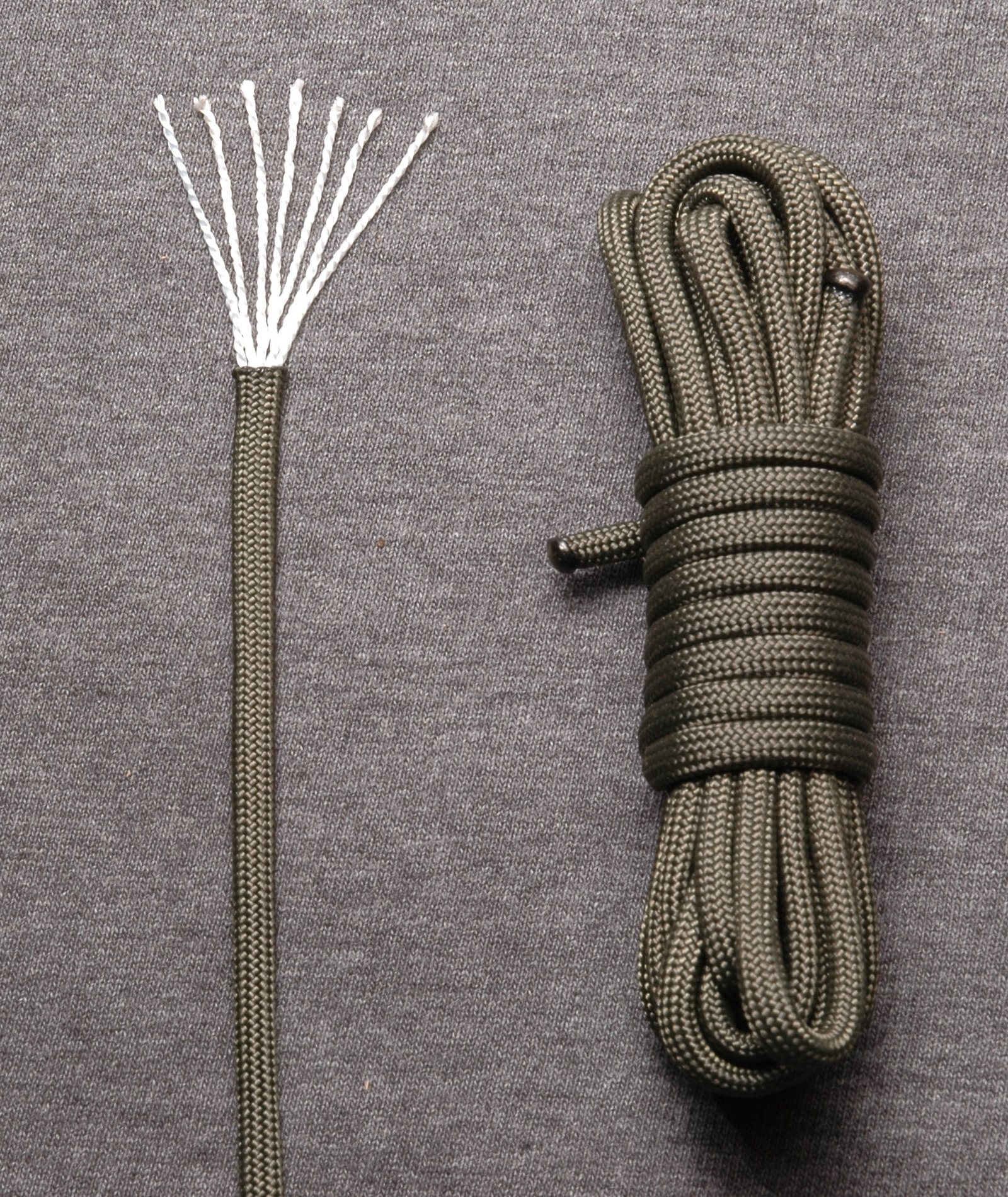
Parachute cord is a type of lightweight nylon kernmantle rope. The kern of this particular example is made up of seven two-ply yarns; the mantle is braided from 32 strands.

Kernmantle rope should be inspected before and after every use for any form of damage. "Boogers", which indicate internal damage to the kern, appear as tufts of white threads poking out from the mantle. Ropes that have been severely stressed have tapered sections which are visibly or palpably thinner due to crushed or parted (incomplete) core strands. Parted core strands no longer provide full strength to the rope, and (if not tightly braided) tend to withdraw from the damage with use, twisting and kinking toward the undamaged ends. Rope that has been abraded or cut on sharp edges should be examined closely by an experienced user, who may choose to cut the rope at that point, rather than risk it parting at that location.

A rope can be cleaned by forming it into a chain sinnet to prevent excessive tangling and washing it in a front-loading clothes washing machine with soap flakes. Strong cleansers, including bleach and detergent should not be used on life-critical nylon components. Commercial rope cleaning devices are also available, but must be used carefully to avoid kinking and weakening the core strands.

== Typical specifications ==
Dynamic ropes
Diameter	Typical impact force^{*}	Typical weight
8.1 mm (~5/16")	6 kN (1350 lb)	42 g/m (0.45 oz/ft)
9.8 mm (~3/8")	8 kN (1800 lb)	63 g/m (0.67 oz/ft)
11 mm (~7/16")	9 kN (2000 lb)	78 g/m (0.84 oz/ft)

^{*}Dynamic ropes are rated for a certain number of falls (usually 5-10) at a given impact force.

Static ropes
Diameter	Typical breaking strength	Typical weight
9 mm (~11/32")	21 kN (4700 lb)	51 g/m (0.55 oz/ft)
10 mm (~3/8")	27 kN (6000 lb)	66 g/m (0.71 oz/ft)
10.5 mm (~13/32")	30 kN (6750 lb)	69 g/m (0.74 oz/ft)
11 mm (~7/16")	34 kN (7650 lb)	75 g/m (0.81 oz/ft)

== See also ==
- Dynamic rope – Rope designed to stretch under load
- Fall factor – Mathematical ratio relevant to climbing safety
- Static rope – Rope designed not to stretch minimally under load
- Rock-climbing equipment – Tools and gear to assist in climbing
- Sailing – Propulsion of a vehicle by wind power
