= Static line (disambiguation) =

Static Line or static line can mean:

- Static line, a fixed cord attached used for low jumps and training in parachuting
- A rope that does not stretch when under load: see dynamic rope
- Static Line (G.I. Joe), a fictional character in the G.I. Joe universe
