= Climbing rope =

Rope used to secure climbers

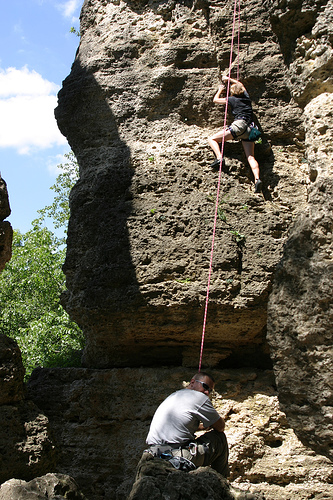
A climber and a belayer using a climbing rope

A climbing rope is a rope that is used in climbing. It is a critical part of an extensive chain of protective equipment (which also includes climbing harnesses, anchors, belay devices, and carabiners) used by climbers to help prevent potentially fatal fall-related accidents.

Climbing ropes must meet very strict requirements so that they do not break in the event of an accidental fall. However, they also need to be light, flexible for knotting, and resistant to chafing over sharp and rough rocks; all that in all possible weather conditions. Although ropes made of natural fibres such as hemp and flax were used in the early days of alpinism, modern climbing uses kernmantle ropes made of a core of nylon or other synthetic material and intertwined in a special way, surrounded by a separate sheath woven over it. The main strength of the rope is in the core, and the sheath of the rope represents only a small fraction of the overall strength of the rope.

Climbing ropes can be classified into two categories according to their elasticity: static and dynamic ropes.

== Static rope ==
A static or semi-static rope is a low-elongation rope that is designed to stretch minimally when placed under load; typically less than 5%. Static ropes have some applications in climbing, such as for hauling gear, abseiling, and top-roping in some situations.

Static ropes can be type A or type B; each with different specifications.

== Dynamic rope ==
Dynamic ropes are used in sport climbing. They are sufficiently stretchable to safely absorb a fall. However, they are relatively weak in static loads and therefore should not be used for zip lines and amusement rides.

A falling climber quickly develops enormous kinetic energy. This energy is released as soon as the climber stops falling. Some of this energy goes to the belay chain, the rest is split between the belayer and the climber. The rigid parts of the belay chain are strong, but only absorb a limited amount of energy. The human body can also only handle a limited amount of force on the body (the so-called catch or impact value) without incurring a back injury. Dynamic ropes therefore are designed to stretch by a limited amount to catch falls. By stretching, a large part of the energy generated is captured so that the final capture impulse for a single rope is less than 12 kN, under testing conditions as defined in the CE standards. UIAA rules mandate that stretching be less than 40%.

Dynamic ropes can be single ropes, half ropes, or twin ropes; each with different specifications.

== Dry rope ==
Dry ropes are ropes that have been treated to repel water. To achieve a UIAA Water Repellent grade, a rope must not absorb more than 5% of the rope's weight. This is in contrast to non-treated ropes which can absorb up to 50% of its weight in water.

The dry treatment prevents dirt and other particulates from getting into the rope, extending the rope life. However, the dry treatment will wear off with extended use. Dry ropes are more expensive than non-treated ropes, so they are typically saved for ice climbing wet weather.

== Maintenance ==
Ropes must be inspected regularly, and retired from use if significantly damaged or worn.
