= Static rope =

Rope designed not to stretch minimally under load

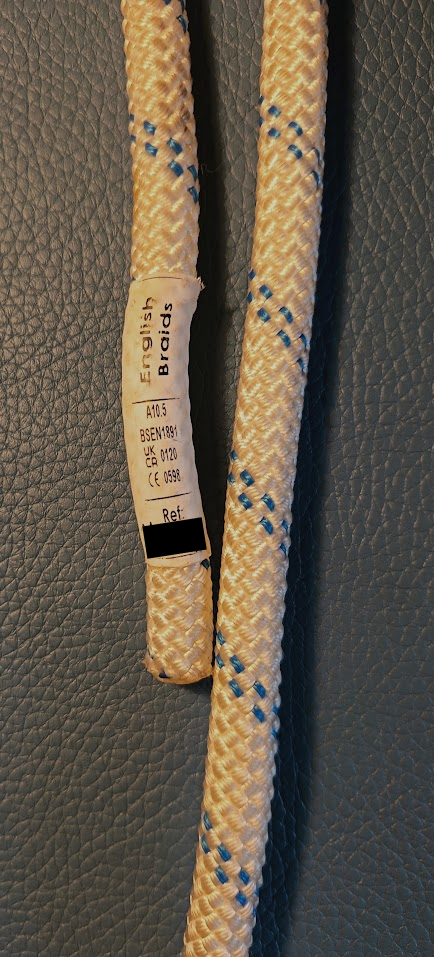
Type A 10.5mm static rope

A static rope, or a semi-static rope is a low-elongation rope that is designed to stretch minimally when placed under load; typically less than 5%. In contrast, a dynamic rope is designed to stretch up to 40%. Static ropes have a wide variety of applications, for instance in climbing, fire rescue operations and caving.

Static ropes have some applications in climbing, such as for hauling gear, abseiling, and top-roping in some situations.

Rated static ropes usually conform to the EN 1891 standard split into EN 1891 Type A, and EN 1891 Type B. Type A ropes are intended for general use due to their superior strength; whereas Type B ropes are intended for use in specialised circumstances where their usually thinner diameter and lower weight are critical for an operation.

== See also ==
- Kernmantle rope
- Dynamic rope
- Climbing rope
