= Rope =

Length of braided strands

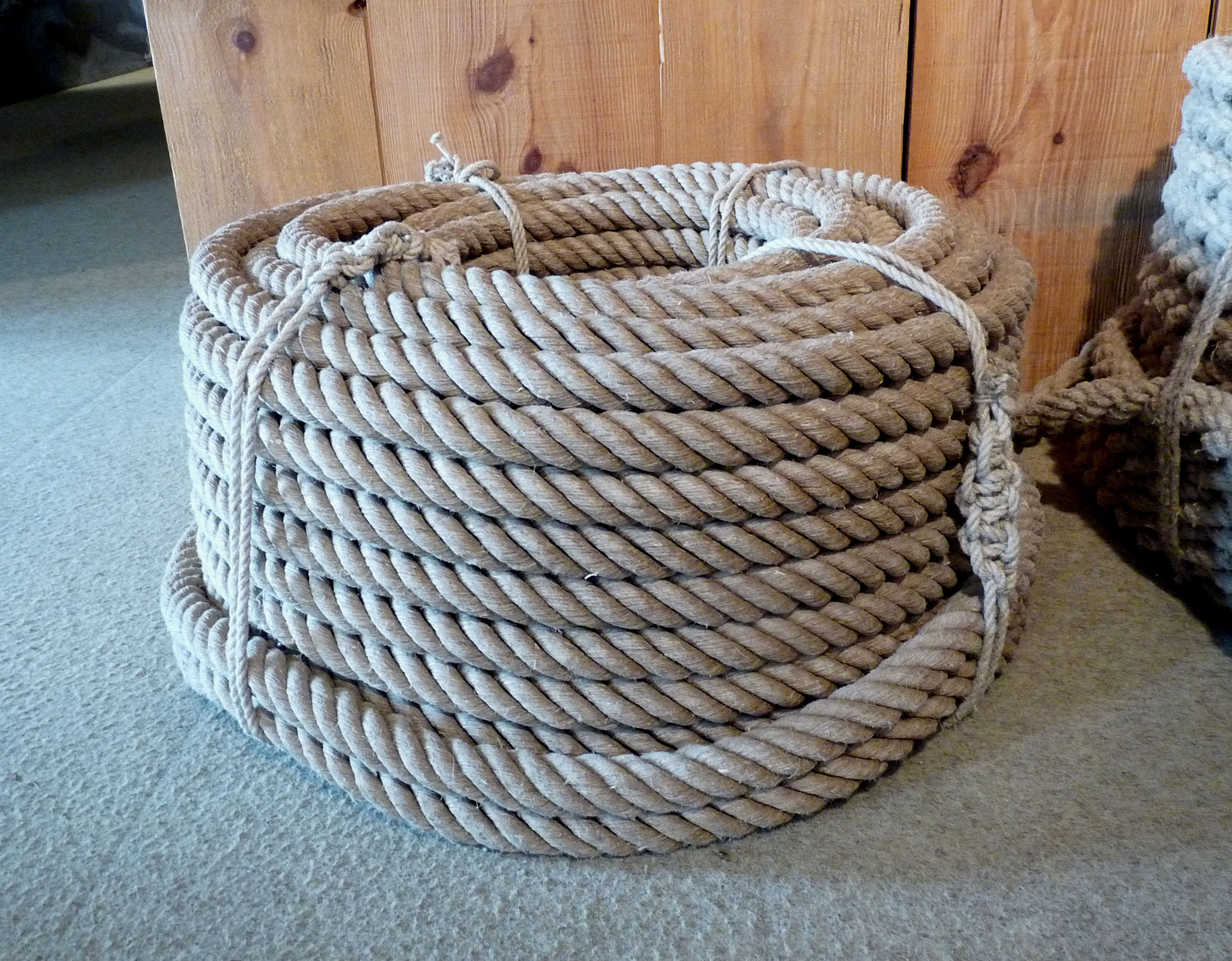
A coil of right-handed laid four-strand rope

A rope is a group of yarns, plies, fibres, or strands that are twisted or braided together into a larger and stronger form. Ropes have high tensile strength and can be used for dragging and lifting. Rope is thicker and stronger than similarly constructed cord, string, and twine.

== Construction ==
Rope may be constructed of any long, fibrous material (e.g., rattan, a natural material), but generally is constructed of certain natural or synthetic fibres. Synthetic fibre ropes are significantly stronger than their natural fibre counterparts, they have a higher tensile strength, they are more resistant to rotting than ropes created from natural fibres, and they can be made to float on water. But synthetic ropes also possess certain disadvantages, including slipperiness, and some can be damaged more easily by UV light.

Common natural fibres for rope are Manila hemp, hemp, linen, cotton, coir, jute, straw, and sisal. Synthetic fibres in use for rope-making include polypropylene, nylon, polyesters (e.g. PET, LCP, Vectran), polyethylene (e.g. Dyneema and Spectra), Aramids (e.g. Twaron, Technora and Kevlar) and acrylics (e.g. Dralon). Some ropes are constructed of mixtures of several fibres or use co-polymer fibres. Wire rope is made of steel or other metal alloys. Ropes have been constructed of other fibrous materials such as silk, wool, and hair, but such ropes are not generally available. Rayon is a regenerated fibre used to make decorative rope. Successive layers are twisted in opposite directions so that the rope resists unlaying when placed under load.

The twist of the strands in a twisted or braided rope serves not only to keep a rope together, but also enables the rope to more evenly distribute tension among the individual strands. Without any twist in the rope, the shortest strand(s) would always be supporting a much higher proportion of the total load.

Construction

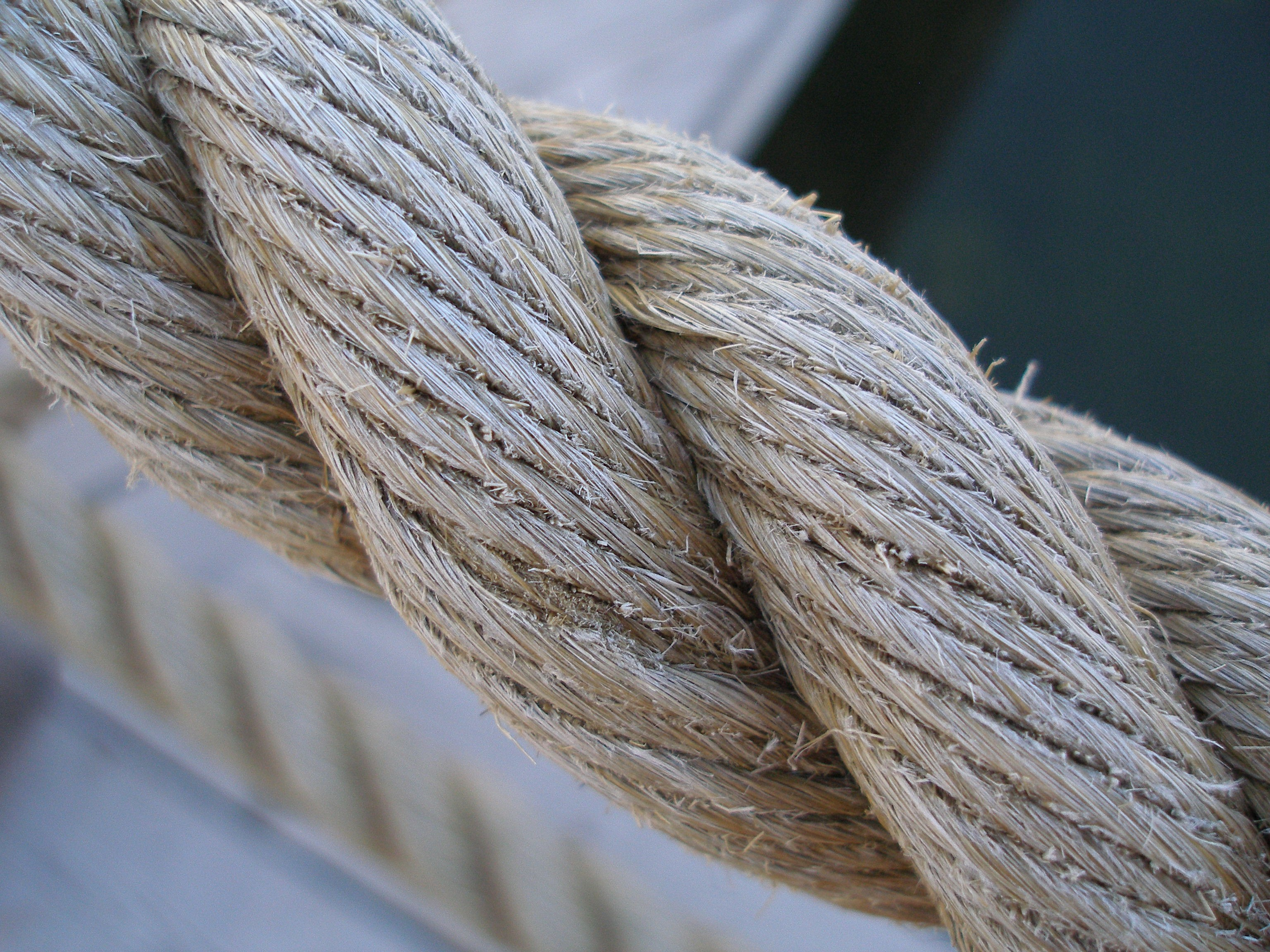
Three-strand natural fibre hawser laid line

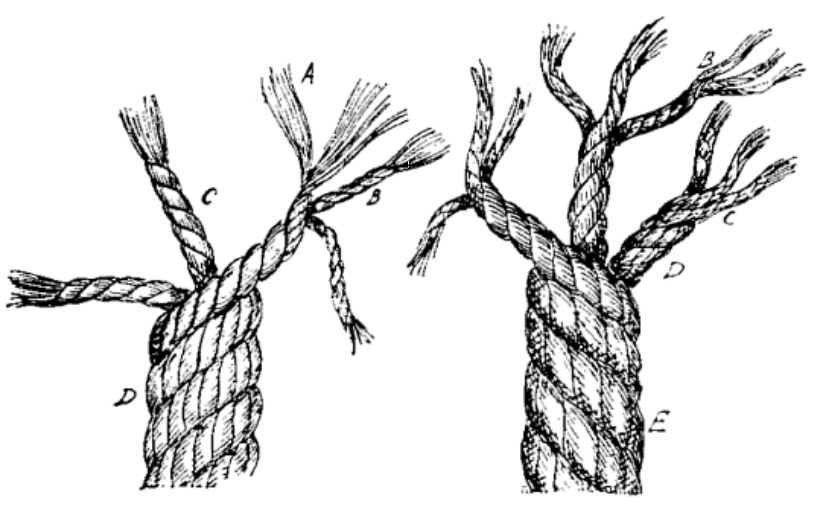
Cable-laid rope (Knots, splices and rope work. Verrill, Alpheus Hyatt, 1919)

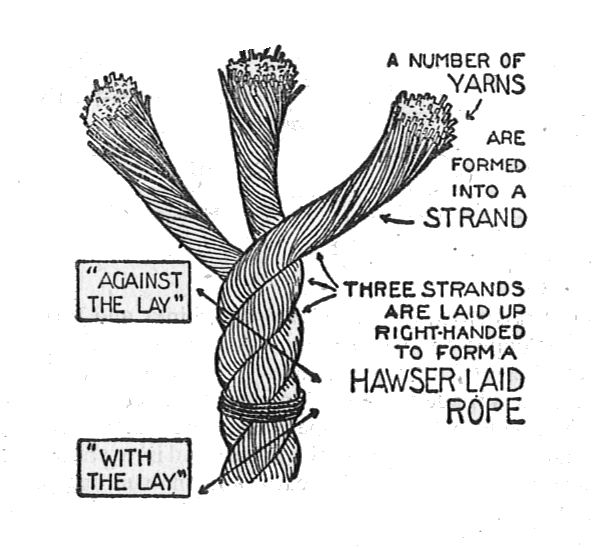
Hawser-laid rope (Seaman's Pocket-Book, 1943)

== Size measurement ==
Because rope has a long history, many systems have been used to specify the size of a rope. In systems that use the inch (Imperial and US customary measurement systems), large ropes over 1 inch (25.4 mm) diameter – such as those used on ships – are measured by their circumference in inches; smaller ropes have a nominal diameter based on the circumference divided by three (as a rough approximation of pi). In the metric system of measurement, the nominal diameter is given in millimetres. The current preferred international standard for rope sizes is to provide the mass per unit length, in kilograms per metre. However, even sources that otherwise use metric units may still give a "rope number" for large ropes, which is the circumference in inches.

== Use ==
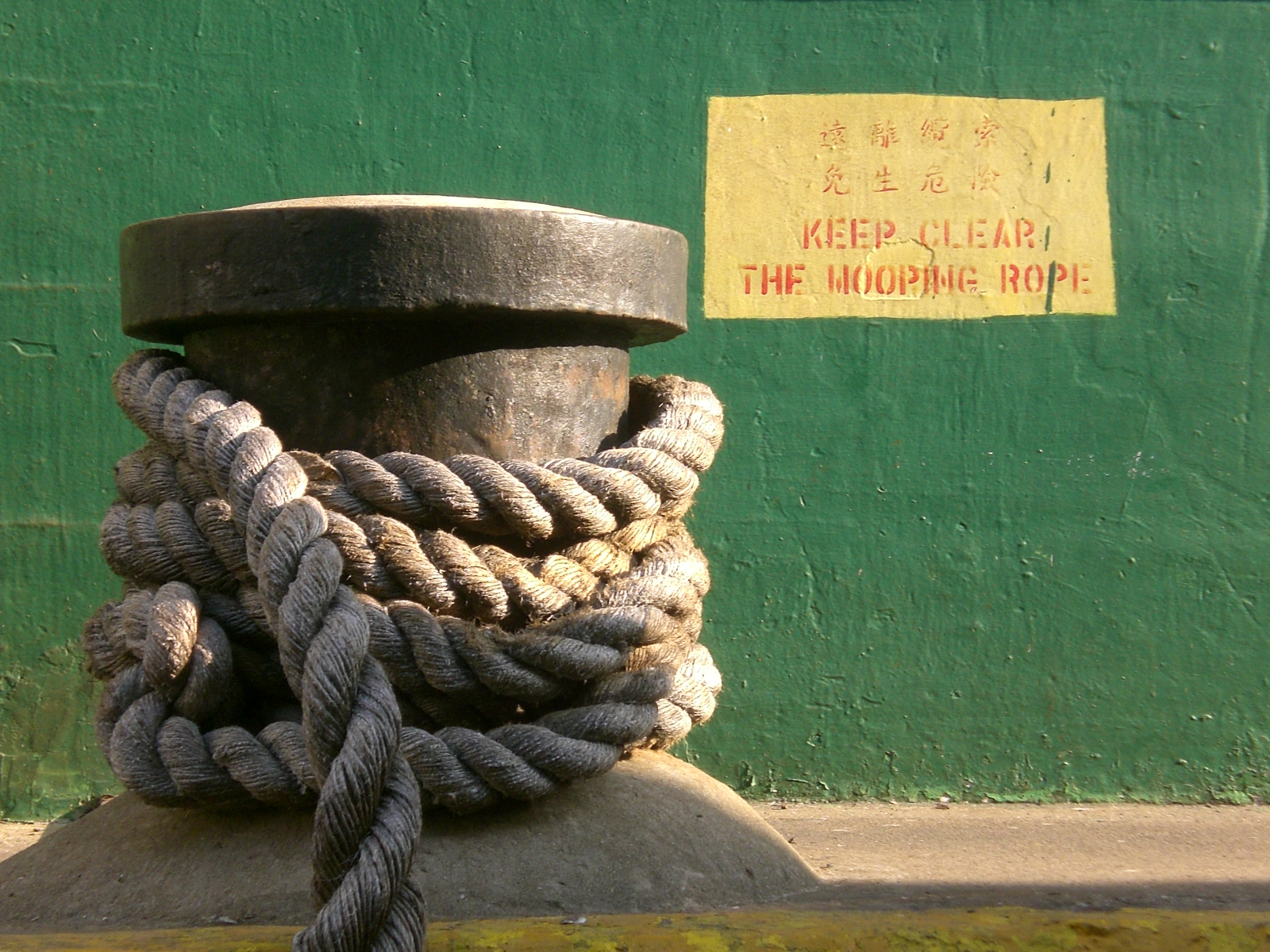
Bollard and mooring line

Rope has been used since prehistoric times. It is of paramount importance in fields as diverse as construction, seafaring, exploration, sports, theatre, and communications. Many types of knots have been developed to fasten with rope, join ropes, and utilize rope to generate mechanical advantage. Pulleys can redirect the pulling force of a rope in another direction, multiply its lifting or pulling power, and distribute a load over multiple parts of the same rope to increase safety and decrease wear.

Winches and capstans are machines designed to pull ropes.

Knotted ropes have historically been used for measuring and performing mathematical calculations. For example, Ancient Egyptian rope stretchers used knotted ropes to measure distances, medieval European shipbuilders and architects performed calculations using arithmetic ropes, and some pre-colonial South American cultures used quipu for numerical record-keeping.

== History ==
The use of ropes for hunting, pulling, fastening, attaching, carrying, lifting, and climbing dates back to prehistoric times. It is likely that the earliest "ropes" were naturally occurring lengths of plant fibre, such as vines, followed soon by the first attempts at twisting and braiding these strands together to form the first proper ropes in the modern sense of the word. The earliest evidence of a suspected rope is a very small fragment of three-ply cord from a Neanderthal site, dated to approximately 50,000 years ago. This item was so small, it was only discovered and described with the help of a high-power microscope. It is slightly thicker than the average thumbnail and would not stretch from edge to edge across a little fingernail. There are other ways fibres can twist in nature, without deliberate construction.

A tool dated between 35,000 and 40,000 years old found in the Hohle Fels cave in south-western Germany has been identified as a means for making rope. It is a 20 cm (8 in) strip of mammoth ivory with four holes drilled through it. Each hole is lined with precisely cut spiral incisions. The grooves on three of the holes spiral in a clockwise direction from each side of the strip. The grooves on one hole spiral clockwise on one side, but counterclockwise on the other side. Plant fibres have been found on it that could have come from when they fed through the holes and the tool twisted, creating a single ply yarn. Fiber-making experiments with a replica found that the perforations served as effective guides for raw fibers, making it easier to create a strong, elastic rope than simply twisting fibers by hand; spiral incisions would have tended to keep the fibres in place. But the incisions cannot impart any twist to the fibres pulled through the holes. Other 15,000-year-old objects with holes with spiral incisions, made from reindeer antler, found across Europe are thought to have been used to manipulate ropes, or perhaps some other purpose. They were originally named "batons", and thought possibly to have been carried as badges of rank.

Impressions of cordage found on fired clay provide evidence of string and ropemaking technology in Pavlov I, Moravia, dating back between 24,000 and 26,000 years. Fossilized fragments of "probably two-ply laid rope of about 7 mm [0.28 in] diameter" were found in one of the caves at Lascaux, dating to approximately 15,000 BC.

The ancient Egyptians were probably the first civilization to develop special tools to make rope. Egyptian rope dates back to 4000 to 3500 BC and was generally made of water reed fibres. Other rope in antiquity was made from the fibres of date palms, flax, grass, papyrus, leather, or animal hair. The use of such ropes, pulled by thousands of workers, enabled the Egyptians to move the heavy stones necessary for building their monuments. Starting from approximately 2800 BC, rope made of hemp fibres was in use in China. Rope and the craft of rope making spread throughout Asia, India, and Europe over the next several thousand years.

From the Middle Ages until the 18th century, in Europe ropes were constructed in ropewalks, very long buildings where strands the full length of the rope were spread out and then laid up or twisted together to form the rope. The cable length was thus set by the length of the available rope walk. This is related to the unit of length termed cable length. This allowed for long ropes of up to 300 yards (270 m) long or longer to be made. These long ropes were necessary in shipping as short ropes would require splicing to make them long enough to use for sheets and halyards. The strongest form of splicing is the short splice, which doubles the cross-sectional area of the rope at the area of the splice, which would cause problems in running the line through pulleys. Any splices narrow enough to maintain smooth running would be less able to support the required weight. Rope intended for naval use would have a coloured yarn, known as the "rogue's yarn", included in the layup. This enabled the source to be identified and to detect pilfering.

Leonardo da Vinci drew sketches of a concept for a ropemaking machine, but it was never built. Remarkable feats of construction were accomplished using rope but without advanced technology: In 1586, Domenico Fontana erected the 327-ton obelisk on Rome's Saint Peter's Square with a concerted effort of 900 men, 75 horses, and countless pulleys and meters of rope. By the late 18th century, several working machines had been built and patented.

Some rope is still made from natural fibres, such as coir and sisal, despite the dominance of synthetic fibres such as nylon and polypropylene, which have become increasingly popular since the 1950s.

Nylon was discovered in the late 1930s and was first introduced into fiber ropes during World War II. Indeed, the first synthetic fiber ropes were small braided parachute cords and three-strand tow ropes for gliders, made of nylon during World War II.

=== Gallery ===
History

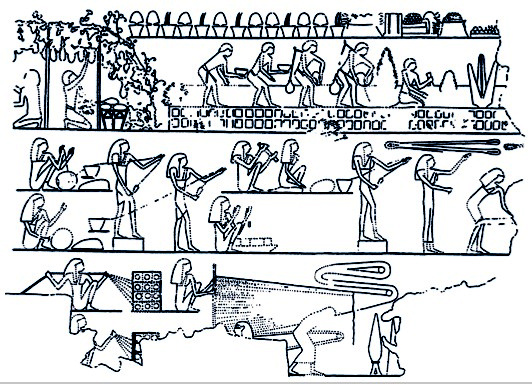
Ancient Egyptians were the first to document tools for ropemaking

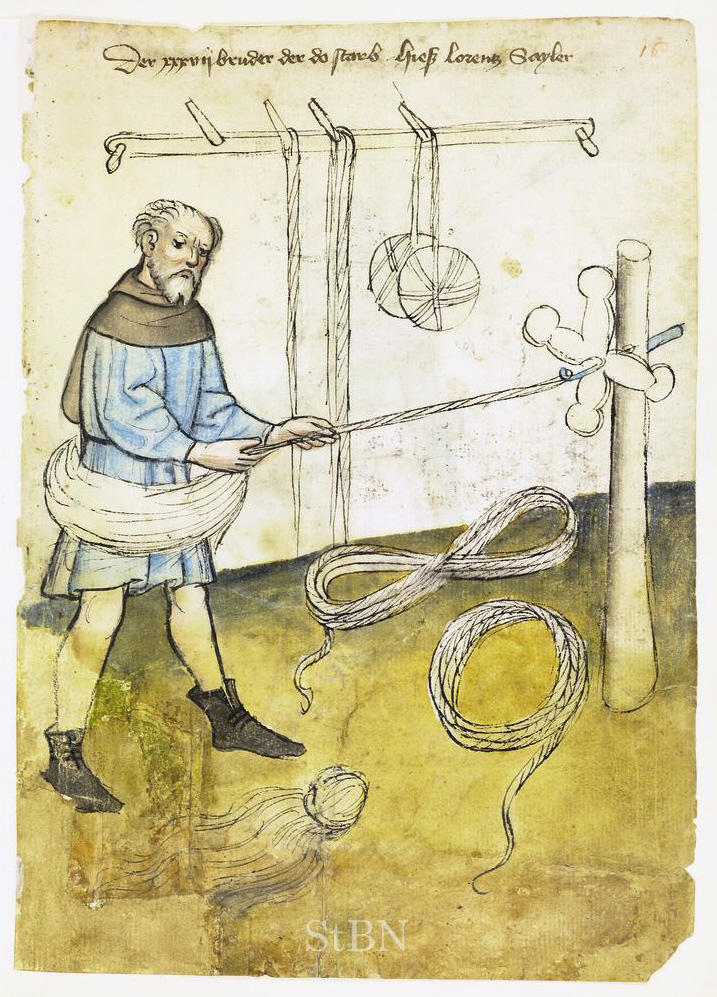
A ropemaker at work, c. 1425

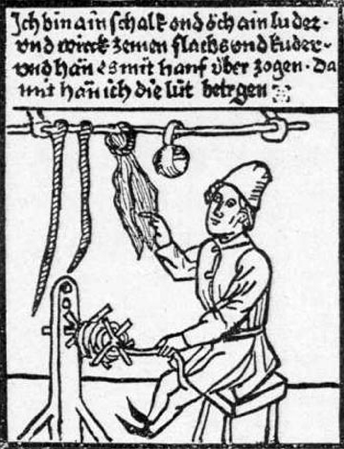
A German ropemaker, c. 1470

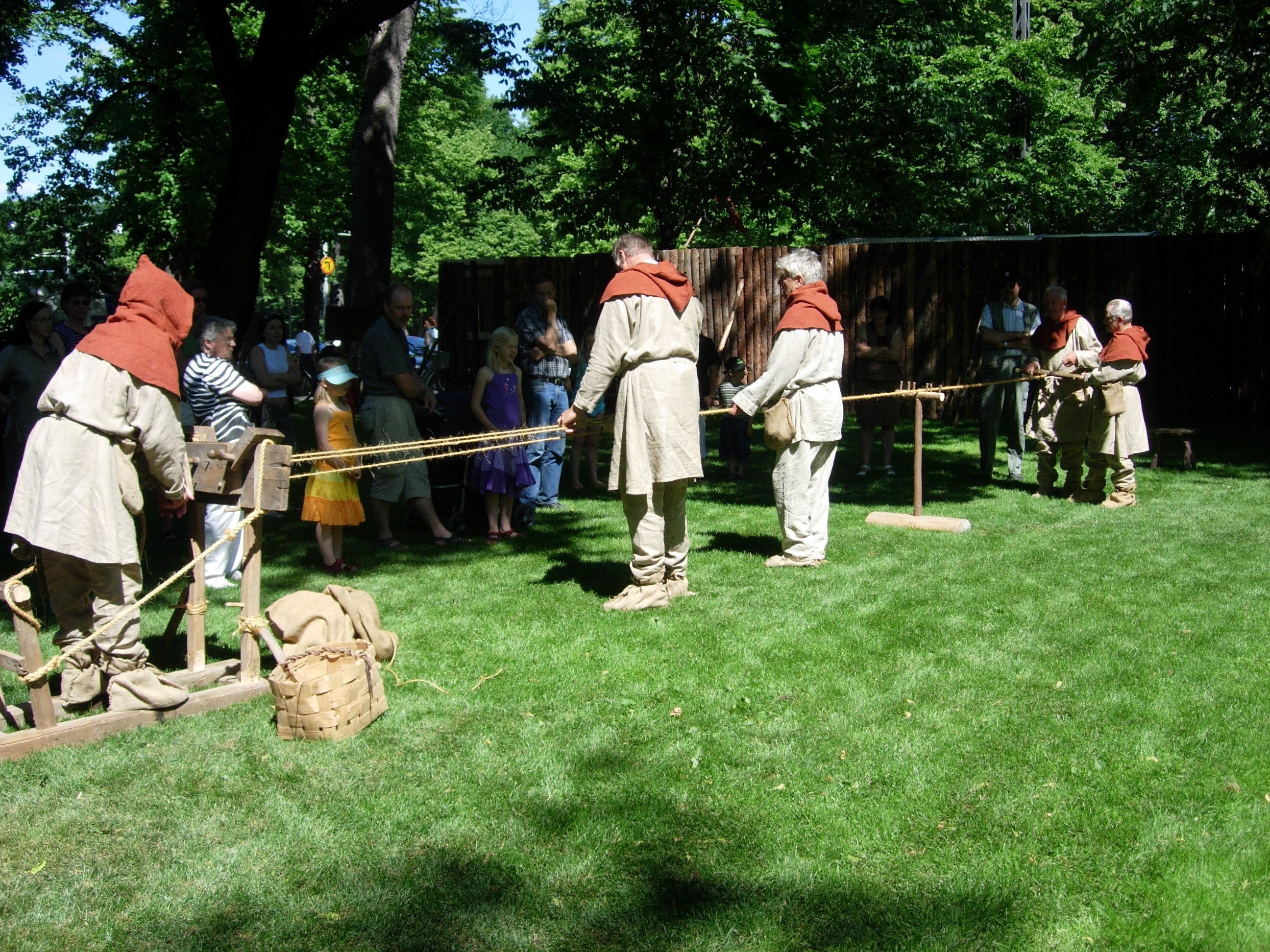
Public demonstration of historical ropemaking technique

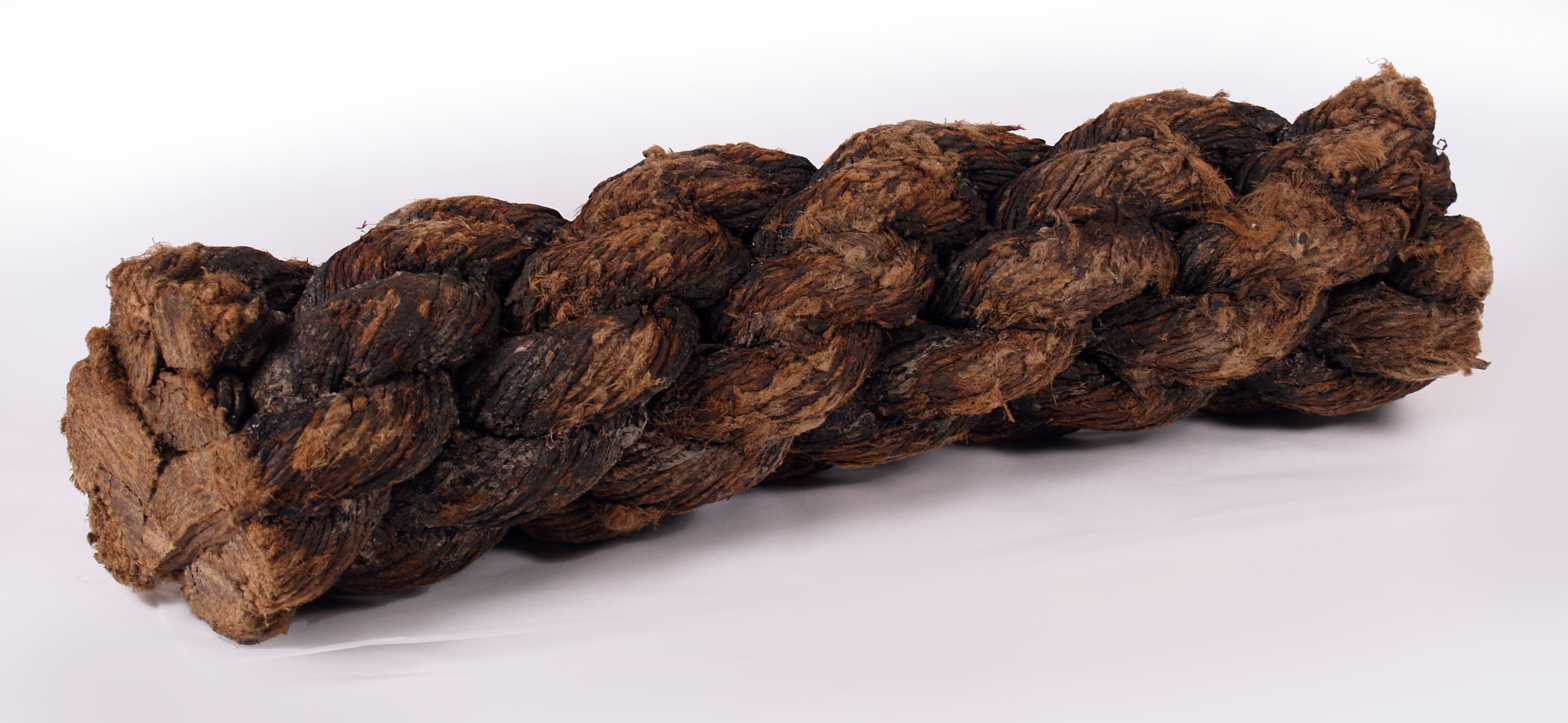
A piece of preserved rope found on board the 16th century carrack Mary Rose

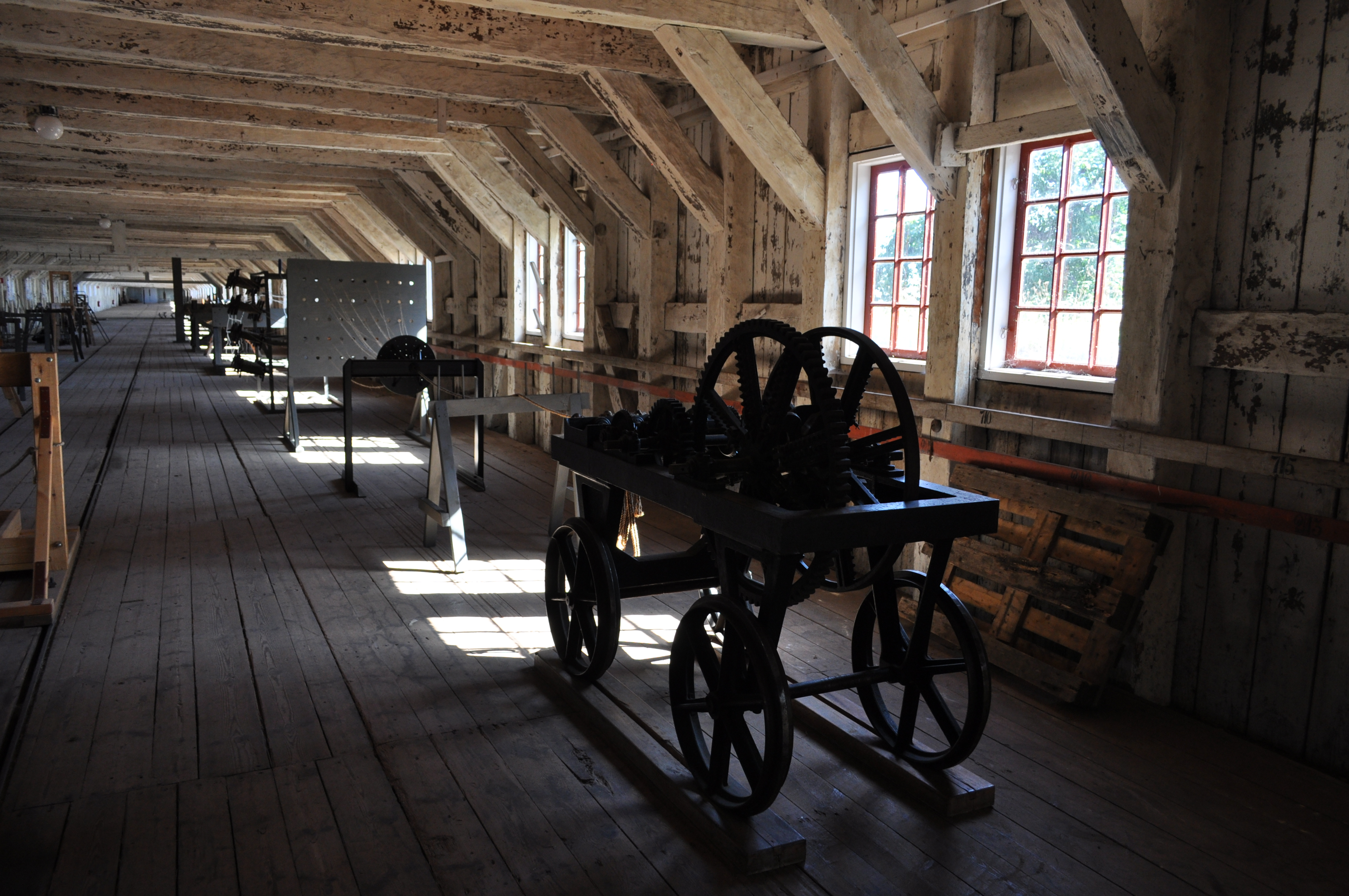
A ropewalk in Karlskrona, Sweden

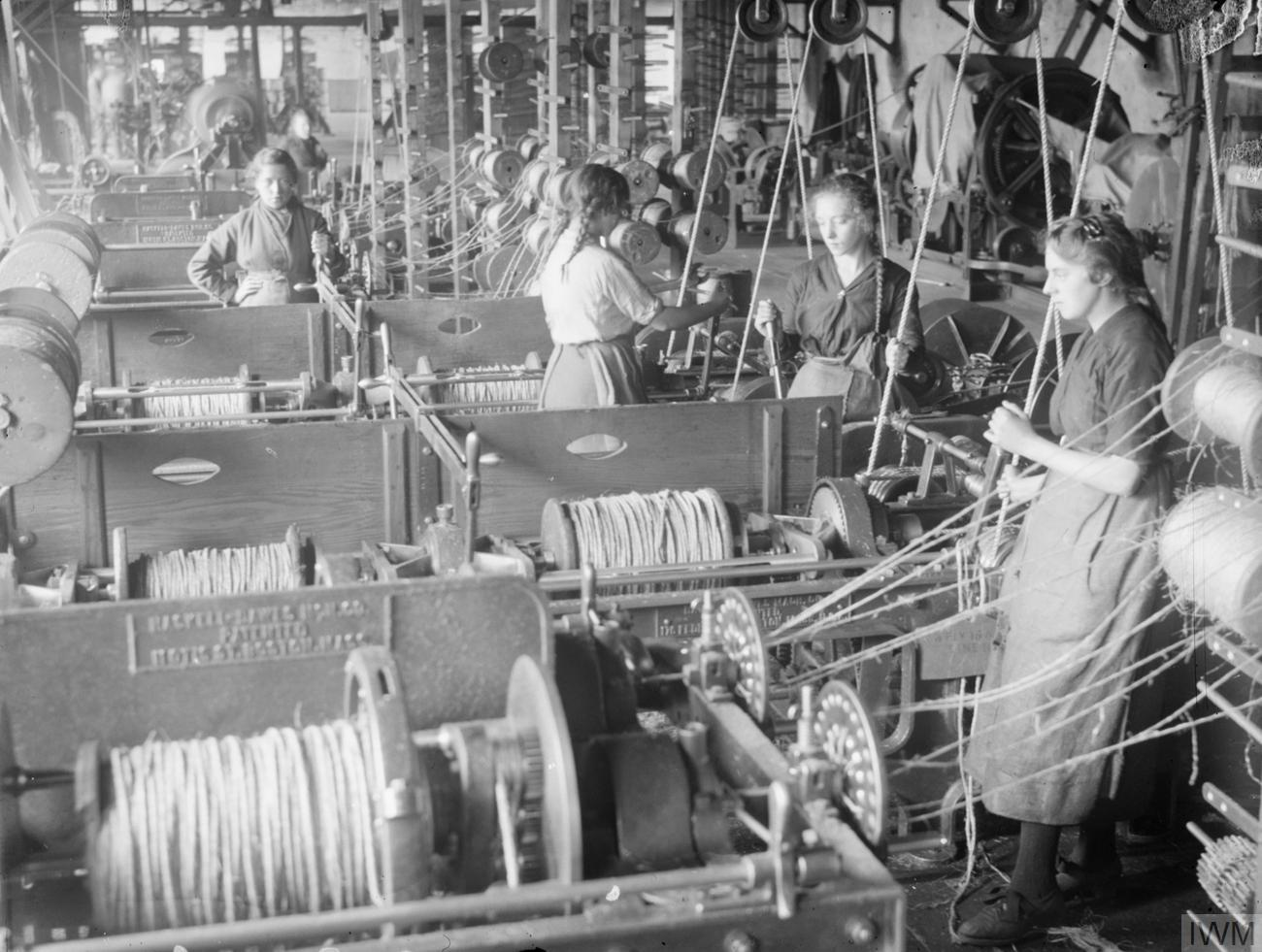
Rope laying machines in a Scottish rope factory, November 1918

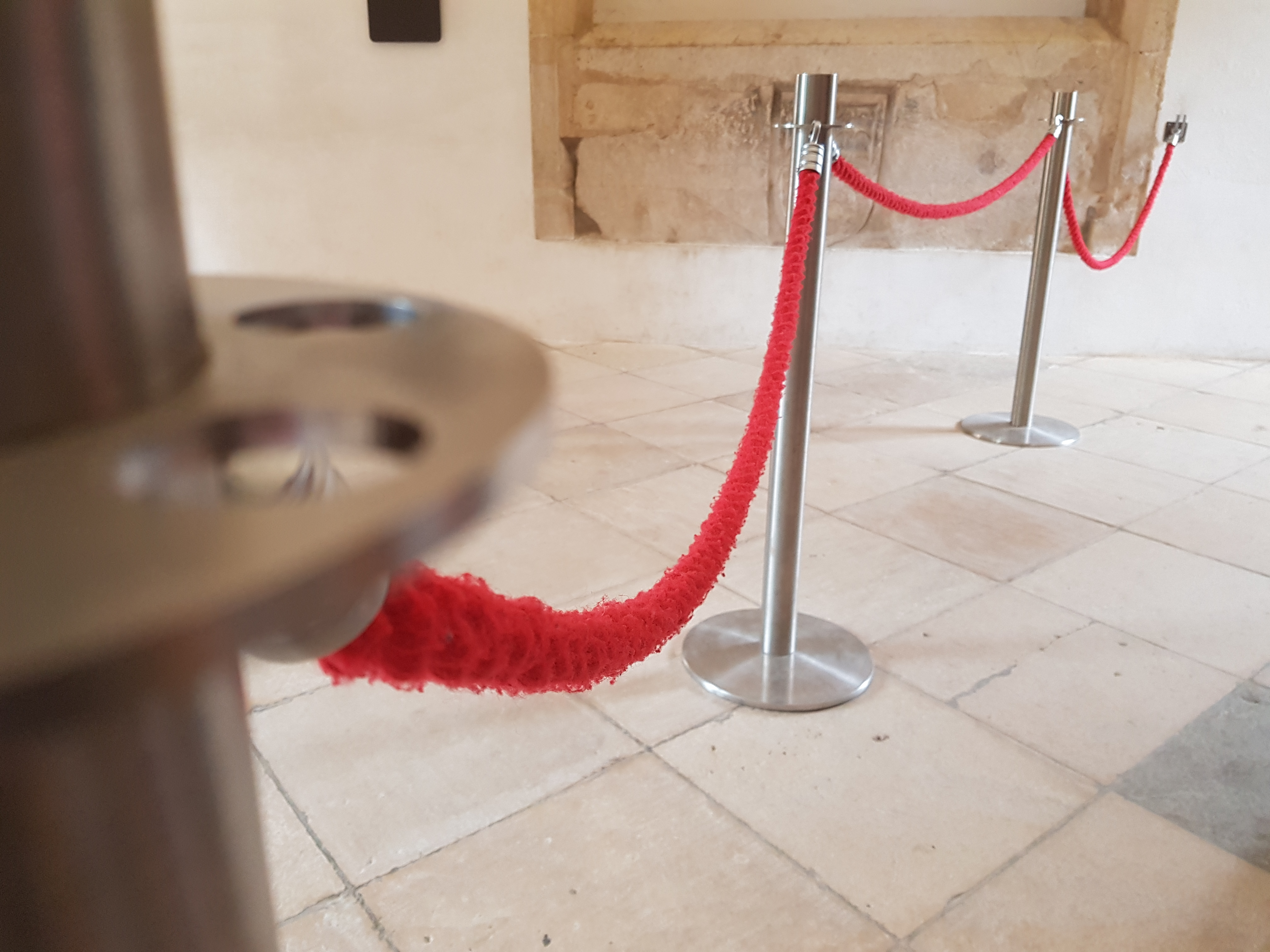
Stanchions and velvet rope

== Styles ==
=== Laid or twisted ===
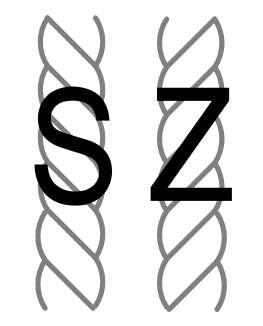
Illustration of the S and Z naming convention

Laid rope, also called twisted rope, is historically the prevalent form of rope, at least in modern Western history. Standard twisted rope generally consists of three strands and is usually right-laid, or given a final right-handed twist. The ISO 2 standard uses the uppercase letters S and Z to indicate the two possible directions of twist, as suggested by the direction of slant of the central portions of these two letters. The handedness of the twist is the direction of the twists as they progress away from an observer. Thus, the Z-twist rope is said to be right-handed, and the S-twist to be left-handed.

Twisted ropes are built up in three steps. First, fibres are gathered and spun into yarns. A number of these yarns are then formed into strands by twisting. The strands are then twisted together to lay the rope. The twist of the yarn is opposite to that of the strand, and that in turn is opposite to that of the rope. It is this counter-twist, introduced with each successive operation, which holds the final rope together as a stable, unified object.

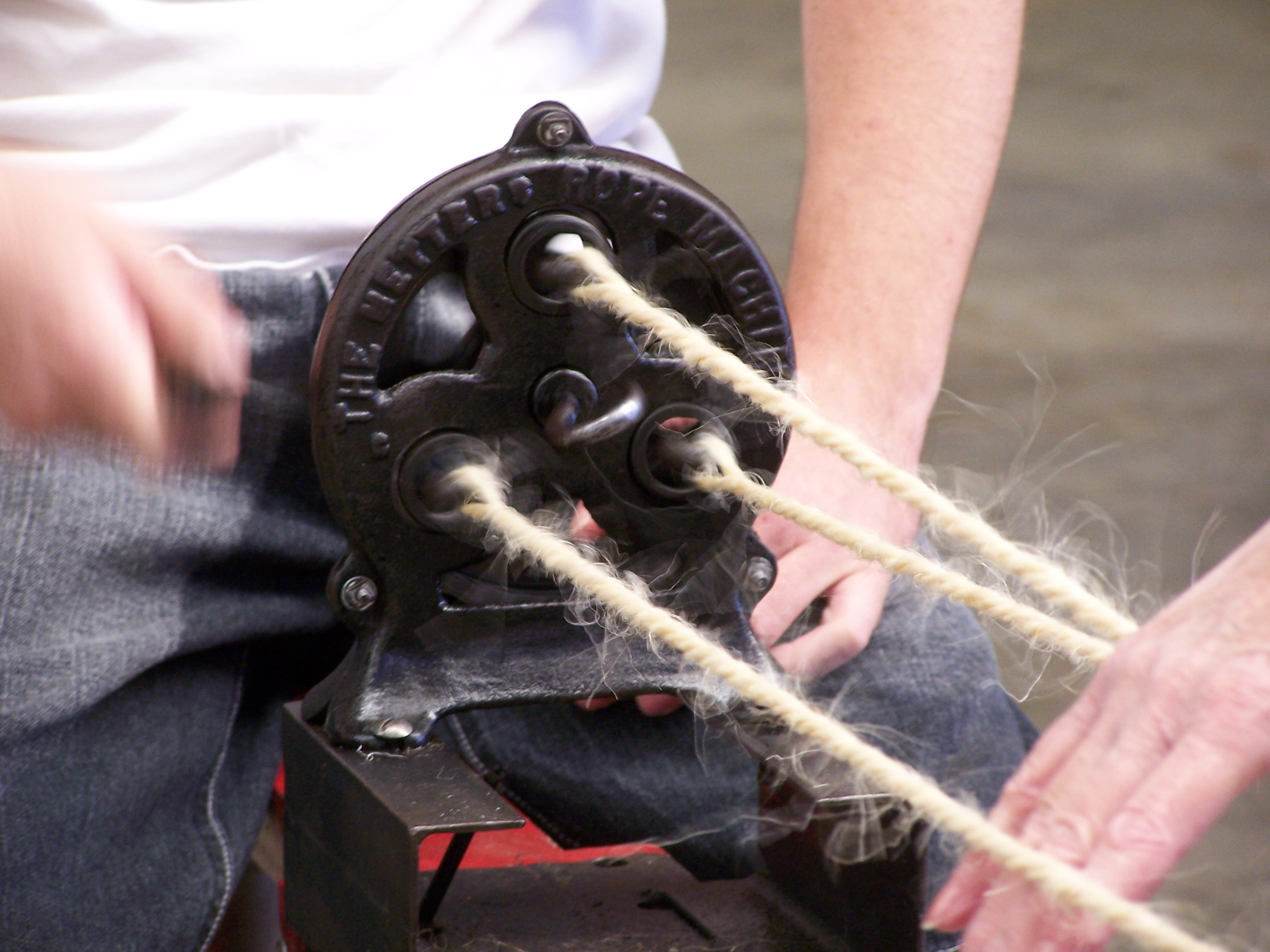
Rope making using the twisted rope method on a 1928 Metters Rope Making Machine

Traditionally, a three strand laid rope is called a plain- or hawser-laid, a four strand rope is called shroud-laid, and a larger rope formed by counter-twisting three or more multi-strand ropes together is called cable-laid. Cable-laid rope is sometimes clamped to maintain a tight counter-twist rendering the resulting cable virtually waterproof. Without this feature, deep water sailing (before the advent of steel chains and other lines) was essentially impossible, as any appreciable length of rope for anchoring or ship-to-ship transfers would become too waterlogged – and therefore too heavy – to lift, even with the aid of a capstan or windlass.

One property of laid rope is that it partially untwists when used. This can cause spinning of suspended loads, or stretching, kinking, or hockling of the rope itself. An additional drawback of twisted construction is that every fibre is exposed to abrasion numerous times along the length of the rope. This means that the rope can degrade to numerous inch-long fibre fragments, which are not easily detected visually.

Twisted ropes have a preferred direction for coiling. Regular right-laid rope should be coiled clockwise to prevent kinking. Coiling this way imparts a twist to the rope. Rope of this type must be bound at its ends by some means to prevent untwisting.

=== Braided ===
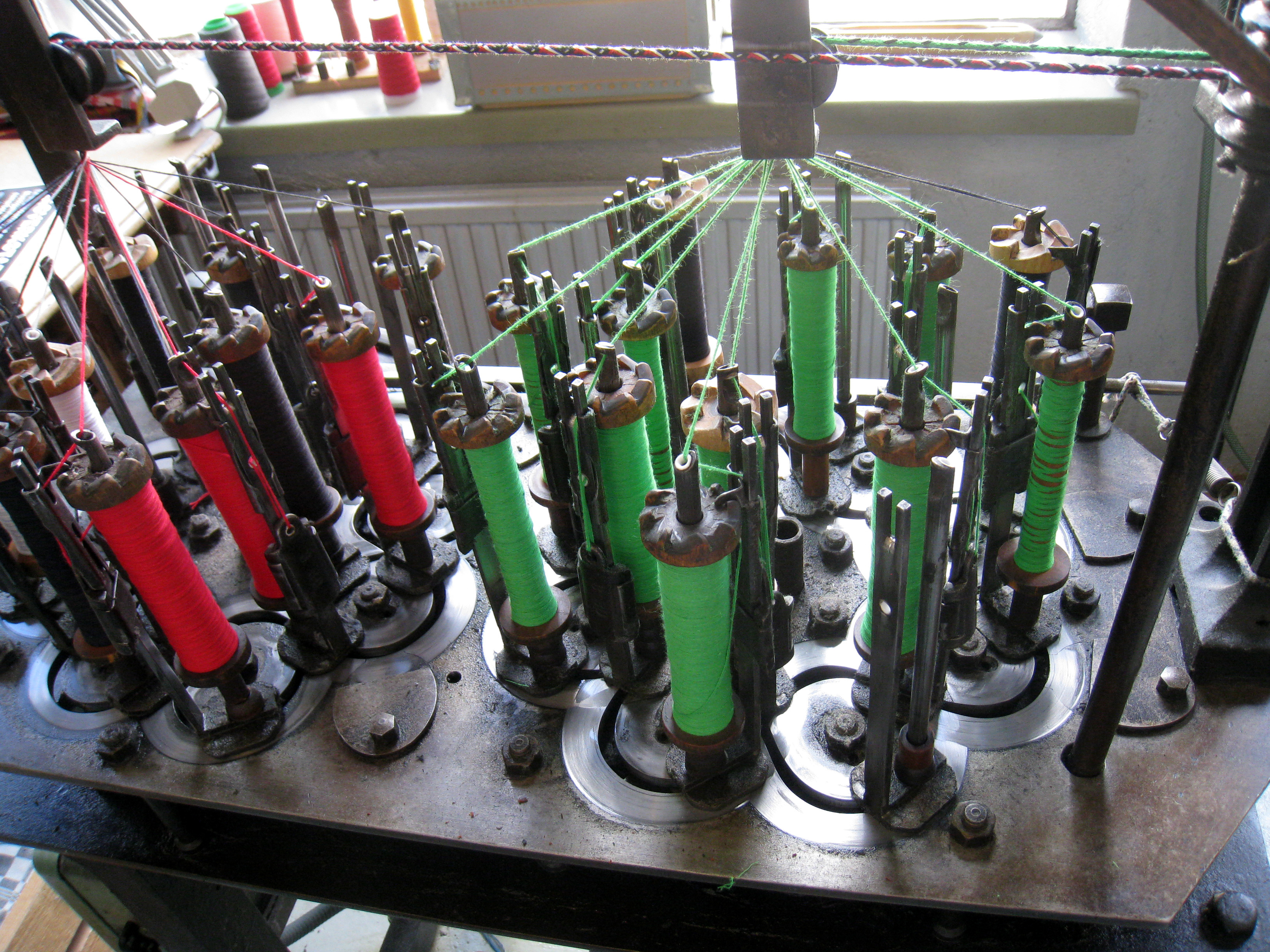
A rope braiding machine at the Arbetets Museum (Museum of Work) in Norrköping, Sweden

While rope may be made from three or more strands, modern braided rope consists of a braided, tubular jacket over strands of fibre, which may also be braided. Some forms of braided rope with untwisted cores have a particular advantage in that they do not impart an additional twisting force when they are stressed. The lack of added twisting forces is an advantage when a load is freely suspended, as when a rope is used for rappelling or to suspend an arborist. Other specialized cores reduce the shock from arresting a fall when used as part of a personal or group safety system.

Braided ropes are generally made from nylon, polyester, polypropylene or high performance fibres such as high modulus polyethylene (HMPE) and aramid. Nylon is chosen for its strength and elastic properties. However, nylon absorbs water and is 10–15% weaker when wet. Polyester is approximately 90% as strong as nylon, but it stretches less under load and is not affected by water. It has somewhat better UV resistance and is more abrasion-resistant. Polypropylene is preferred for low cost and light weight (it floats on water), but it has limited resistance to ultraviolet light, friction, and heat.

Braided ropes (and objects like garden hoses, fibre optic or coaxial cables, etc.) that have no lay or inherent twist uncoil better if each alternate loop is twisted in the opposite direction, such as in figure-eight coils, where the twist reverses regularly and thus cancels out.

A single braid consists of an even number of strands, typically eight or twelve, braided into a circular pattern with half of the strands going clockwise and the other half going anticlockwise. The strands can interlock with either twill or panama (Basked) or seldom plain weave. Kyosev introduced the German notation in English. In this notation, the braiding process is described by the floating length (German: Flechtigkeit) and the number of yarns in a group (German: Fädigkeit), rather than by the weaving-pattern names. The central void may be large or small; if large, the braid may be called hollow.

Double braid, also called braid-on-braid, consists of an inner braid filling the central void in an outer braid, which may be of the same or different material. Often, the inner braid fibre is selected for its strength, while the outer braid fibre is chosen for its resistance to abrasion.

In a solid braid (square braid, gasket, or form braid), there are at least three or more groups of yarns in a complex, interlocking structure. This construction is popular for gaskets and general-purpose utility rope, but rare in specialized high-performance line.

Kernmantle rope has a core (kern) of long twisted fibres in the center, with a braided outer sheath or mantle of woven fibres. The kern provides most of the strength (about 70%), while the mantle protects the kern and determines the handling properties of the rope (how easy it is to hold, to tie knots in, and so on). In dynamic climbing line, the core fibres are usually twisted to make the rope more elastic. Static kernmantle ropes are made with untwisted core fibres and a tighter braid, which makes them stiffer while limiting their elasticity.

=== Other types ===
Plaited rope is made by braiding twisted strands, and is also called square braid. It is not as round as twisted rope and coarser to the touch. It is less prone to kinking than twisted rope and, depending on the material, very flexible, making it easy to handle and knot. This construction also exposes all fibres, with the same drawbacks as described above. Brait rope is a combination of braided and plaited, a non-rotating alternative to laid three-strand ropes. Due to its excellent energy-absorption characteristics, it is often used by arborists. It is also a popular rope for anchoring and can be used as a mooring warp. Yale Cordage pioneered this type of construction.

An endless winding rope is made by winding single strands of high-performance yarns around two end terminations until the desired break strength or stiffness has been reached. This type of rope (often specified as cable to distinguish it from braided or twined constructions) has the advantage of having no construction stretch, unlike the above constructions. SmartRigging and FibreMax pioneered endless winding.

=== Rock climbing ===
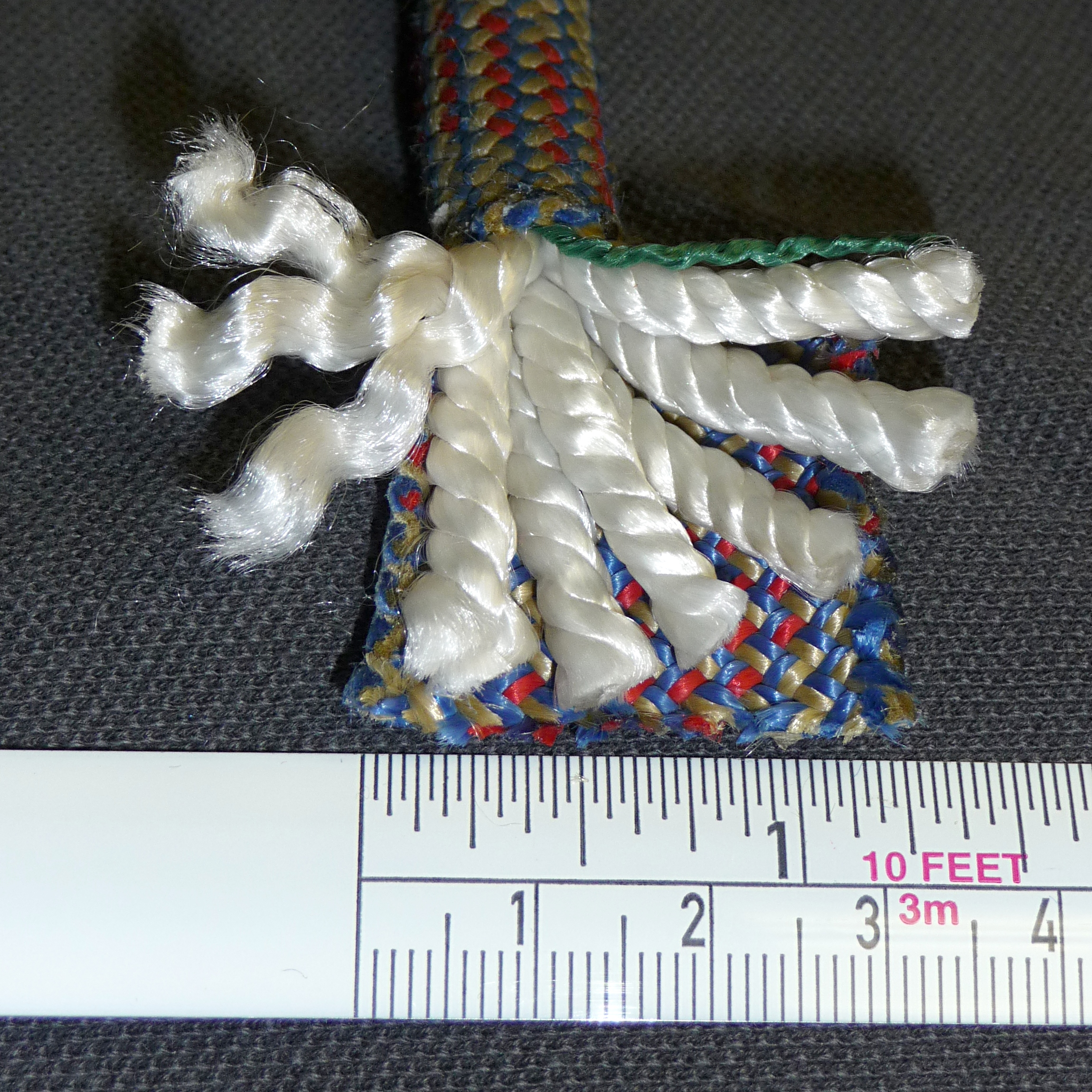
Dynamic kernmantle rock climbing rope with its braided sheath cut to expose the twisted core yarns and core yarn plies

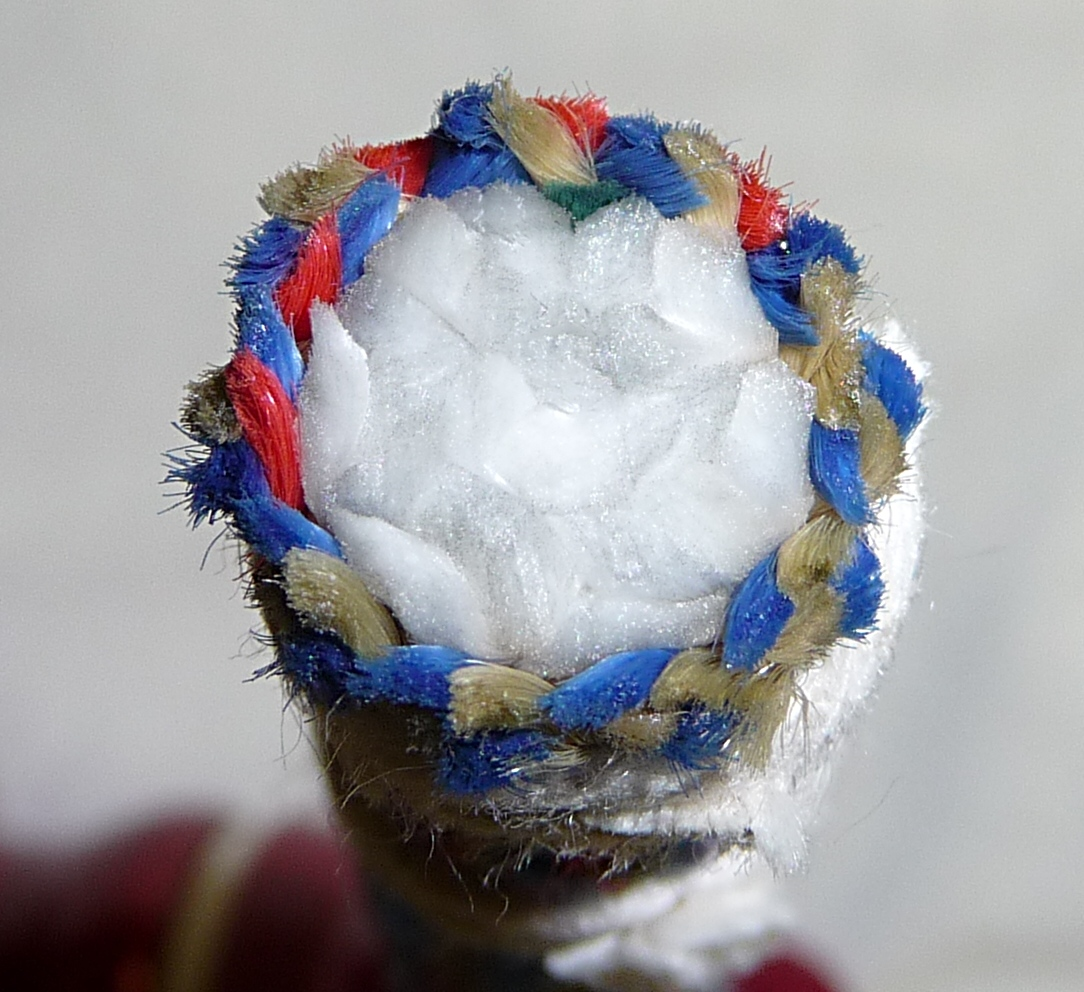
Section through kernmantle rope

The sport of rock climbing uses what is termed "dynamic" rope, an elastic rope which stretches under load to absorb the energy generated in arresting a fall without creating forces high enough to injure the climber. Such ropes are of kernmantle construction, as described below.

Conversely, "static" ropes have minimal stretch and are not designed to arrest free falls. They are used in caving, rappelling, rescue operations, and various industries, including window washing.

The UIAA, in concert with the CEN, sets climbing-rope standards and oversees testing. Any rope bearing a GUIANA or CE certification tag is suitable for climbing. Climbing ropes cut easily when under load. Keeping them away from sharp rock edges is imperative. Previous falls arrested by a rope, damage to its sheath, and contamination by dirt or solvents all weaken a rope and can render it unsuitable for further sports use.

Rock climbing ropes are designated for single, double, or twin use. A single rope is the most common and is intended to be used by itself. These range in thickness from roughly 9 to 11 mm (0.35 to 0.43 in). Smaller-diameter ropes are lighter, but wear out faster.

Double ropes are thinner than single, usually 9 mm (0.35 in) and under, and are intended for use in pairs. These offer a greater margin of safety against cutting, since it is unlikely that both ropes will be cut, but complicate both belaying and leading. Double ropes may be clipped into alternating pieces of protection, allowing each to stay straighter and reduce both individual and total rope drag.

Twin ropes are thin ropes that must be clipped into the same piece of protection, in effect being treated as a single strand. This adds security in situations where a rope may get cut. However, new, lighter-weight ropes with greater safety have virtually replaced this type of rope.

The butterfly and alpine coils are methods of coiling a rope for carrying.

== Gallery of μCT/micro-CT images and animations ==
=== 2D images / sections ===
Sections

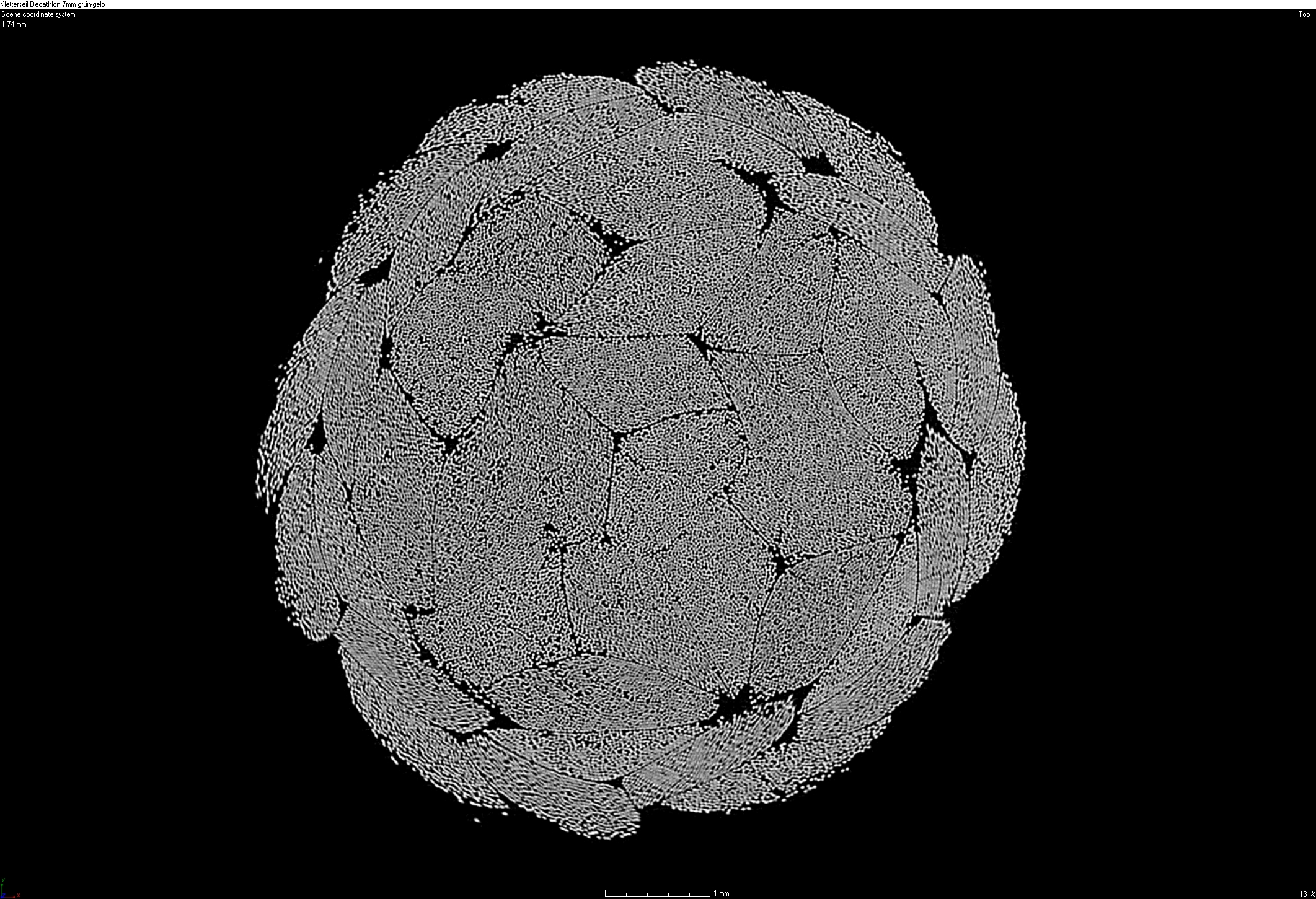

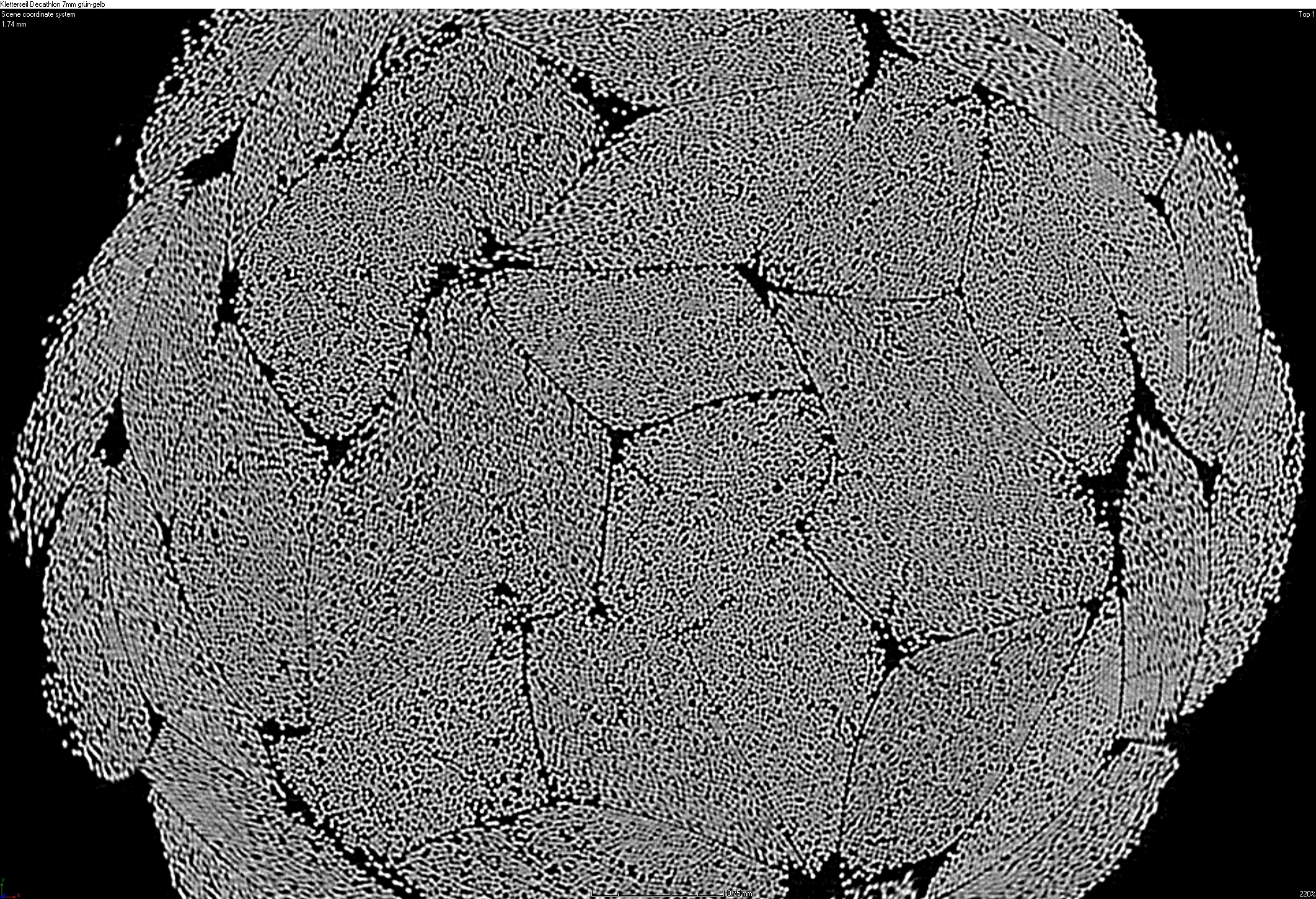

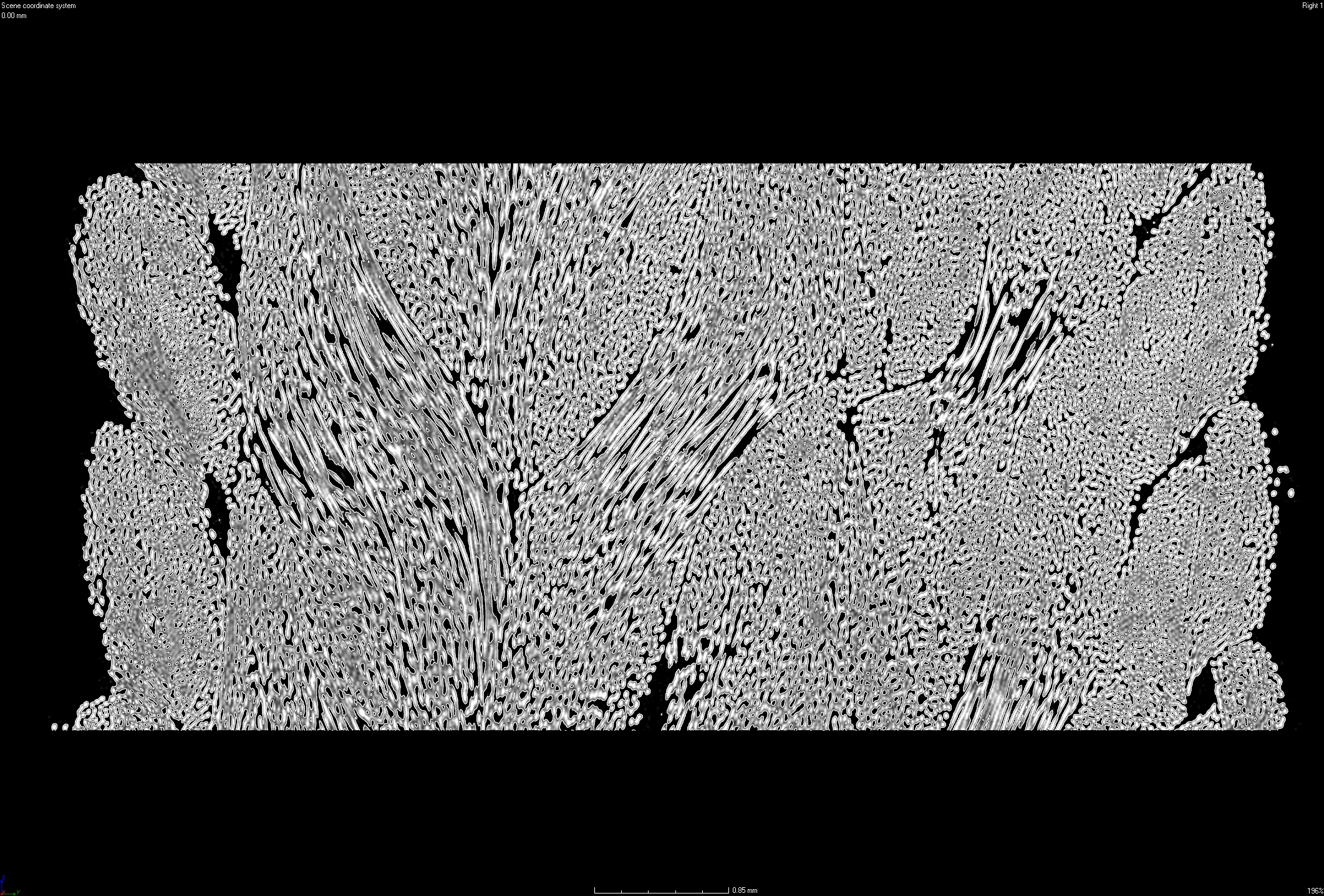

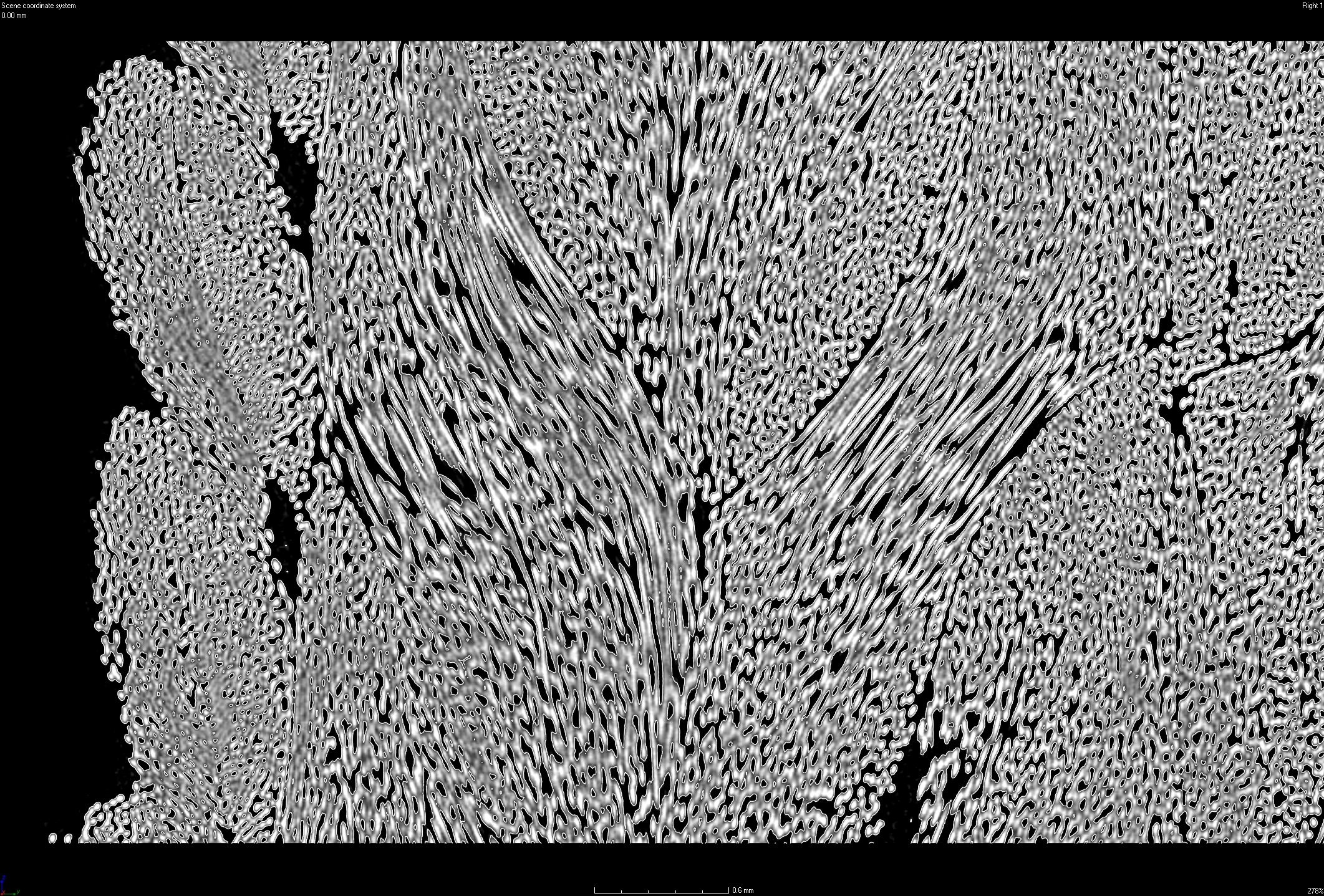

=== 2D flight-throughs/sections ===
Sections

=== 3D renderings ===
Sections

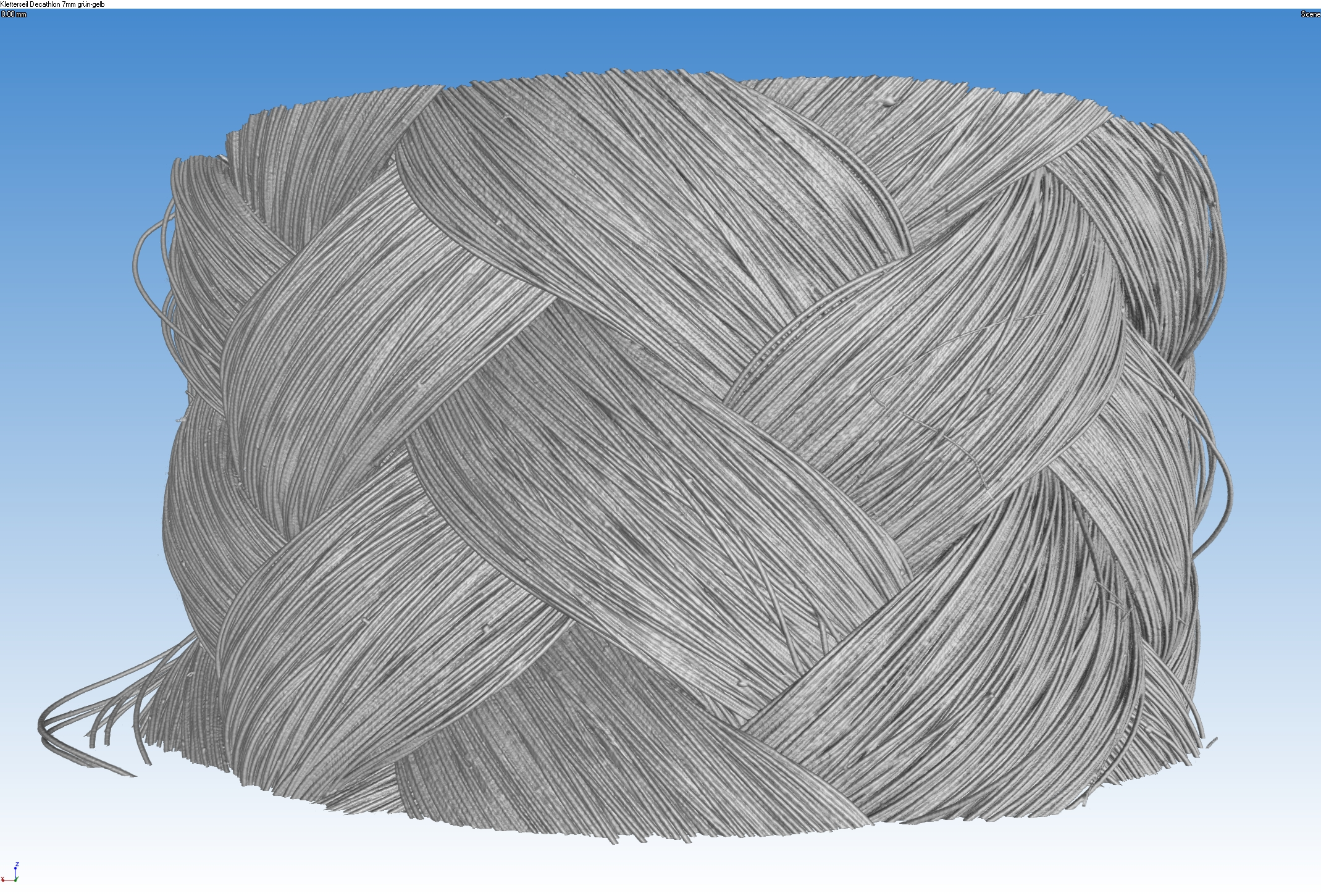

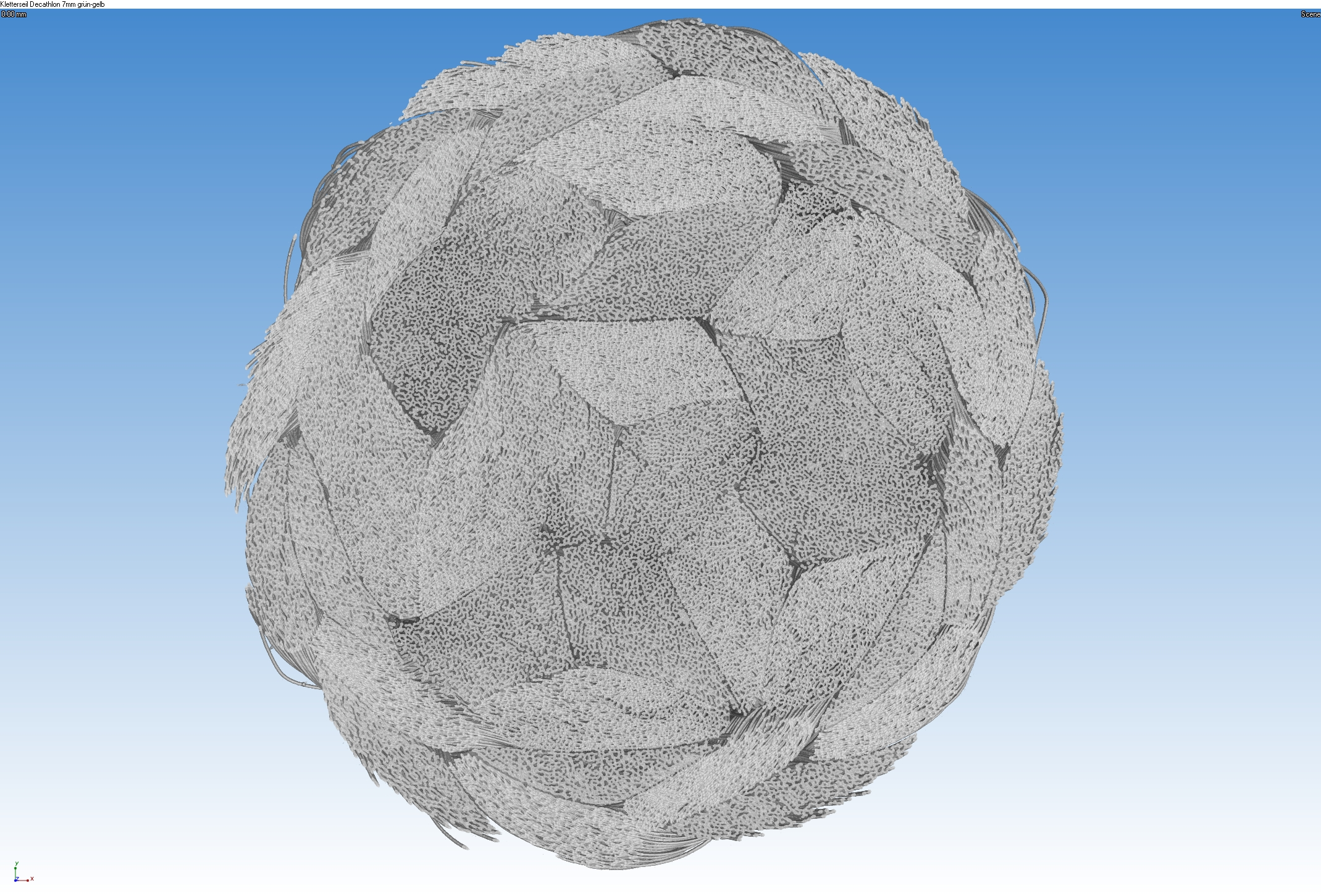

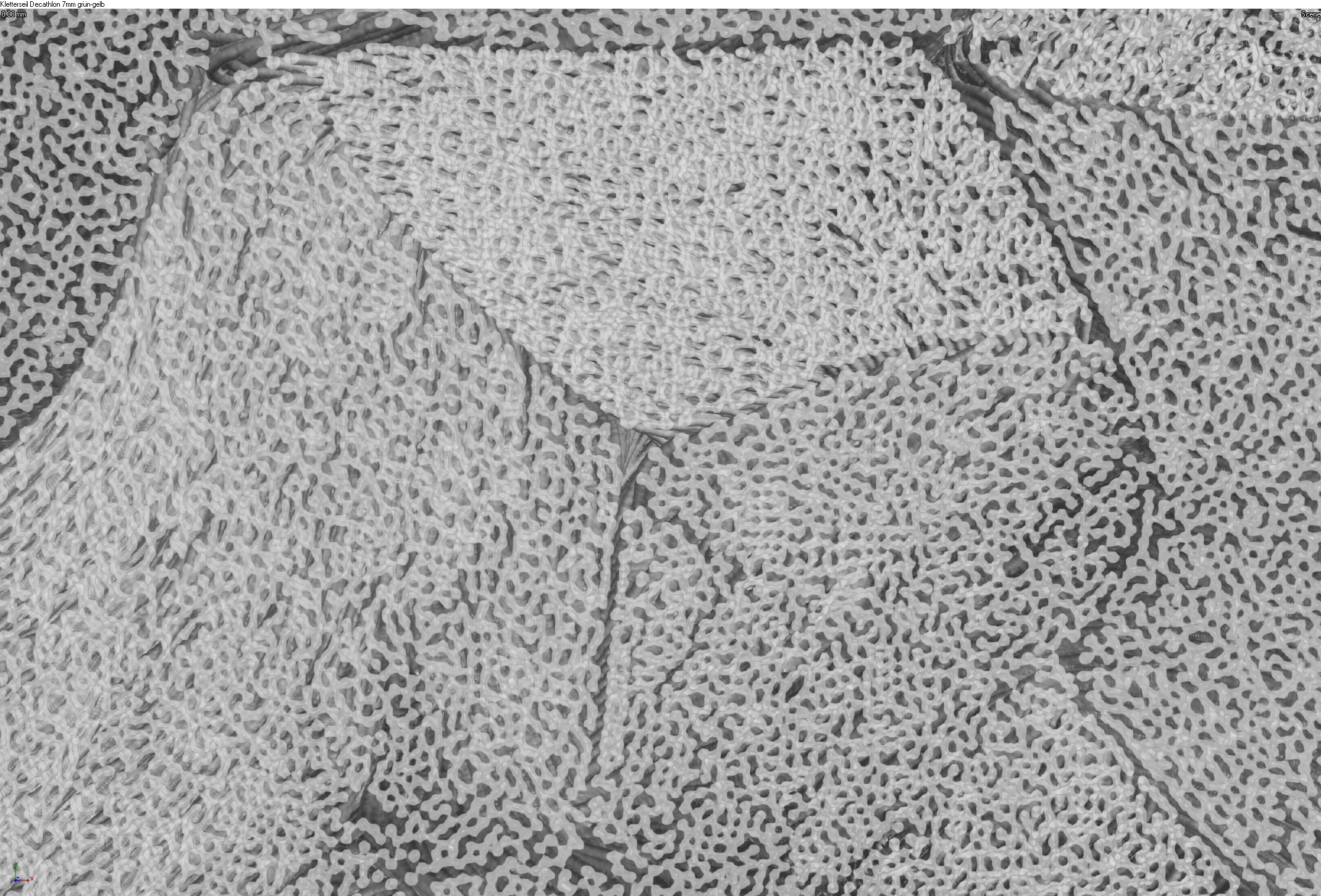

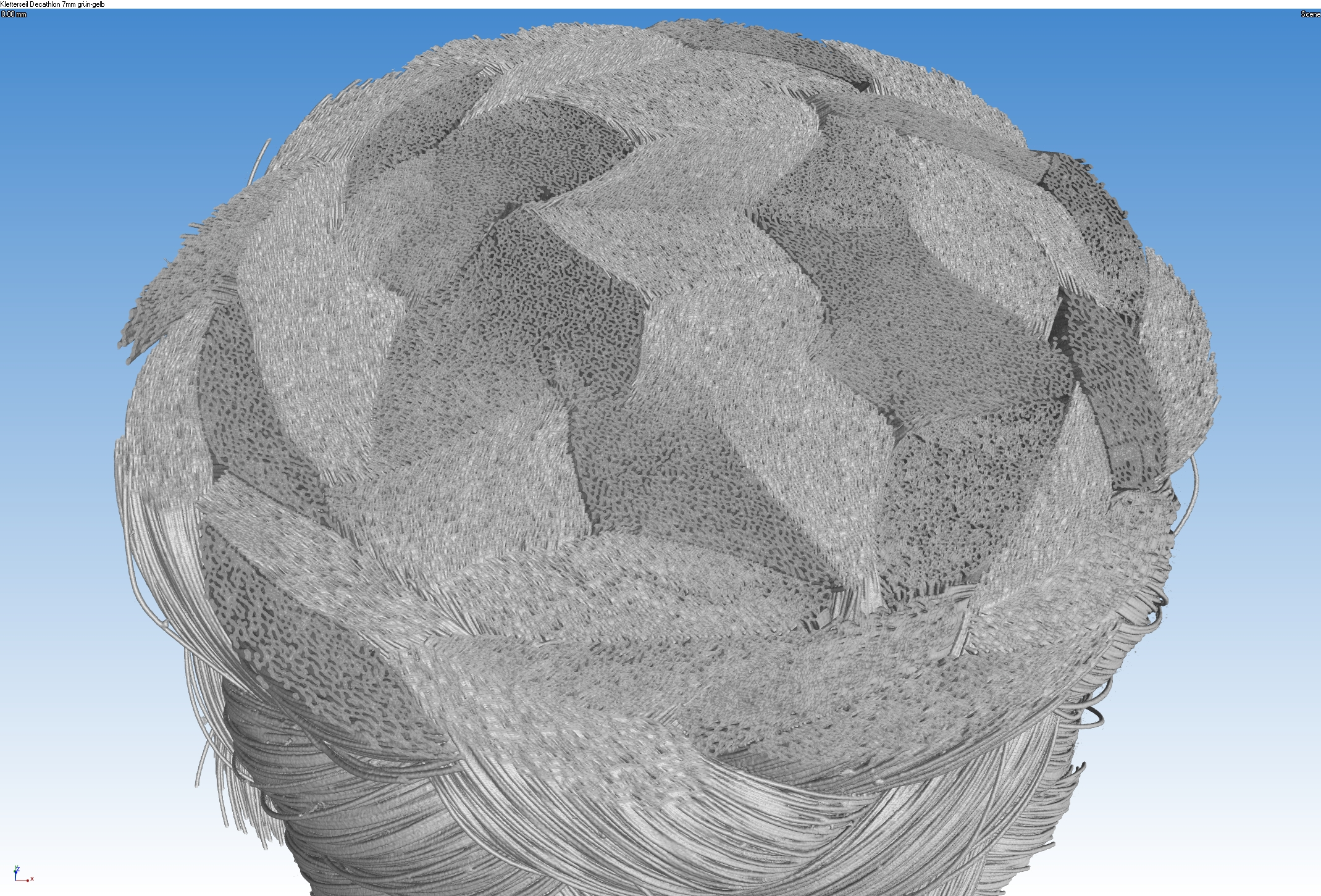

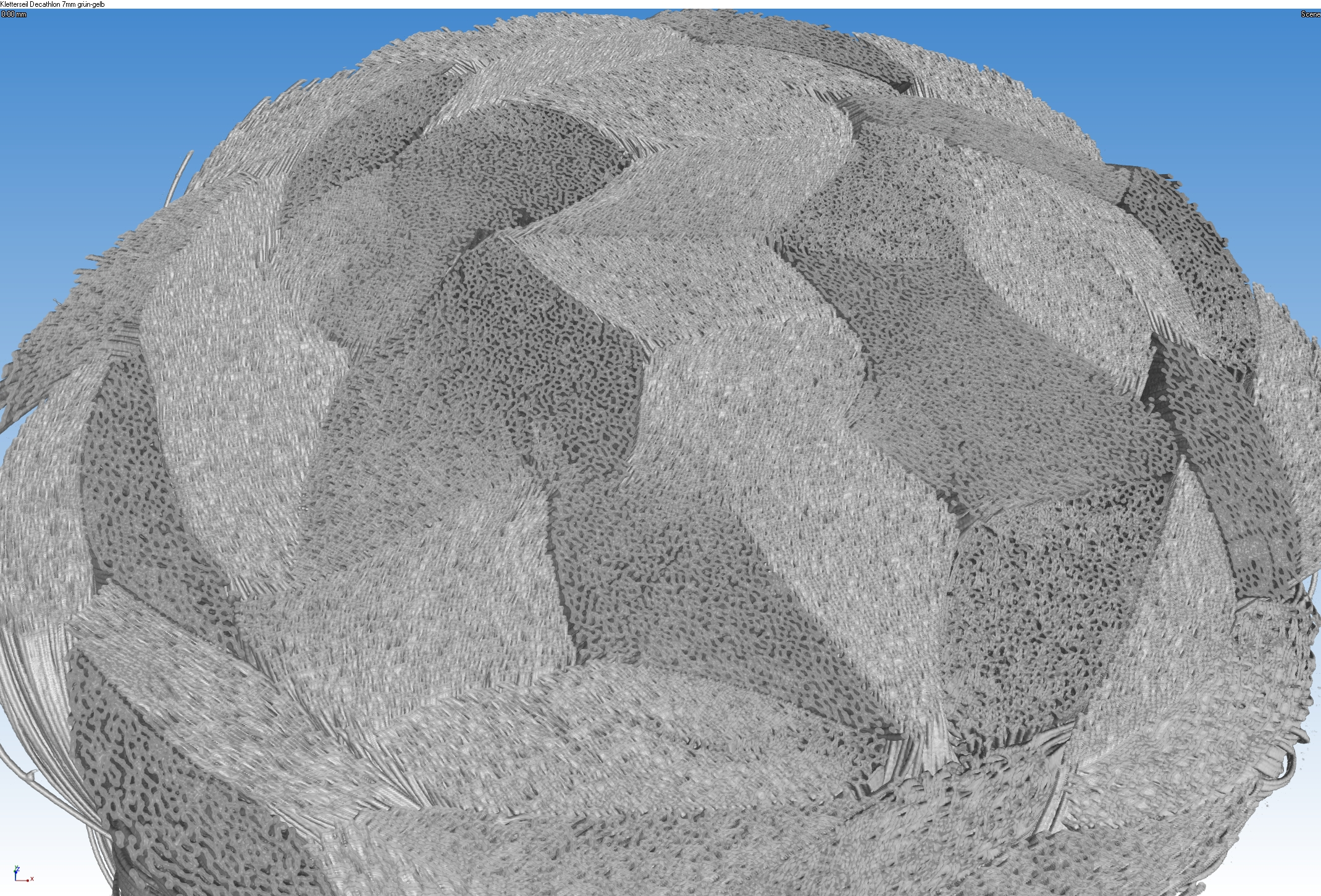

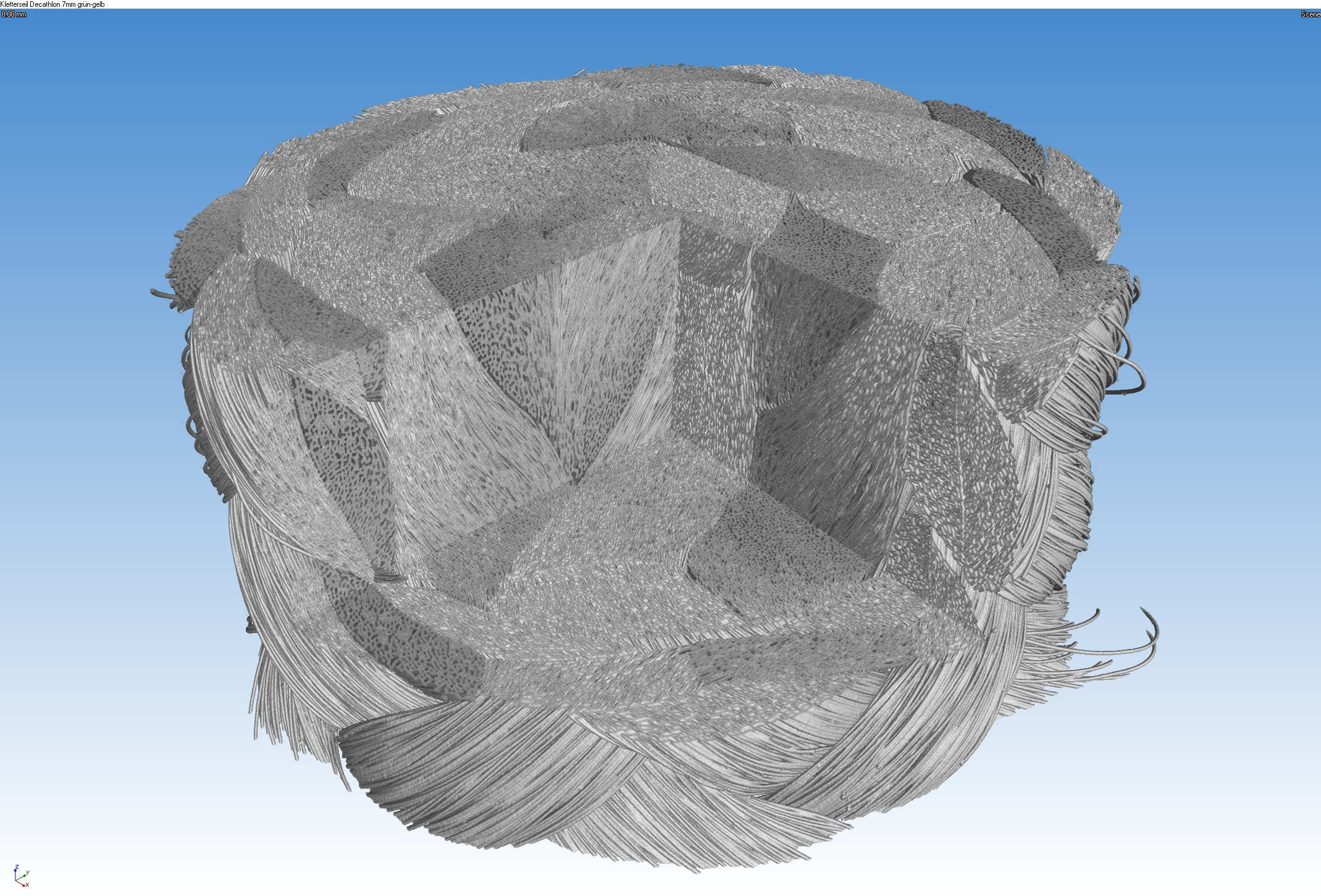

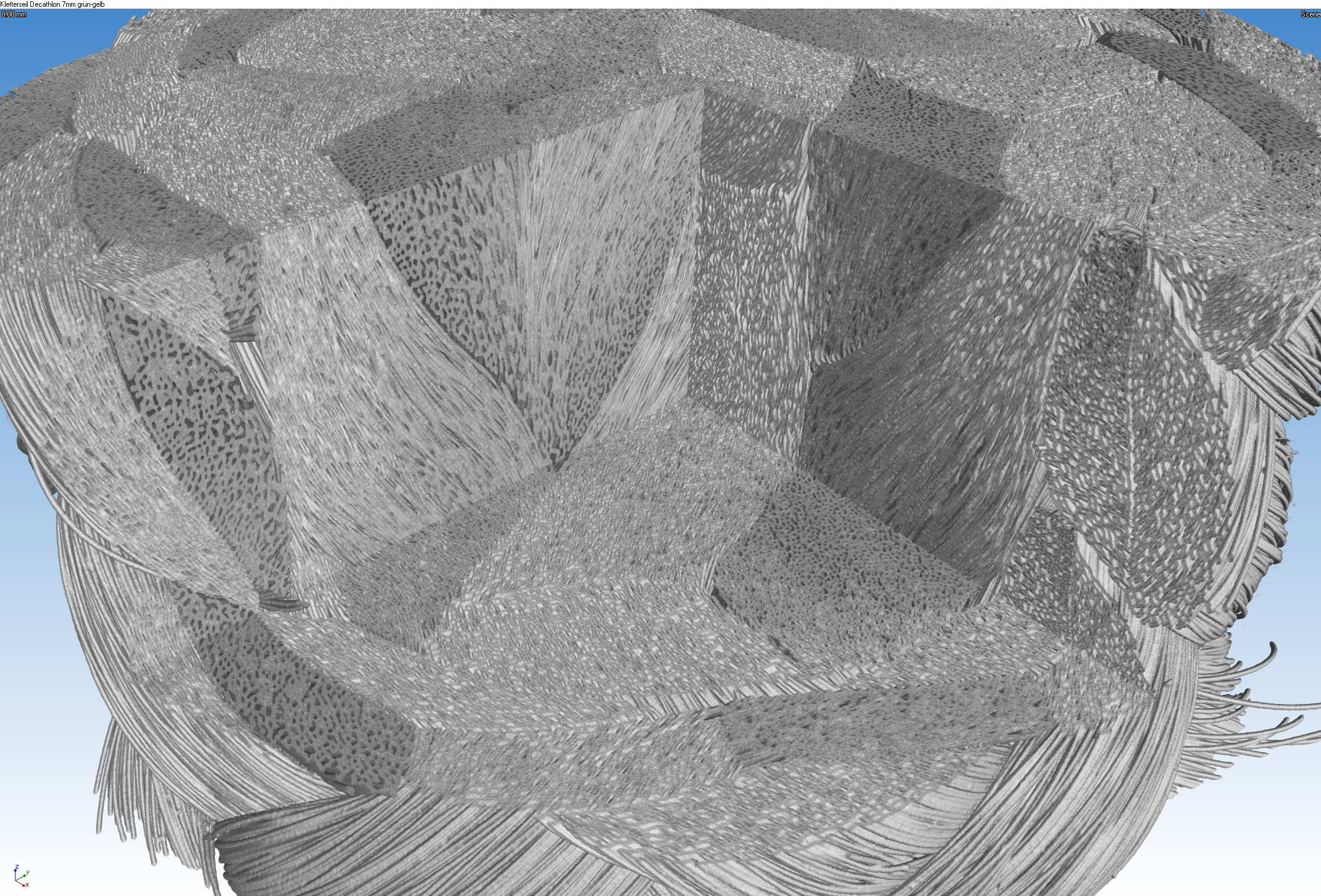

=== 3D flight-throughs/sections ===
Sections

== Handling ==
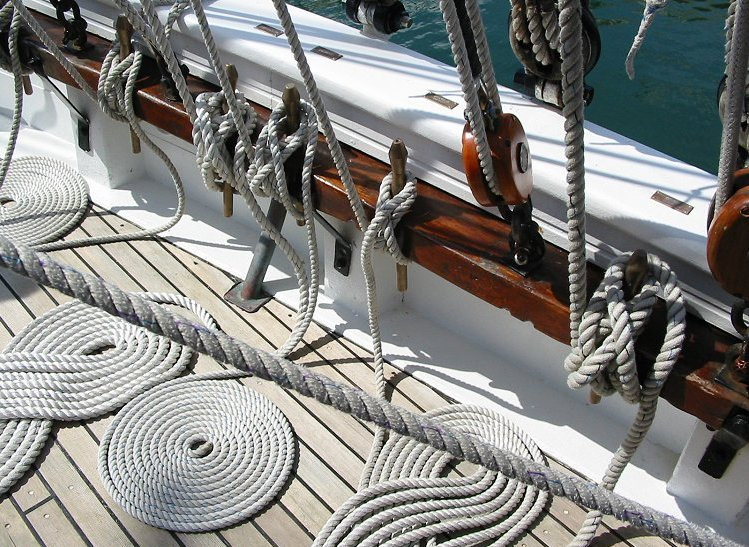
Cordage aboard the French training ship Mutin

Rope made from hemp, cotton, or nylon is generally stored in a cool, dry place for proper storage. To prevent kinking, it is usually coiled. To prevent fraying or unravelling, the ends of a rope are bound with twine (whipping), tape, or heat shrink tubing. The ends of plastic fibre ropes are often melted and fused solid; however, the rope and knotting expert Geoffrey Budworth warns against this practice thus:

Sealing rope ends this way is lazy and dangerous. A tugboat operator once sliced the palm of his hand open down to the sinews after the hardened (and obviously sharp) end of a rope that had been heat-sealed pulled through his grasp. There is no substitute for a properly made whipping.

If a load-bearing rope receives a sharp or sudden jolt or shows signs of deterioration, it is recommended that the rope be replaced immediately; it should be discarded or used only for non-load-bearing tasks.

The average rope life span is 5 years. Serious inspection should be given to the line after that point. However, the use to which a rope is put affects the frequency of inspection. Rope used in mission-critical applications, such as mooring lines or running rigging, should be regularly inspected on a much shorter timescale than this. Rope used in life-critical applications such as mountain climbing should be inspected on a far more frequent basis, up to and including before each use.

Avoid stepping on the climbing rope, as this might force tiny pieces of rock through the sheath, which can eventually deteriorate the core of the rope.

Ropes may be coiled on deck for safety, presentation, and tidiness.

Corrosive liquids, solvents, and high temperatures weaken many types of filaments in ropes. Such damage is particularly treacherous because it is often invisible to the eye.

Shock loading should be avoided with general-use ropes, as it can damage them. All ropes should be used within a safe working load, which is much less than their breaking strength.

A rope under tension – particularly if it has a great deal of elasticity – can be dangerous if parted. Care should be taken around lines under load.

== Terminology ==
"Rope" is a material and a tool. When it is assigned a specific function, it is often referred to as a "line", especially in nautical usage. A line may get a further distinction, for example, sail control lines are known as "sheets" (e.g., A jib sheet).

A halyard is a line used to raise and lower a sail, typically with a shackle on its sail end. Other maritime examples of "lines" include anchor line, mooring line, fishing line, marline. Common items include clothesline and a chalk line.

In some marine applications, the term "rope" is retained, such as man rope, bolt rope, and bell rope.

== See also ==
- Cordage Institute – International trade association
- Fid – Ropework tool (splicing tool)
- Hawser – Nautical mooring line
- International Year of Natural Fibres – United Nations observance of 2009
- Knot – Method of fastening or securing linear material
- Mooring line materials
- Rigging – Ropes, cables and chains which support masts of sailing ships
- Rope lock – Device used in theater fly systems (in theatre fly system)
- Rope splicing – Semi-permanent joint between two ropes
- Ropework – Skills for use and maintenance of rope
- Saxon Railway Museum with historic rope shunting system
- Sheet (sailing) – One of the lines on a sail ship
- Simple suspension bridge – Type of bridge
- Single-rope technique – Climbing technique
- Skipping rope, also known as Jump rope – Game in which participants jump over a swung rope
- Tightrope walking – Skill of walking along a taut wire or rope
- Whipping knot – Binding around the end of a rope to prevent it from fraying

== Sources ==
- Gaitzsch, W. Antike Korb- und Seilerwaren, Schriften des Limesmuseums Aalen Nr. 38, 1986
- Gubser, T. Die bäuerliche Seilerei, G. Krebs AG, Basel, 1965
- Hearle, John W. S. & O'Hear & McKenna, N. H. A. Handbook of Fibre Rope Technology, CRC Press, 2004
- Lane, Frederic Chapin, 1932. The Rope Factory and Hemp Trade of Venice in the Fifteenth and Sixteenth Centuries, Journal of Economic and Business History, Vol. 4 No. 4 Suppl. (August 1932).
- Militzer-Schwenger, L.: Handwerkliche Seilherstellung, Landschaftsverband Westfalen-Lippe, 1992
- Nilson, A. Studier i svenskt repslageri, Stockholm, 1961
- Pierer, H.A. Universal-Lexikon, Altenburg, 1845
- Plymouth Cordage Company, 1931. The Story of Rope; The History and the Modern Development of Rope-Making, Plymouth Cordage Company, North Plymouth, Massachusetts
- Sanctuary, Anthony, 1996. Rope, Twine and Net Making, Shire Publications Ltd., Cromwell House, Princes Risborough, Buckinghamshire.
- Schubert, Pit. Sicherheit und Risiko in Fels und Eis, Munich, 1998
- Smith, Bruce & Padgett, Allen, 1996. On Rope. North American Vertical Rope Techniques, National Speleological Society, Huntsville, Alabama.
- Strunk, P.; Abels, J. Das große Abenteuer 2.Teil, Verlag Karl Wenzel, Marburg, 1986.
- Teeter, Emily, 1987. Techniques and Terminology of Rope-Making in Ancient Egypt, Journal of Egyptian Archaeology, Vol. 73 (1987).
- Tyson, William, no date. Rope, a History of the Hard Fibre Cordage Industry in the United Kingdom, Wheatland Journals, Ltd., London.
