= Dynamic rope =

Rope designed to stretch under load

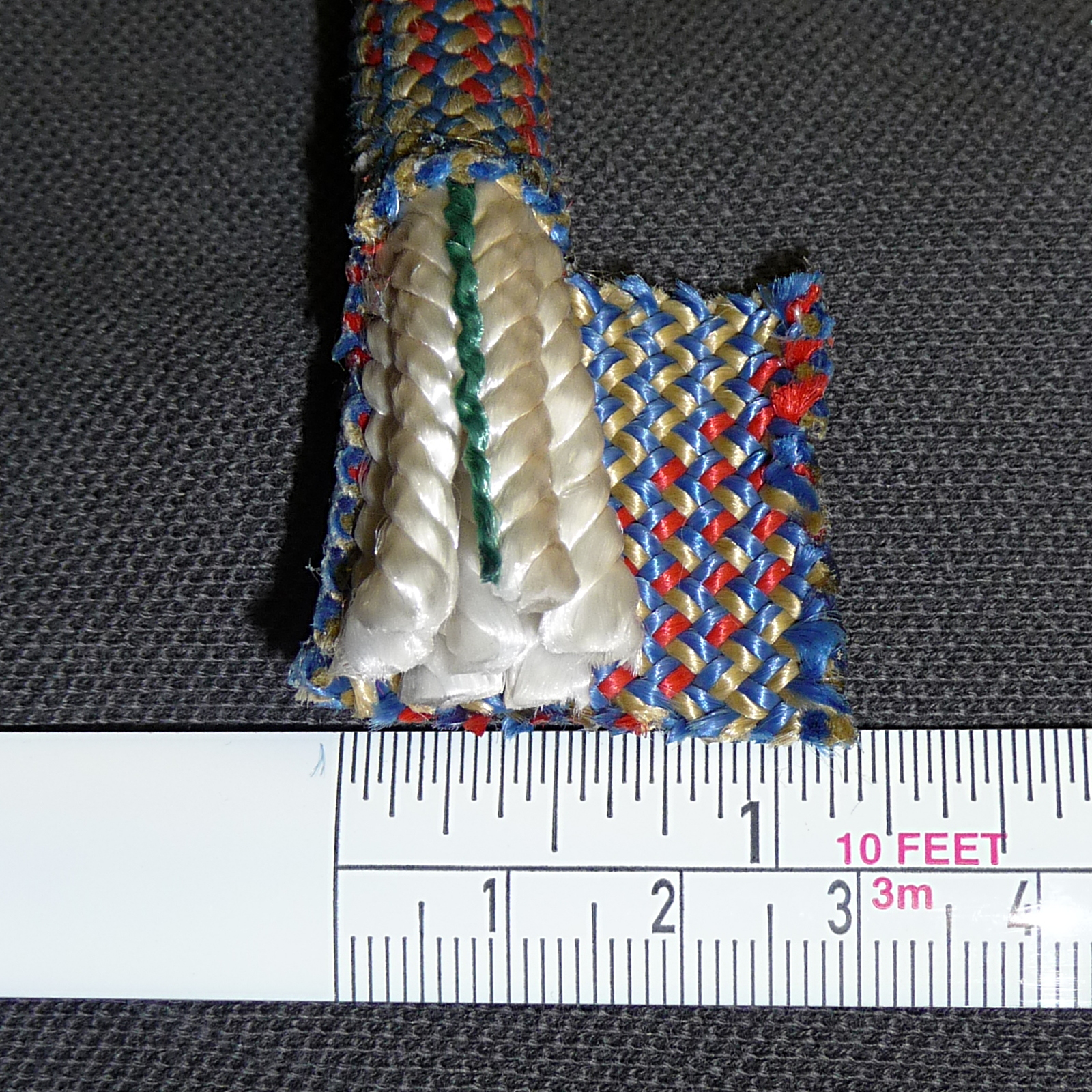
Internal structure of 10.7mm dynamic kernmantle climbing rope

A dynamic rope is a specially constructed, somewhat elastic rope used primarily in rock climbing, ice climbing, and mountaineering. This elasticity, or stretch, is the property that makes the rope dynamic—in contrast to a static rope that has only slight elongation under load. Greater elasticity allows a dynamic rope to more slowly absorb the energy of a sudden load, such from arresting a climber's fall, by reducing the peak force on the rope and thus the probability of the rope's catastrophic failure. A kernmantle rope is the most common type of dynamic rope now used. Since 1945, nylon has, because of its superior durability and strength, replaced all natural materials in climbing rope.

== Rope types ==
Dynamic climbing ropes are classified into three categories: single ropes, twin ropes, and half ropes (also referred to as 'double ropes').

Single ropes are designed to be used alone, and are by far the most common, and used for top-roping, sport climbing, and trad climbing. Twin and half ropes are used for lead climbing, and are designed to be used as a pair - they are not strong enough to be safely used on just a single strand, and they are tested to different standards as a single rope. Twin ropes are used by treating the pair of ropes as a single rope, clipping both ropes through the same carabiner at each piece of protection. Half ropes are also used as a pair, but only one rope is clipped through each piece of protection- the climber alternates which rope is clipped through each piece. On wandering routes where protection is placed far apart on either side, half ropes can significantly reduce rope drag.

Both twin and half ropes have the advantage of redundancy, as well as allowing a rappel along the full length of the climbing rope (by tying both ropes together), so that climbers can descend from a long multipitch route with fewer rappels than with a single rope. Some ropes are 'triple rated', meeting the standards for all three rope types, so they can be used in each configuration.

== Length and diameters ==
Dynamic ropes used for rock climbing come in a variety of lengths and diameters, with the most common lengths being 50 metres (164.0 ft), 60 metres (200 ft), 70 metres (230 ft). Lengths will vary depending on rope maintenance and age, and there are even ropes as long as 80 meters for specialized ascents on routes that would normally require a multi-pitch climbing attempt due to being only slightly longer than a standard rope length.

Rope diameters are generally between 8.3mm and 11.5mm, with the different diameters used for slightly different purposes. Sport and multi-pitch trad climbers often value thinner ropes because they are lighter, and have less rope drag. Thinner ropes also run more smoothly through belay devices, especially assisted braking devices or 'tube-style' devices operated in 'guide mode', which can be tedious to pull thicker or stiffer rope through. Lighter, thinner ropes, however, have less strength than a thicker rope and will sustain fewer hard falls. Note that some belay devices are better suited for different rope diameters. This is particularly relevant with assisted braking devices, such as the Petzl Grigri (which, for example, works best with a 9.4-10.3 mm thick line) or the Faders SUM. Users must make sure to read the instructions for the device carefully to ensure safety and recognize any limitations to rope diameter.

== Standards and testing ==
All modern rock climbing dynamic ropes rated by the UIAA must meet certain standards and pass testing for Construction, Sheath Slippage, Static Elongation, Impact Force on first fall, and Number of falls held. The force rating indicates the maximum amount of force the rope can deliver to a falling climber, measured in kilonewtons (kN), under test conditions designed to simulate a hard fall; typical climbing ropes range from 9kN up to an Arborist's 24kN. The force rating is often misunderstood by climbers, because all other climbing gear is rated by the breaking strength (in kN) of the material. Whereas a higher rating (indicating greater strength) is desired for other gear, for dynamic ropes a lower rating is generally desired, as this indicates it would give a 'soft catch' that is less likely to injure the climber or break or dislodge protection or anchors.

Unlike most climbing equipment, dynamic ropes do not have a rated tensile breaking strength. Instead, the strength of a rope is tested by the number of standard test falls a rope can sustain before breaking. The test falls use an 80 kg weight for single ropes (55 kg for half ropes), and a fall factor of 1.7 (4 meter fall on 2.3 meters of rope). This test simulates a very hard fall that would rarely occur. When climbing, it is possible to produce a fall factor as high as 2, however, real-world climbing situations include additional shock absorbing elements which are not included in the test standard, such as the body of both the climber and belayer, elasticity of their harnesses and anchor materials, and friction between the rope and the belay device, and any protection pieces. Single ropes must sustain at least 5 such falls before breaking, and a rope that can sustain more than 9 falls is considered a 'multifall' rope. In practice, climbing ropes rarely if ever break due to a fall alone- all documented rope failures involve the rope being cut or damaged, for example by abrasion against a sharp rock edge. Ropes are especially vulnerable to being cut while they are weighted with the body of the climber, and moving over a sharp edge (for example if a following climber is resting his weight on the rope, or using the rope for assistance, while swinging or traversing under a roof, while being belayed from above). In general, thicker ropes will be stronger and more durable, and have a higher fall rating.

== Rope care and maintenance ==
Modern ropes are made from nylon and don't require a great deal of maintenance. Ropes that are frequently used are often inspected for cuts, abrasions, or frayed areas; any cut or fraying that passes into the core of the rope is cause for concern. Ropes can also be washed to clean them of any extensive dirt or grime. Ropes must also be kept away from chemicals or seawater which may damage them, and not stored for long periods in direct sunlight which can cause UV damage over time.

Every fall lessens the amount of impact a rope can later absorb, and hard falls can seriously compromise the strength of a rope, without showing obvious signs of wear. One definition of a 'hard fall' is a long fall (> 10–15 meters) with a fall factor greater than one. Manufacturers often recommended that ropes be retired if they sustain an extremely hard fall, even if they do not show outward signs of wear.

== See also ==
- Climbing equipment
- Climbing rope
- Fall factor
- Static rope
