= Fall factor =

Mathematical ratio relevant to climbing safety

The climber will fall about the same height h in both cases, but they will be subjected to a greater force at position 1, due to the greater fall factor.

In lead climbing using a dynamic rope, the fall factor (f) is the ratio of the height (h) a climber falls before the climber's rope begins to stretch and the rope length (L) available to absorb the energy of the fall,

$$f = \frac{h}{L}.$$

It is the main factor determining the violence of the forces acting on the climber and the gear.

As a numerical example, consider a fall of 20 feet that occurs with 10 feet of rope out (i.e., the climber has placed no protection and falls from 10 feet above the belayer to 10 feet below—a factor 2 fall). This fall produces far more force on the climber and the gear than if a similar 20 foot fall had occurred 100 feet above the belayer. In the latter case (a fall factor of 0.2), the rope acts like a bigger, longer rubber band, and its stretch more effectively cushions the fall.

== Sizes of fall factors ==
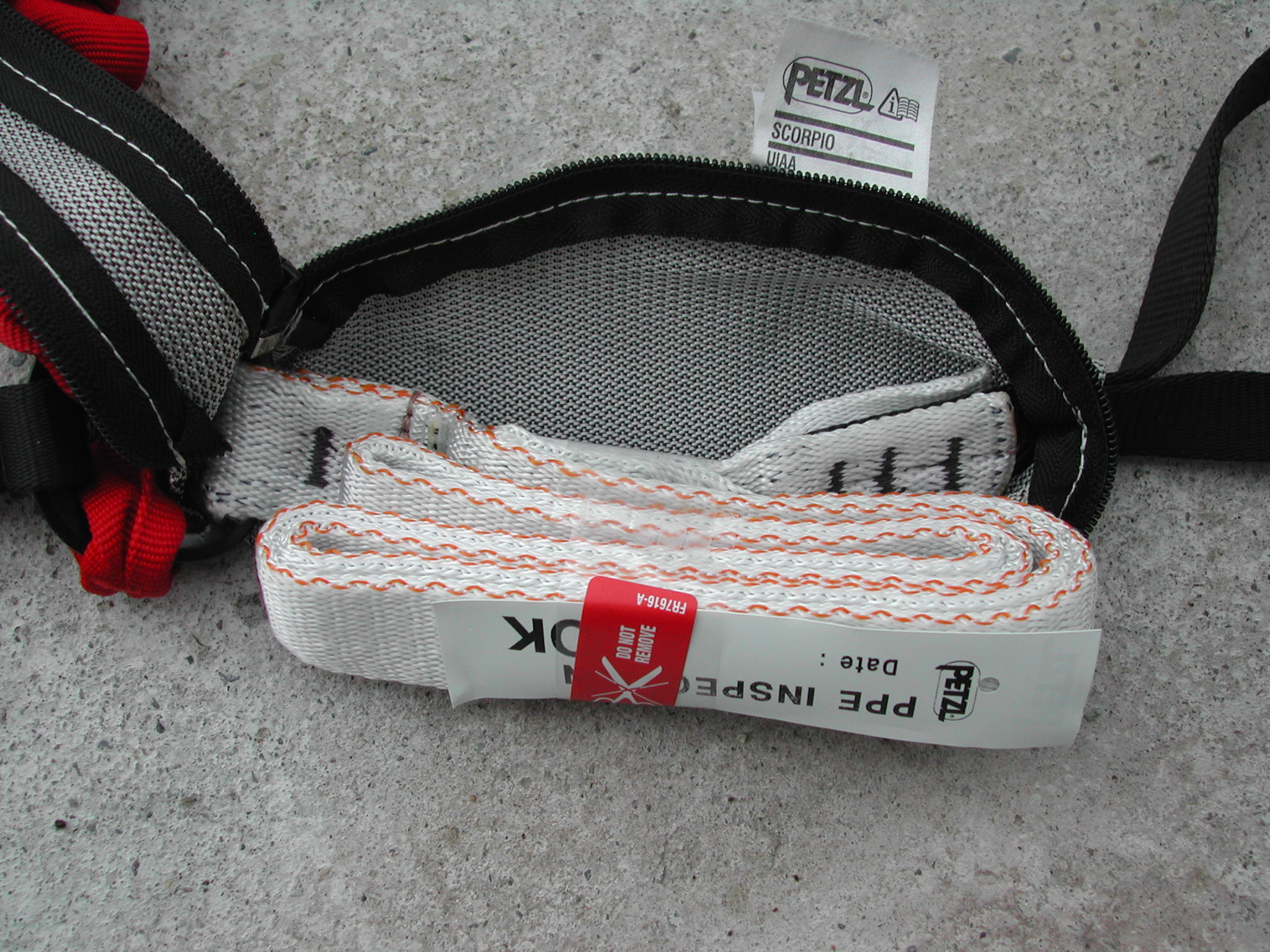
Energy absorber

The smallest possible fall factor is zero. This occurs, for example, in top-rope a fall onto a rope with no slack. The rope stretches, so although h=0, there is a fall.

When climbing from the ground up, the maximum possible fall factor is 1, since any greater fall would mean that the climber hit the ground.

In multi-pitch climbing (and big wall climbing), or in any climb where a leader starts from a position on an exposed ledge well above the ground, a fall factor in lead climbing can be as high as 2. This can occur only when a lead climber who has placed no protection falls past the belayer (two times the distance of the rope length between them), or the anchor if the climber is solo climbing the route using a self-belay. As soon as the climber clips the rope into protection above the belay, the fall factor drops below 2.

In falls occurring on a via ferrata, fall factors can be much higher. This is possible because the length of rope between the harness and the carabiner is short and fixed, while the distance the climber can fall depends on the gaps between anchor points of the safety cable (i.e. the climber's lanyard will fall down the safety cable until it reaches an anchor point); to mitigate this, via ferrata climbers can use energy absorbers.

== Derivation and impact force ==
The impact force is defined as the maximum tension in the rope when a climber falls. We first state an equation for this quantity and describe its interpretation, and then show its derivation and how it can be put into a more convenient form.

=== Equation for the impact force and its interpretation ===
When modeling the rope as an undamped harmonic oscillator (HO) the impact force F_{max} in the rope is given by:

$$F_{max} = mg + \sqrt{(mg)^2 + 2mghk},$$

where mg is the climber's weight, h is the fall height and k is the spring constant of the portion of the rope that is in play.

We will see below that when varying the height of the fall while keeping the fall factor fixed, the quantity hk stays constant.

There are two factors of 2 involved in the interpretation of this equation. First, the maximum force on the top piece of protection is roughly 2F_{max}, since the two sides of the rope around that piece both pull downward with force F_{max} each. Second, it may seem strange that even when h=0, we have F_{max}=2mg (so that the maximum force on the top piece is approximately 4mg). This is because a factor-zero fall is the sudden weighting of a slack rope with weight mg. The climber falls, picking up speed as the earth pulls them downward and, simultaneously, the rope stretches and pulls upward on them. The climber starts slowing down when the upward force generated by the stretching rope equals the gravitational force mg. They then keep moving downward because of their momentum but now they are slowing down, not speeding up. Eventually they come to a stop and at that instant the rope is at maximum tension pulling upward on the climber by a force of 2mg. Because this upward force by the rope is more than the weight mg downward, the climber then yo-yo's up. The yo-yo'ing will eventually stop when the fall energy has all dissipated by frictional forces between (and within) the rope, the protection pieces and the harness.

=== Derivation of the equation ===
Conservation of energy at rope's maximum elongation x_{max} gives

$$mgh = \frac{1}{2}kx_{max}^2 - mgx_{max}\ ;  \      F_{max} = k x_{max}.$$

The maximum force on the climber is F_{max}-mg. It is convenient to express things in terms of the elastic modulus E = k L/q which is a property of the material that the rope is constructed from. Here L is the rope's length and q its cross-sectional area. Solution of the quadratic gives

$$F_{max} = mg + \sqrt{(mg)^2 + 2mgEqf}.$$

Other than fixed properties of the system, this form of the equation shows that the impact force depends only on the fall factor.

Using the HO model to obtain the impact force of real climbing ropes as a function of fall height h and climber's weight mg, one must know the experimental value for E of a given rope. However, rope manufacturers give only the rope’s impact force F_{0} and its static and dynamic elongations that are measured under standard UIAA fall conditions: A fall height h_{0} of 2 × 2.3 m with an available rope length L_{0} = 2.6m leads to a fall factor f_{0} = h_{0}/L_{0} = 1.77 and a fall velocity v_{0} = (2gh_{0})^{1/2} = 9.5 m/s at the end of falling the distance h_{0}. The mass m_{0} used in the fall is 80 kg. Using these values to eliminate the unknown quantity E leads to an expression of the impact force as a function of arbitrary fall heights h, arbitrary fall factors f, and arbitrary gravity g of the form:

$$F_{max} = mg + \sqrt{(mg)^2 + F_0(F_0-2m_0g_0)\frac{m}{m_0}\frac{g}{g_0}\frac{f}{f_0}}$$

Note that keeping g_{0} from the derivation of "Eq" based on UIAA test into the above F_{max} formula assures that the transformation will continue to be valid for different gravity fields, as over a slope making less than 90 degrees with the horizontal. This simple undamped harmonic oscillator model of a rope, however, does not correctly describe the entire fall process of real ropes. Accurate measurements on the behaviour of a climbing rope during the entire fall can be explained if the undamped harmonic oscillator is complemented by a non-linear term up to the maximum impact force, and then, near the maximum force in the rope, internal friction in the rope is added that ensures the rapid relaxation of the rope to its rest position.

=== Effect of friction ===
When the rope is clipped into several carabiners between the climber and the belayer, an additional type of friction occurs, the so-called dry friction between the rope and particularly the last clipped carabiner. "Dry" friction (i.e., a frictional force that is velocity-independent) leads to an effective rope length smaller than the available length L and thus increases the impact force.

== See also ==
- Whipper
