= Aill na Cronain =

Inland limestone cliff in The Burren, Ireland

- Irish: Aill na Crónáin; Cronan's cliff
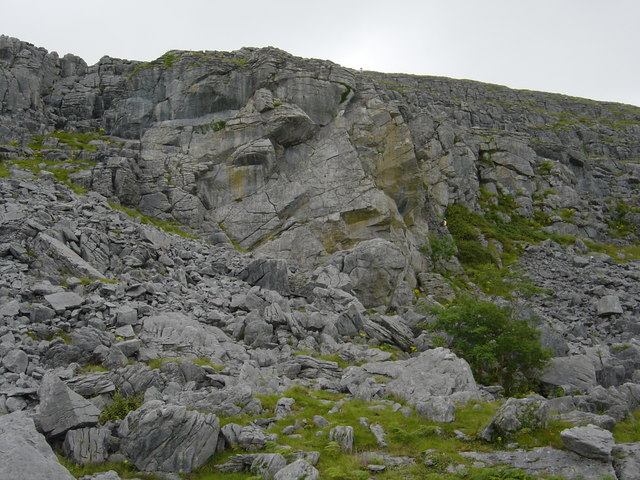
- "Skull Buttress" in the middle of Aill na Cronain showing the flat Skull Slab VDiff–climb in centre

- Location within Ireland
- Location: The Burren; County Clare; Ireland
- Nearest city: 3.5 km south of Ballyvaughan
- Range: The Burren
- Coordinates: 53°05′47″N 9°08′20″W
- Type of climbing: Traditional; Abseiling
- Height range: 25 metres at highest point (most climbs 10–15 metres)
- Pitches range: Single pitch
- Technical grades: mostly D to HS; little above HVS
- Rock type: Limestone
- Quantity of routes: +70 routes online database; 50 routes 2008 guidebook
- Climbing area developed: No Facilities; No Fresh Water
- Cliff aspect: West
- Elevation: circa 150 metres above sea level
- Ownership: Private property
- Camping: Aill na Cronain (none); Fanore (paid); Ballyvaughan (paid)
- Classic climbs: Skull Slab (VD), Raven (E3 6a), Mayday (VS), Demon Dim (HVS), Poetic Majesty (VS),
- Website: Climbing.ie Aill na Cronain

Aill na Cronain (Irish: Aill na Crónáin; Cronan's cliff) is an inland west-facing limestone crag in The Burren in County Clare, Ireland. It is popular with novice rock climbers due to the number of short single-pitch 10–20 metre rock climbing routes in the S to HS rock climbing grades. It is beside the Aillwee Caves.

== Rock climbing ==
The crag is accessed by a 10–minute walk northwards from the upper car-park of the Ailwee Cave attraction (see map below). The crag is on private property but rock climbing has been allowed since the early 1970s, with the earliest recorded rock climbing routes dating from circa 1971. The UKClimbing online logbook notes that: "Skull slab is probably one of the best VDiffs you'll find in the country". Aill na Cronain is also listed in Ireland's Adventure Bucket List, which says that: "If you are just starting out [rock climbing], one of the best spots to visit is Aill na Cronain, just beside the Ailwee Cave".

In terms of layout, the centre of Aill na Cronain is the "Skull Buttress" which has a distinctive skull–appearance when viewed from a distance. Its "nose" contains the flat Skull Slab VD–grade climb. The "East Side" face, and "Far East Side" face, lie to the north of Skull Buttress. The "Butterfly" face, and the "Small Wall" face lie to its south. While most routes are between S and HS, more challenging routes have been put up on the "Skull Buttress" such as Raven (E3 6a), Monkey Business (E2 5c), and Sunbane (E1 5c).

Aill na Cronain is in the County Clare townland of Ballycahill. Just over 23 kilometers to the southwest of Aill na Cronain is the more advanced rock climbing limestone sea–cliff called Ailladie, which contains some of Ireland's most advanced rock climbs.

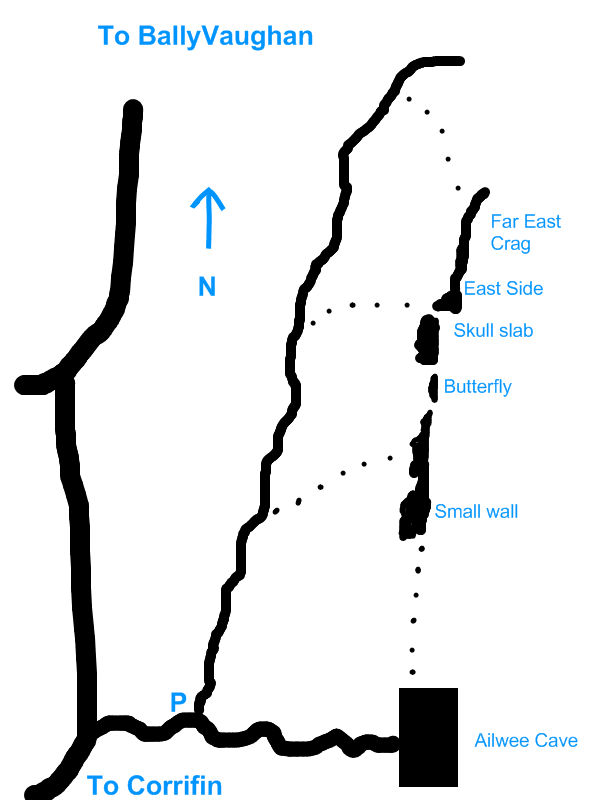
The layout of popular novice rock climbing venue, Aill Na Cronain, in The Burren, County Clare, Ireland

== Climbing bibliography ==
- Owens, Peter (2008). Climbs in the Burren and Aran Islands. Mountaineering Ireland. ISBN 0-902940-21-X.

== See also ==
- Ailladie, major rock climbing limestone sea-cliff in County Clare
- Ballyryan, inland rock climbing limestone crag in County Clare, right beside Ailladie
- Fair Head, major rock climbing dolerite mountain crag in County Antrim
- Dalkey Quarry, major rock climbing granite quarry in Dublin
