= Ballyryan =

Inland limestone cliff in The Burren, Ireland

Ballyryan (Ballyreen)
- Irish: Baile Uí Rinn; Ring's homestead
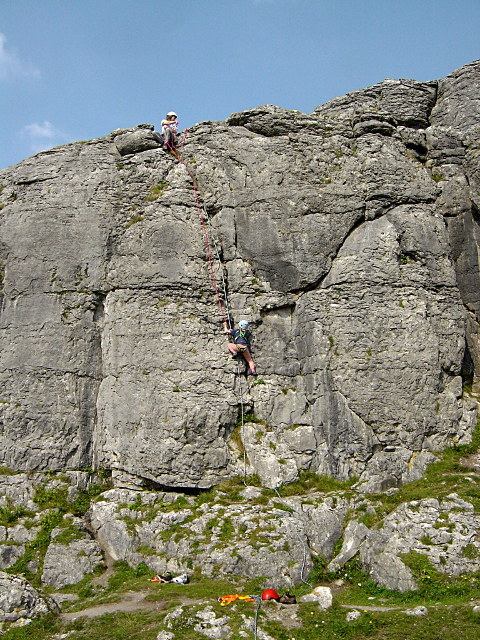
- Climbers on Right Crack (VDiff) in Ballyran

- Location within Ireland
- Location: The Burren; County Clare; Ireland
- Nearest city: 6 km south of Fanore; 8 km north of Doolin
- Range: The Burren
- Coordinates: 53°04′00″N 9°21′32″W
- Type of climbing: Traditional; Abseiling
- Height range: 15 metres at highest point
- Pitches range: Single pitch
- Technical grades: mostly D to VS; several above E1
- Rock type: Limestone
- Quantity of routes: +35 routes online database; 30 routes 2008 guidebook
- Climbing area developed: Roadside Parking; No Facilities; No Fresh Water
- Cliff aspect: West
- Elevation: circa 25 metres above sea level
- Ownership: Private property
- Camping: Ailladie (free); Fanore (paid); Doolin (paid)
- Classic climbs: Right Crack (VD).; Vulgarian (S).; Alcove Crack (HS).; Triumph Crack (HS).; Mannerless Monster (HS).; Slave Labour (E1 5b).
- Website: Climbing.ie Ballyryan

Ballyryan or Ballyreen (Irish: Baile Uí Rinn; Ring's homestead) is a small inland mostly west-facing limestone crag in The Burren in County Clare, Ireland. It is popular with rock climbers due to its easy access, the range of short easy-to-intermediate rock climbs, and its close proximity to the much larger and highly regarded, Ailladie rock-climbing sea-cliff; Ailladie is also locally known as the Ballyreen Cliffs or Ballyreen Point.

== Rock climbing ==
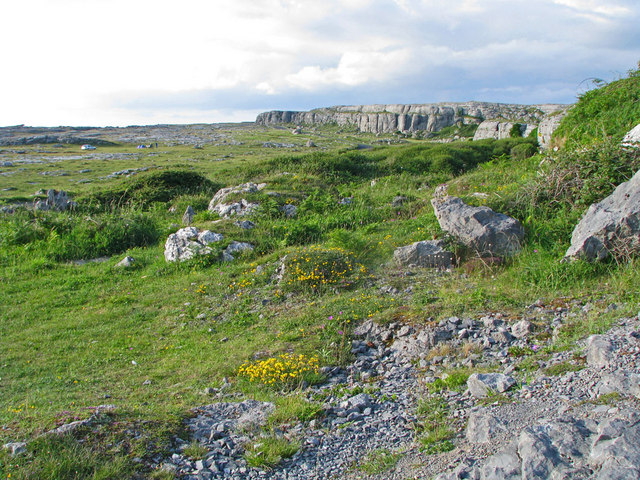
Ballyryan crag from the south

The Ballyryan rock climbing crag is located right beside the Ailladie Car Park on the R477 road, which is opposite the Stone Wall section of the Ailladie sea–cliff (see map below). While Ballyran's first rock climbing routes date from the early 1970s (e.g. Whose Corner (VS 4c), and Whacky (HS) grade), it is noted that Irish "Tiglin" climbing groups conducted courses on many Ballyryan routes without recording their ascents.

While most of Ballyryan's routes are circa 10–12 metres high and between Diff to HVS, its proximity to Ailladie, with its numerous severe climbs, has led to a number of E–grade climbs being put up in the crag, namely, Agony Aunt (E2 5c) and Crack 90 (E3 6a). For various reasons, Ballyryan's rock climbing routes are sometimes described as being "difficult to protect" when "leading", and therefore an extra degree of caution is needed. Novice climbers can "toprope" for safety.

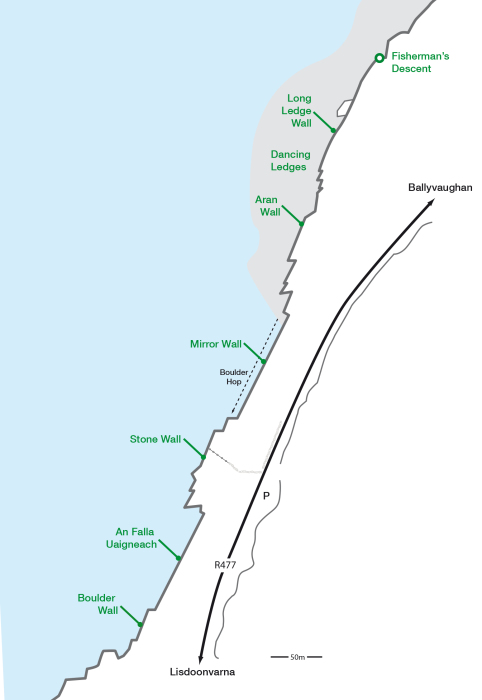
Layout of Ailladie and Ballyryan (Ballyran is just south of the Ailladie car-park, labelled P in the map)

The cliff is named after the townland in which it is located, Ballyryan; the term Ballyreen is also used locally.

== Climbing bibliography ==
- Owens, Peter (2008). Climbs in the Burren and Aran Islands. Mountaineering Ireland. ISBN 0-902940-21-X.

== See also ==
- Ailladie, major rock climbing limestone sea–cliff in County Clare
- Aill na Cronain, inland rock climbing limestone crag in County Clare, right beside the Aillwee Cave
- Fair Head, major rock climbing dolerite mountain crag in County Antrim
- Dalkey Quarry, major rock climbing granite quarry in Dublin
