= Dalkey (disambiguation) =

Dalkey may refer to:

- Dalkey Island off the coast of Ireland
- Dalkey, a suburb of Dublin in Ireland named for the island
  - Dalkey Atmospheric Railway (1843-1854)
  - Dalkey railway station (1854-1964)
  - Dalkey Hill overlooks the village
    - Dalkey Quarry, disuse granite quarry (1815-1917)
  - Dalkey School Project, a multidenominational school established in 1978 at Glenageary in Ireland
  - Dalkey Book Festival, annual literature festival held in Dalkey, Ireland since 2010
- Hundred of Dalkey, a cadastral unit in South Australia, named after the Irish village
  - Dalkey, South Australia, a locality named after the Hundred
  - District Council of Dalkey (1875-1932)
- Dalkey Archive Press, American publisher founded in 1984
  - The Dalkey Archive, 1964 novel by Irish writer Flann O'Brien
