= Dermot Somers =

Irish mountain climber

- Born: 1947 (age 78–79); Tremane, County Roscommon, Ireland
- Education: University College Dublin
- Occupations: Writer, mountaineer, explorer, public speaker
- Writing career
- Language: Irish, English

Dermot Somers (born 1947, Tremane, County Roscommon, Ireland) is an Irish mountaineer, explorer, writer, and broadcaster. He was educated in the Irish-speaking Coláiste Mhuire, Dublin, and graduated from University College Dublin with a BA and HDipEd, and worked for a time as a teacher, before concentrating full-time on writing, broadcasting, and travelling. He now lives in Drogheda.

== Climbing career ==
Somers started climbing in 1974 at the age of 27, and became one of the leading rock-climbers in Ireland in the 1970s, establishing significant new routes in areas such as Ailladie (The Ramp), Fair Head (An Gobán Saor, Fáth mo Bhuartha), Muckross Head, and Tormore in County Sligo. In 1983, he became the first Irishman to have climbed the six great north faces of the Alps. He participated in Irish expeditions to Himalayan peaks Changtse in 1987, Manaslu in 1991, and Everest in 1993. He has also climbed in the Andes and other greater ranges.

== Writing and broadcasting ==
He has written several books in both Irish and English, documenting his travels, and also volumes of fictional short stories. His publications include:

- Nightfall, a short story about a climb of the Eiger Nordwand at the outbreak of World War III, in the short-lived The Irish Climber magazine (MCI, 1983)
- Mountains and Other Ghosts, a collection of short stories. (Diadem Books, 1990) ISBN 0-906371-48-1, ISBN 0-906371-68-6
- At the Rising of the Moon, a collection of short stories, which won the 1994 Boardman Tasker Prize for Mountain Literature and the Culture and Environment Award at the 1994 Banff Mountain Book Festival. (Baton Wicks, Collins Press, 1994) ISBN 0-906371-14-7, ISBN 0-906371-64-3, ISBN 1-898573-05-0, ISBN 1-898256-07-1
- Rince ar na Ballaí, accounts of Somers's mountaineering and exploration adventures. which won the Oireachtas Award for Literature. (Cois Life, 2002) ISBN 1-901176-33-9
- Collected Short Stories, an amalgamation of Mountains and Other Ghosts and At the Rising of the Moon. (Baton Wicks, 2004) ISBN 1-898573-50-6
- Endurance: Heroic Journeys in Ireland, a collection of epic journeys from Irish history and mythology. (O'Brien Press, 2005 ) ISBN 0-86278-797-1
- Buaic, a mountaineering novel. (Cois Life, 2006) ISBN 1-901176-66-5
- Ar Muir is ar Sliabh, a novel (Cois Life, 2009) ISBN 978-1-901176-97-1

He has written and presented several programmes and series for radio and television, covering themes of mountaineering and exploration and Irish landscape and folklore. The television productions were mostly commissioned by RTÉ and TG4 and produced by John Murray of Crossing The Line Films. The productions include:

- Cuairt na Cruinne (Above the Clouds), which featured Dermot climbing with various guests, on the Eiger, Mount Kenya, Nepal, Yosemite, Scotland, and Peru. The Eiger episode won the Best Documentary award at the 1998 Celtic Film & TV Festival.
- An Bealach Ó Dheas (Wild Ireland), a series which featured Dermot walking the length of Ireland from Malin Head to Mizen Head, exploring interesting places along the way.
- Turas Feasa, a series which had Dermot following seven great Irish walks.
- Turas Tréadacha (Great Nomadic Journeys), a series of films with Dermot joining local nomads on some of the world's great nomadic journeys, including Siberia (2001), the Sahara (2002), Iran (An Bealach in Airde) (2004), and Nepal (Bealach an tSalainn is an Yak) (2008).
- Friends in High Places, a radio series featuring Somers climbing and walking and talking with various well-known guests, including politician Martin McGuinness and former champion cyclist and now mountaineer Sé O'Hanlon.
- On the Trail of the Táin, a radio series about Táin Bó Cuailnge (2004)
