= Ailladie =

Limestone sea cliff in the Burren, Ireland

- Aill an Daill; Ballyreen Cliffs
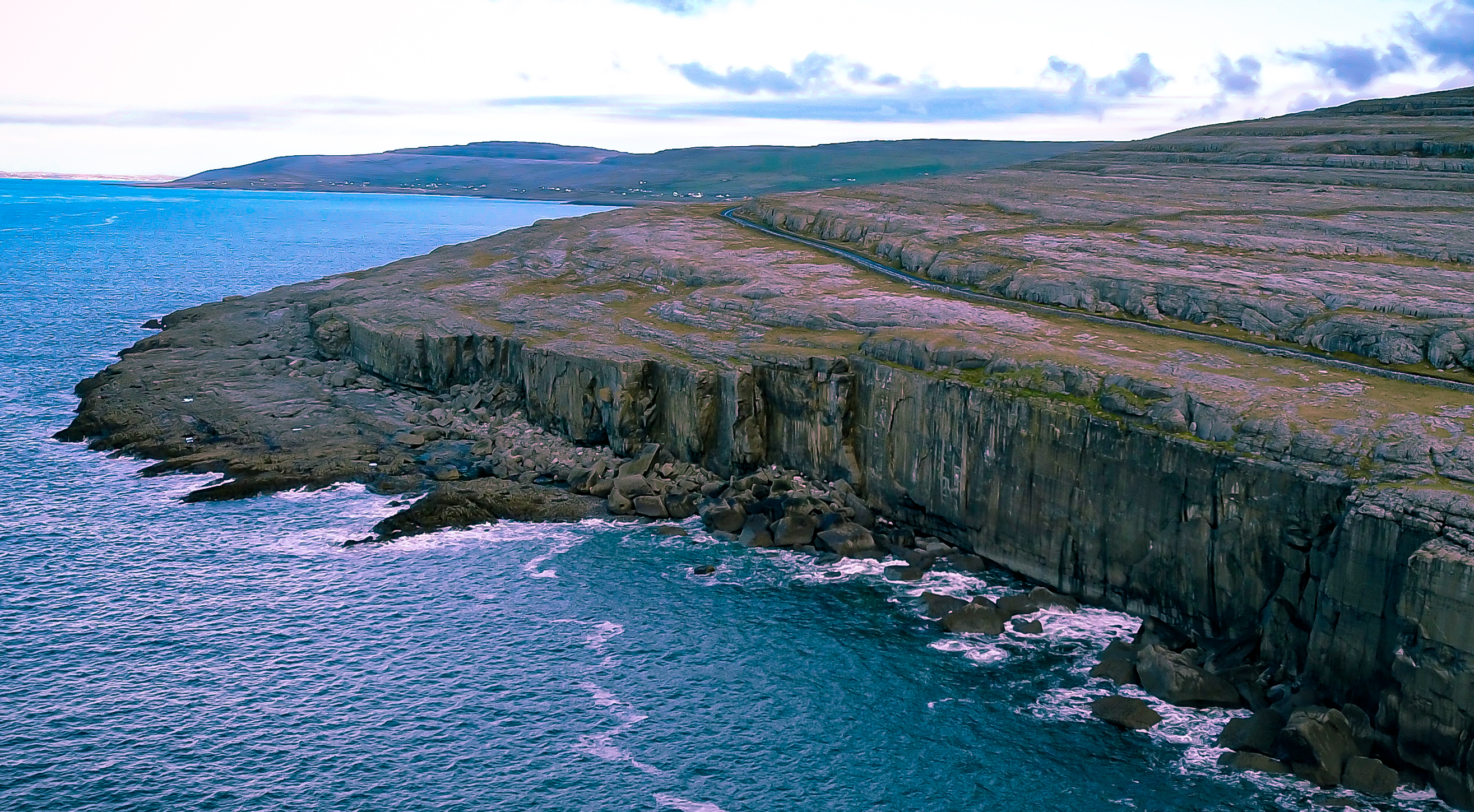
- Aerial view of the cliff

- Location within Ireland
- Location: The Burren; County Clare; Ireland
- Nearest city: 6 km south of Fanore; 8 km north of Doolin
- Range: The Burren
- Coordinates: 53°04′14″N 09°21′30″W
- Type of climbing: Traditional climbing; Crack climbing; Deep water soloing
- Height range: circa 35 metres (115 ft) above sea level at its peak
- Pitches range: Single pitch
- Technical grades: Diff to E7; Little below VS; Majority above E1 5b
- Rock type: Limestone
- Quantity of routes: +200 routes online database; 170 routes 2008 guidebook
- Climbing area developed: Partial with significant opportunity for new routes
- Cliff aspect: West
- Elevation: At sea level
- Camping: Ailladie (free); Fanore (paid); Doolin (paid)
- Guidebook: Climbs in the Burren and Aran Islands
- Classic climbs: Pis Fluich (HVS 5a); Gallows Pole (E2 5c); Skywalker (E3 5c); Kleptomaniac (E3 6a); Through Looking Glass (E3 6a); Wall of Fossils (E4 6a); The Cutter (E4 6a); Refraction (E5 6a); Ouicksilver (E5 6a); On Reflection (E6 6a)
- Website: Climbing.ie Ailladie

Ailladie (Irish: Aill an Daill, lit. 'Blind Man's Cliff'; also known locally as the Ballyreen Cliffs), is an 800-metre-long (2,600 ft) west-facing limestone sea cliff, that varies in height from 8 metres (26 ft) to 35 metres (115 ft), situated on the coast of The Burren in County Clare, Ireland. Ailladie is one of Ireland's most highly regarded rock-climbing locations, particularly for high technical grade single pitch traditional climbing routes and deep-water soloing routes. It is also a location for shore-angling competitions, and, with its cliffs and view of the Aran Islands, is a popular photography stop for tourists.

== Naming ==
The name Ailladie is an anglicized translation from the Irish language name, Aill an Daill, which means 'The Blind Man's Cliff' or 'Cliff of the Blind Person'. The cliffs are also referred to locally, and by anglers, as Ballyreen Cliffs and Ballyreen Point, which is an anglicised version of the name given to Ailladie's local townland of Irish: Baile Uí Rinn; 'Ó Rinn's homestead'.

== Geography ==
Ailladie is an 800-metre (2,600 ft) long west-facing limestone sea-cliff, varying in height from 8 metres (26 ft) metres to 35 metres (115 ft) metres, that is situated on the coast of The Burren in County Clare, in Ireland. The northernmost sections are not sea-cliffs, and their bases can be accessed by short descent routes (see Access) to flat limestone shelves below. The southernmost sections are all sea-cliffs that can only be accessed by rope abseil. The cliff straddles the Clare townlands of Ballyryan (southern section), and Crumlin (northern section).

=== Access ===
The cliffs of Ailladie are hidden from direct view, and are situated just a short walk from the R477 road, 1.5 kilometres (0.93 mi), at a point before the road turns inland and south-east to Lisdoonvarna. The Ailladie car-park (grid M0901102910), is marked on online maps, and it lies directly opposite the Stone Wall section of the cliffs (see Ailladie map below). Beside the car park, to the southeast, is the smaller rock climbing crag known as Ballyryan (climbers on the Ballyryan crag can be seen by the passing R477 traffic).

Access to the base of the cliff is only possible without abseiling at the northernmost end, where a 3-metre (9.8 ft) roped fisherman's descent gives access to a large limestone platform at the cliff-base of Ailladie.

== Rock climbing ==
=== Reputation ===
Ailladie is a traditional climbing crag, with no bolted or sport climbing routes. With few exceptions, the vast majority of the climbing routes are single pitch 25–35-metre (82–115 ft) long traditional climbs. Where bolts and pitons have appeared, they have generally been removed.

Ailladie has remained at the "cutting edge" of Irish outdoor traditional rock climbing, along with the dolerite cliff of Fair Head in County Antrim. The UKC described Ailladie as "Best coastal limestone in the world! Fact!". The Irish Examiner said, "The mecca for rock climbing in Ireland is Ailladie". The Irish Times called it "one of Ireland's best rock-climbing sites". In 2007, American free solo climber Michael Reardon made the first of several visits to Ailladie and said that it was "redefining everything I know about the mental game of climbing", and that it was "one of my favorite places on the planet".

In 2019, On Reflection (E6 6a), on the Mirror Wall section, was listed in UK Climbing's "The Five Best E6 Routes in the UK and Ireland".

=== Layout ===
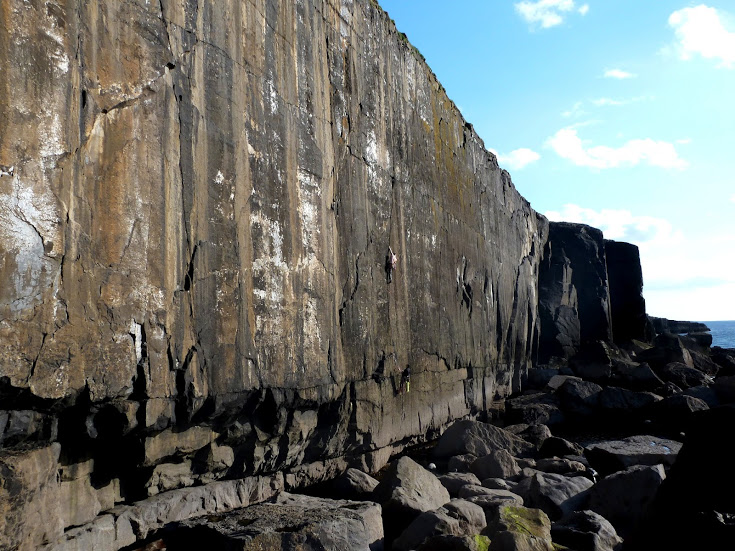
Climbers on The Cutter (E4 6a), using the hanging belay start, on Mirror Wall, Ailladie

Ailladie's northern half includes the sections known to climbers as the Dancing Ledges and the Aran Wall, and sits above a large rock platform that is accessible, via the 3-metre roped fisherman's descent (see Access), regardless of tides. Experienced climbers use a climber's descent at O'Conner's Corner (10-metre, Diff). The Dancing Ledges are the lowest cliffs of Ailladie with routes of 10–15 metres and many below the E-grade, which makes them the most popular section for intermediate climbers; whereas the Aran Wall routes are up to 30-metres in height and mostly E-grade.

The first part of Ailladie's southern-half is Mirror Wall (mostly graded E4–E7), and it is accessible by boulder-hopping at low-tide, although climbers also abseil down to start routes. The remainder of the southern-half of Ailladie, the Stone Wall, An Falla Uaigneach, and Boulder Wall sections, require abseils for access. Many of the climbs in the imposing An Falla Uaigneach sector are started from a hanging belay, and the sector also offers extreme deep water soloing (DWS) routes (e.g. The Jelly Situation 7c+ S1, and King Crozzle, 7b+ S1), and with significant 30-metre (98 ft) drops.

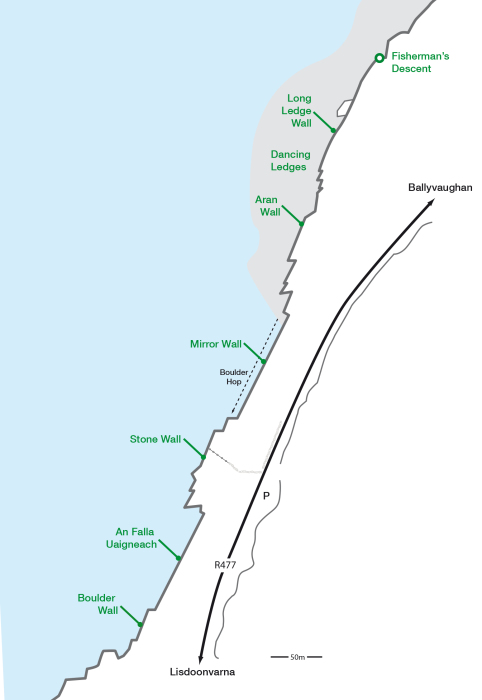
Layout of Ailladie (incl. parking). The grey area at the Fisherman's Descent are the northern limestone ledges used by shore-anglers

The rock is limestone, of a clean blue/grey quality and mostly hanging in a sheer vertical form, with both vertical and horizontal cracks described as reminiscent of granite routes, and texture described as "varies from smooth, in the few small areas recently exposed by rockfall, to a sharp popcorn texture which provides excellent friction". Most climbs follow steep narrow finger-crack lines, and the rock climbing protection is considered to be good. The last guidebook, published in 2008, lists 170 climbs (the current Ailladie online database, see below, has over 200), nearly all single-pitches, with grades up to E7 6c (e.g. Snell's Law, No Reflection, Black Mirror, all at E7 6c and over 35-metres in length). Most Ailladie routes are at, and above, E1 5b grades; there is little quality below VS 4c graded routes, although Ailladie has several classic VS and HVS routes. The lower sections of some routes, and the grade, can change due to the movements of boulders in sea storms, and hence why many Mirror Wall climbers start from a hanging belay.

=== History ===
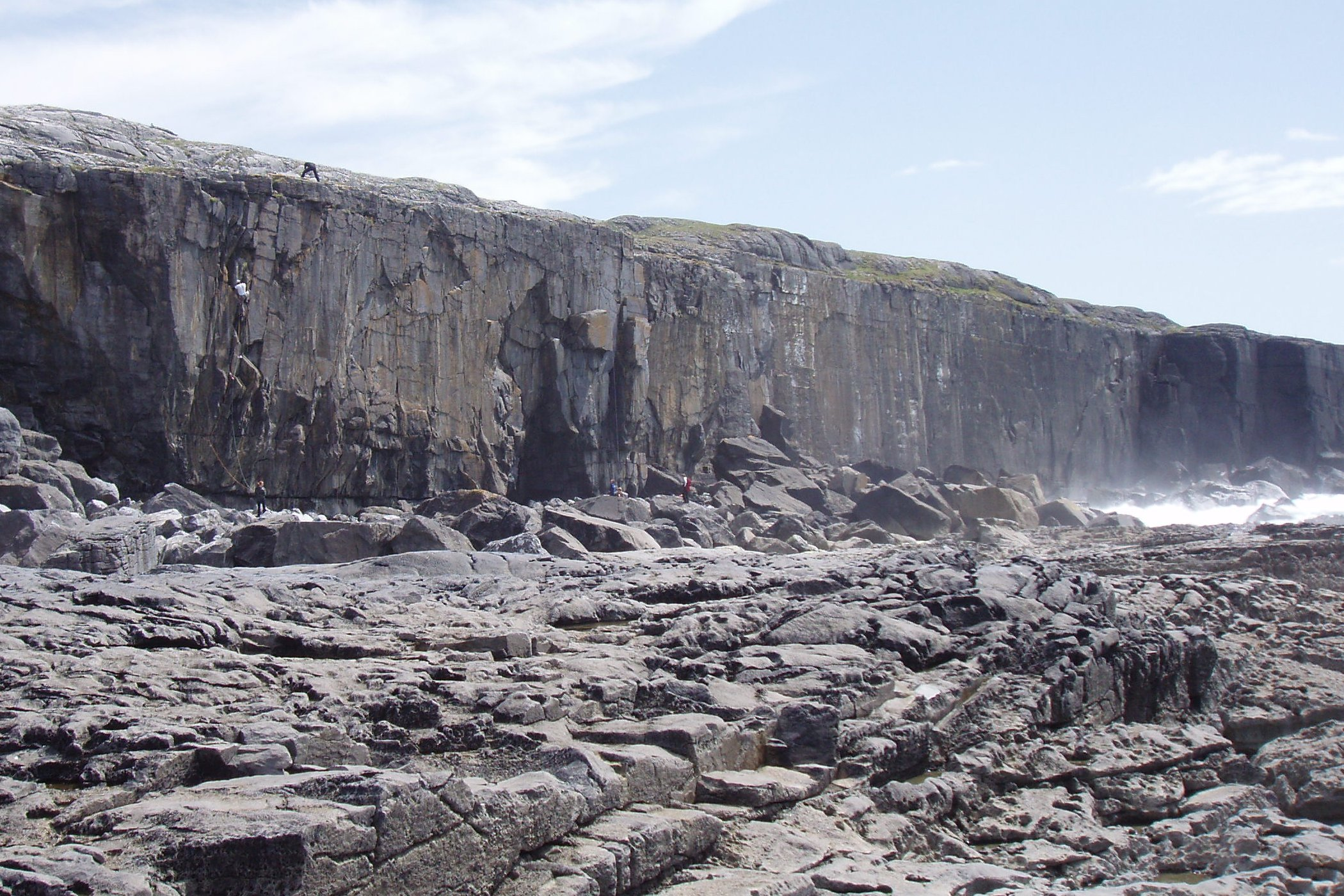
The middle sectors of Ailladie. On the left is the Aran Wall sector (with its distinctive dual square blocks halfway up the wall), with most climbs at E2–E5. To the right is the inset sheer Mirror Wall, with most climbs at E4–E7. The last prominent black corner visible on the right is the classic early Ailladie route, Pis Fliuch (grade HVS/5a, 1972).

The climbing potential of Ailladie was discovered in August 1972, when it was visited by a group of Dublin climbers who would return several times culminating in the November 1972 ascent of one of Ireland's most classic rock climbs, the 30-metre corner of Pis Fluich (HVS 5a) by Jim McKenzie. Word of Ailladie's quality spread, and development also began alongside the smaller nearby crags in The Burren area, which became the only on-shore limestone rock climbing locations in Ireland; the others being mainly granite, sandstone and dolerite. Early pioneers of the crag in the late 1970s included Dermot Somers and Calvin Torrans (The Ramp E1 5b, 5a), but it was with the arrival of Tom Ryan and Keefe Murphy, that many of the crag's most important classics began to appear by the early 1980s, including Skywalker (E3 5c), Kleptomaniac (E3 6a), Through the Looking Glass (E3 6a), and Wall of Fossils (E4 6a). Throughout the 1980s, classic lines were put up by Eddie Cooper including Quicksilver (E5 6a), Damn the Torpedoes (E5 6a), and White Witch (E5 6b), and a visiting British climbing team of Gary Gibson, John Codling and Martin Manson, who added Ice Queen (E5 6a), Refraction (E5 6a), The Cutter (E4 6a), On Reflection (E6 6a), and Prism Sentance (E5 6a, 6b) in a June 1985 visit.

The 1990s saw new harder 3-starred routes such as Welsh climber George Smith's Very Big Springs (E6 6b, 1993), and Seeing Things (E6 6b, with Alan Wainwright, 1993), and Peak District climbers Dominic and Daniel Lee's Phoenix in the Mirror (E6 6c, 1996). The following years saw more E6 and E7 graded routes from some of the leading Irish-based climbers such as Dalkey Quarry regulars Ronan Browner and Herbert Hebblethwaite (Earthling and Forbidden Kink both E6 6c, 1997), and by Ricky Bell (The Happiness that Hurts and The Power of the Hobo both E7 6c, 2006), and Andy Long (The Vein and Forever Young both E7 6c, 2004, and Faith E7 6c, 2005). In addition, Bell, free soloist Julian Lines, and later, Colm Shannon, developed the DWS potential of the An Falla Uaignech section, establishing extreme DWS routes at grades of up to 7c+ S2/3. In 2007, Belgian climber Sean Villanueva O'Driscoll established a new E7 on Mirror Wall that he named Snell's Law (E7 6c), and in 2021, Irish climber Conor McGovern added two further E7s on Mirror Wall, named No Reflection (E7 6c), and Black Mirror (E7 6c).

=== Facilities ===
Visiting climbers either camp in the fields above the crag (however, there is no source of freshwater), or stay at one of the many hostels in the surrounding villages (particularly Doolin for nightlife and additional bouldering, or Fanore for serviced camping grounds). There are several nearby inland 10–20 metres (33–66 ft) high limestone crags with a good range of graded rock climbs, especially in the grades below VS, that are within walking distance (e.g. Ballyryan) or a short driving distance (e.g. Murroughkilly, Aill na Cronain and Oughtdarra), from Ailladie; however, these do not have anything like the quality or popularity of Ailladie.

== Other sports ==
=== Cave diving ===
Starting at circa 9.5 m (31 ft) below sea level, Cliff Cave (also known as Mirror Wall Cave or Pollaillte), extends inland from the crag. It was discovered in 2012, and containing over 2.7 km (1.7 mi) of passages, is the longest-known marine cave in Ireland. Exploration of the cave can only be undertaken after a prolonged period of calm and stable conditions to avoid becoming trapped.

=== Shore angling ===
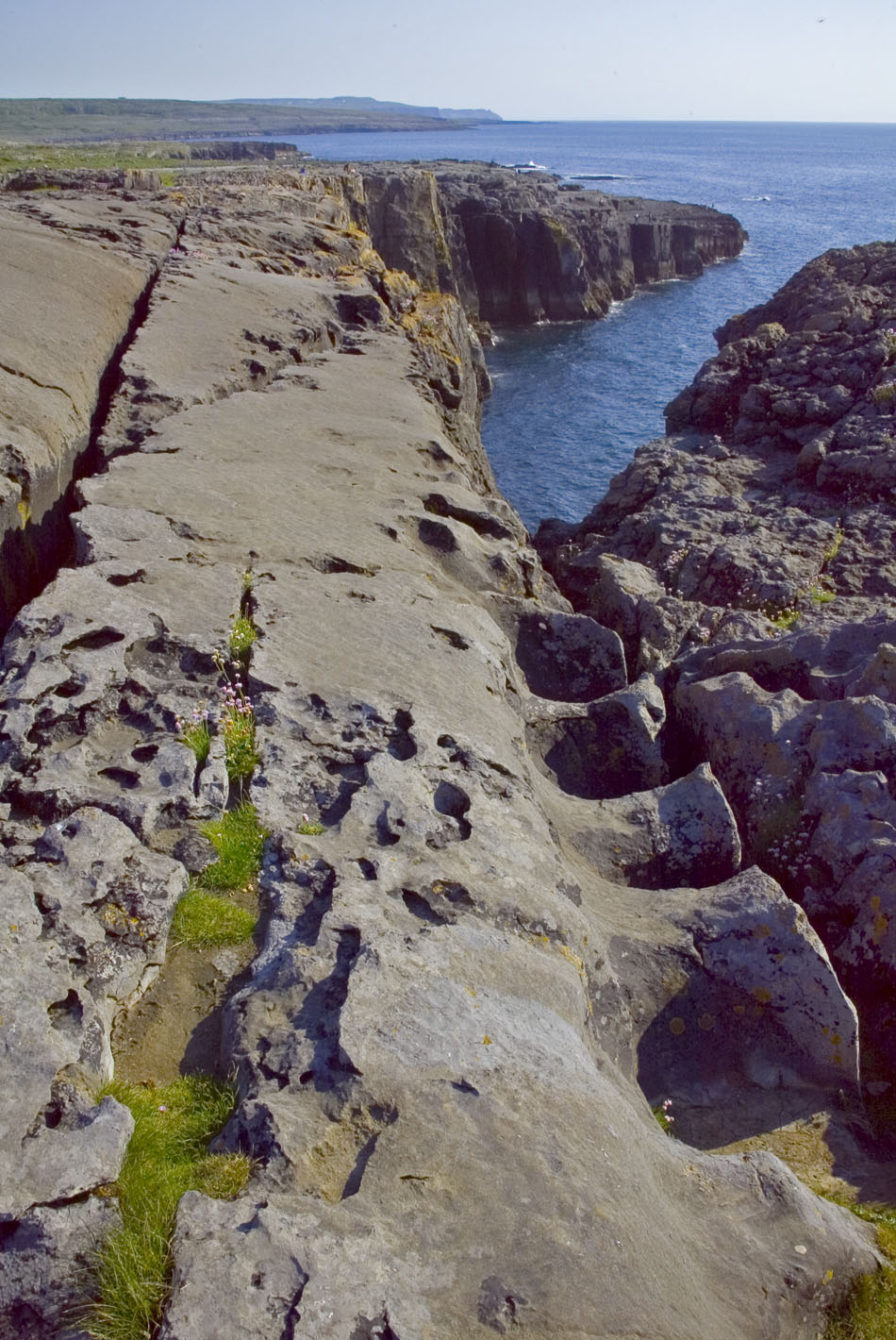
Looking south through a small zawn into Ailladie's Falla Uaigneach cliff-section, with the southerly ledges used for shore-angling.

The limestone ledges at the base of Ailladie's cliffs (at the far north and far south ends), are regarded for their shore-angling and are described as providing "superb bottom fishing". Anglers know the area as Ballyreen-south of Fanore, and several of the rocks have numbers painted on them for shore-angling competitions. Ballyreen is noted as one of the few shore-angling locations in Clare where sharks (porbeagle and blue), and conger eels have been successfully landed.

Because of the proximity of these low limestone ledges to deep Atlantic waters, the ledges have seen several fatalities over the years of anglers who were caught by sudden swells or large waves, and were carried out to sea.

== Accidents ==
As well as accidents from rock-climbing activities (there are no recorded rock climbing fatalities at Ailladie), and accidents and fatalities from shore-angling activities, Ailladie has also seen a number of accidents and fatalities from tourist activities as a result of falls at the cliffs.

== Filmography ==
- Ricky Bell in Ailladie and Fair Head (Antrim): Egner, Jamie (director) (2007). Underdeveloped (Motion picture). Posing Productions.

== See also ==
- Aill na Cronain, inland rock climbing limestone crag in County Clare, right beside the Aillwee Cave
- Ballyryan, inland rock climbing limestone crag in County Clare, right beside Ailladie
- Fair Head, major rock climbing dolerite mountain crag in County Antrim
- Dalkey Quarry, major rock climbing granite quarry in Dublin
- List of long-distance trails in the Republic of Ireland
- List of mountains in Ireland
