= Aillwee Cave =

Cave system in County Clare, Ireland

Aillwee
- McGanns Cave
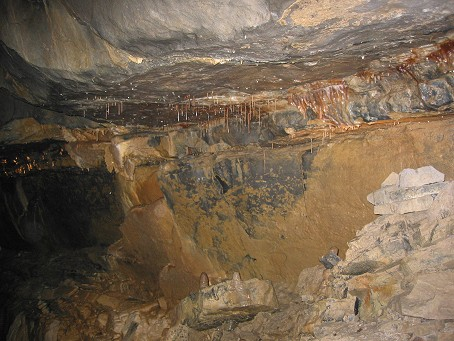
- Inside Aillwee Cave

- Location within Ireland
- Location: County Clare, Ireland
- Coordinates: 53°05′21″N 9°08′38″W
- Length: 1,030 metres (3,380 ft)
- Elevation: 92 metres (302 ft)
- Discovery: 1944. Explored 1973 onwards
- Geology: Carboniferous limestone
- Access: Show cave
- Show cave length: 1,130 metres (3,710 ft) (inc. exit tunnel)
- Lighting: Electric

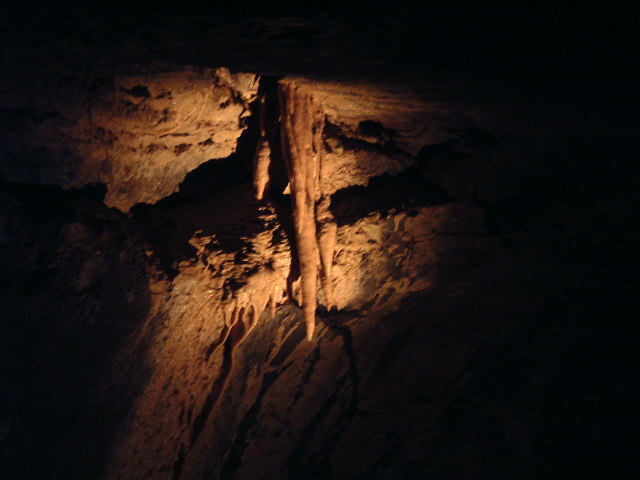
Stalactites seen in the Aillwee caves

Aillwee Cave (Irish: Aill Bhuí) is a cave system in the karst landscape of the Burren in County Clare, Ireland. The name Aillwee is derived from the Irish Aill Bhuí which means "yellow cliff". Privately owned, it forms part of the Aillwee Cave and Birds of Prey Centre attraction.

== Description ==
The cave system consists of over a kilometre of passages leading into the heart of the mountain. Its features include an underground river and a waterfall as well as some large stalactites and stalagmites. The remains of bears can also be seen inside the caves and allusions have been made to it being the last bear den in Ireland. The cave is typical of the Clare caves, consisting in the main of stream passage and ending in a sump. The general direction is east to west but turns due south some 600 metres (2,000 ft) into the cave.

The cave is considerably older than most of the Clare caves and originally contained a large stream. The stream has all but disappeared from the cave and is heavily backfilled with glacial infill. The formations visible on the show cave tour are rarely more than 8,000 years old but calcite samples in the recesses of the cave have been dated to over 350,000 years old.

== Discovery and exploration ==
The cave was discovered in 1944, when a farmer named Jack McGann followed his dog, who was chasing a rabbit. The farmer did not explore very far into the caves, and did not tell anyone of the find for nearly 30 years. He told cavers of the cave in 1973 and that summer the cave was explored as far as a boulder choke. Show cave development began quite soon after.

The boulder choke was removed in 1977 and access was gained to the rest of the cave. The "Marine Blast" tunnel was completed in 1992 to allow a circular trip.

In 1976 the bones of two brown bears were found. These were subsequently determined to be over 10,000 years old. During this period only about 1000 people lived in Ireland.

== Public access ==
The cave was opened to the public in 1976. As of 2018, roughly 300 metres (980 ft) of cave passage is open to the public, one third of the total length of the cave. The tours end at a point called the Highway and exit the cave via a 250-metre (820 ft) man-made tunnel.

The access building has been awarded the Europa Nostra prize. Facilities include a café and gift shop.

== Birds of Prey Centre ==
At the location there is also a Birds of Prey Centre offering shows and "hawk walks".

== In popular culture ==
The caves appear in the Father Ted episode "The Mainland" under the name "The Very Dark Caves". They are also mentioned in a story in Part II of The Basset Chronicles by June J. McInerney.

== Partnerships ==
The cave complex is a member of the local hospitality association, and an active partner of the Burren and Cliffs of Moher Geopark.

== Rock climbing ==
Just 400-meters to the north of the upper car-park of the caves is the popular novice rock climbing location of Aill na Cronain.

== See also ==
- Bears in Ireland
