= Fair Head =

Dolerite mountain cliff, Northern Ireland

- Irish: An Bhinn Mhór The Great Cliff
- Fair Head's distinctive organ pipe dolerite columns, as taken from the Rathlin Island–Ballycastle ferry

- Location within Northern Ireland
- Location: County Antrim, Northern Ireland
- Nearest city: Ballycastle, 3 mi (5 km)
- Coordinates: 55°13′16″N 6°09′14″W
- Type of climbing: Traditional; Abseiling; Bouldering
- Height range: face is over 100 metres (330 ft)
- Pitches range: Single pitch, Multi pitch
- Technical grades: VS to E8 6c; wide variety at all grades above VS; little below VS
- Rock type: Dolerite sill with olivine
- Quantity of routes: 453 routes, online database; 432 routes, 2014 guidebook
- Climbing area developed: Partially developed with scope for further new routes
- Cliff aspect: North and North-west
- Elevation: base is 100 metres (330 ft) a.s.l
- Ownership: Private but access granted
- Camping: Paid camping; also in Ballycastle
- Guidebook: Fair Head Rockclimbing Guidebook (2014)
- Classic climbs: Black Thief (VS 4b); Midnight Cruiser (E1 5b); The Fence (VS 4c); Girona (VS 4c, 4c); Railroad (E1 5b); Hell's Kitchen (HVS 5a, 5a); Burn Up (E1 5a, 5a); An Bealach Runda (E1 5a, 5b, 5a)
- Website: Explore FairHead

Fair Head or Benmore (Irish: An Bhinn Mhór; The Great Cliff) is a five-kilometre-long (three-mile), 200-metre-high (650-foot), mountain cliff, close to the sea, at the north-eastern corner of County Antrim, Northern Ireland. The cliff's sheer and vertical 100-metre-high (350-foot) dolerite rock face is shaped into distinctive vertical columns like organ pipes, which formed 60 million years ago when a sill of igneous rock was injected between horizontal Carboniferous sediments.

Fair Head is considered one of the best traditional climbing and bouldering locations in the British Isles, and is one of the biggest expanses of climbable rock in Northwest Europe. It has one of the largest concentration of extreme-graded routes in the British Isles, and has climbs at E9-grade (e.g. Rathlin Effect), as well as highball problems at E9-grade (e.g. Long runs the Fox), and bouldering at 8B+ (V14) grade (e.g. Blondie SDS).

== Geography ==
The headland of Fair Head rises 200 metres (660 ft) above the sea, and extends for over 5 kilometres (3.1 mi). The dolerite rock face is over 100 metres (330 ft) high in places. Wild goats can be seen roaming among the rocks beneath the clifftops, where a walkway called The Grey Man's Path winds around the rugged coastline. From the road above the cliff, a human-made Iron Age island or crannóg can be seen in the middle of a lake, Lough na Cranagh. The lakes are stocked with trout and can be fished during the summer months. All of the land at Fair Head is private farmland, and not owned by the National Trust (who only have a lease on the land to the east of the headland). Access is by the goodwill of local farm owners. Fair Head is the closest headland to Rathlin Island.

Fair Head's rock formations appear on the 2nd century Ptolemy's map of Ireland from Ptolemy's Geography, described as a point called Ῥοβόγδιον (Rhobogdiun) (cf the Robogdii tribe), which academics believe is Fair Head. The name may derive from the Proto-Celtic root *bogd, "bend".

Fair Head (and the neighboring Murlough Bay) are classed as an area of special scientific interest (ASSI), and are on the register of Antrim ASSI.

== Geology ==
Fair Head is a sill of Palaeogene age that is the thickest and most extensive of the various sills from the plateau lavas of northeast Ireland. A sill is a tabular body of what was once molten rock that was injected into horizontal rocks (usually well-bedded sedimentary strata). Fair Head's sill is 85 metres (279 ft) thick at its maximum, and consists of columnar-jointed dolerite rock (a medium-grained igneous rock compositionally equivalent to finer-grained basalt) showing crystals of olivine, that intruded into Carboniferous sediments in the north of the outcrop circa 60 million years ago. At the north end of Murlough Bay, a substantial sill (the Binnagapple sill) appears below the main Fair Head sill, separated by 85 metres (279 ft) of Carboniferous shales.

Despite the thickness, the heat from the Fair Head sill did not alter the underlying Triassic sandstone, however, shales have been converted to hornfels extending up to 5 metres (16 ft) from the contact. The distinctive columnar jointing of the dolerite rock is the result of stresses caused by the cooling and solidifying of the melt, and there are minor crush zones associated with later compression. Although the cliff face is stable, weathering has periodically toppled some columns producing blocks of massive dimensions on the scree below. Geologists record that even major storms barely disturb these blocks (e.g. unlike the limestone blocks at Ailladie in Clare), and thus the scree may be little changed since the late-glacial period.

== Rock climbing ==
=== Reputation and ethics ===
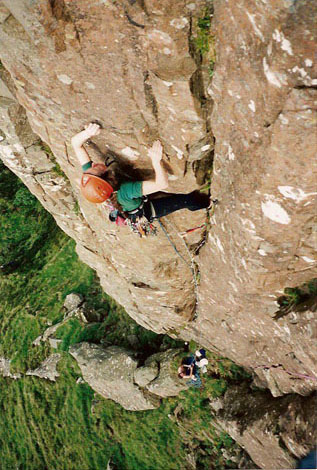
The single-pitch Fireball (E1 5b) on The Prow

The 2014 Fair Head guidebook, its 6th edition, lists over 430 routes mostly from grade VS 4b up to E6 6b, and the current climbing databases list over 445 routes at grades up to E9 6c. Fair Head is not regarded as an ideal crag for novice climbers, and the long nature of the routes (averaging over 50 metres, with many up to 100 metres), the requirement for long and intimidating abseils for access in many areas, and the high concentration of E-grade climbs, means that it is ideally a crag for intermediate and even more for expert-level climbers. There have been fatalities at the crag. An annual Fair Head Climbing Meet is held over the first weekend of June for all climbers.

The cliffs abound in well-protected steep crack climbing, between one and four pitches in length, with routes that range from under 20 metres (66 ft) to over 100 metres (330 ft). Many of the cracks involve hand-jamming (and even full-body jamming), and some climbers tape their hands to protect the skin from the "Fair Head rash". Some routes involve off-width or full-width chimneying, which is not often encountered in other Irish crags. As with all Irish crags, Fair Head is a traditional climbing area with no bolted or sport climbing routes allowed; the Mountaineering Ireland guidebook states that any newly placed manufactured bolts will be removed.

Fair Head is considered one of the best climbing venues in the British Isles, and is compared to Stanage for the scale of routes, particularly at E-grade. Fair Head is noted for the variation in its climbing sections from the westerly-facing sea-cliff walls like the Rathlin Wall, to the cold dark mountain-like north faces of White Lightning Amphitheatre and Grey Man's Path, which have been compared to Clogwyn Du'r Arddu. Climbing author David Flanagan called it "the jewel in the crown of Irish climbing". Climbing ranked Above and Beyond (E6 6b) in its top-5 E6-grade climbs, and Born to Run E4 (6a, 5c, 5c) in its top-5 E4-grade climbs, in the Brish Isles.

=== Layout ===
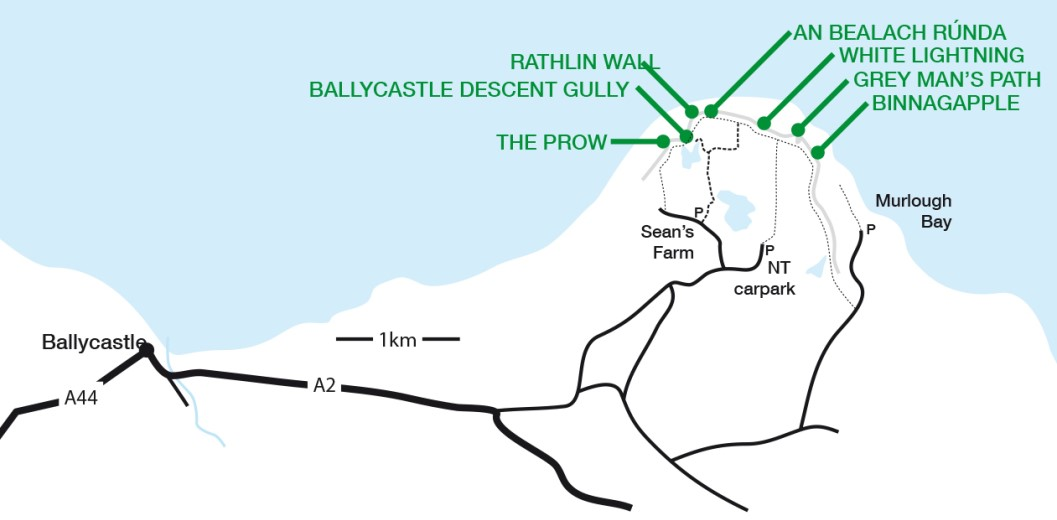
Layout of main Fair Head sections

Fair Head is one of the largest rock climbing crags in the British Isles, stretching to over 5-kilometers. The individual sections can have a very different feel and character, ranging from dry westerly faces to cold dark northerly faces. The main sectors (and subsectors) are (east to west):

- Small Crag is a 10–20m high sector with almost 70 climbs, most of which are at VS to HVS grade, which stretches for 1-kilometre above a forested hillside; the difficulty of access means that abseiling in is recommended. Together with infestations of midges, this makes the sector unpopular, in spite of the quality of climbing. Further east is the small The Middle Crag with a handful of 20–25m E1 climbs accessed by abseil from in-situ stakes.

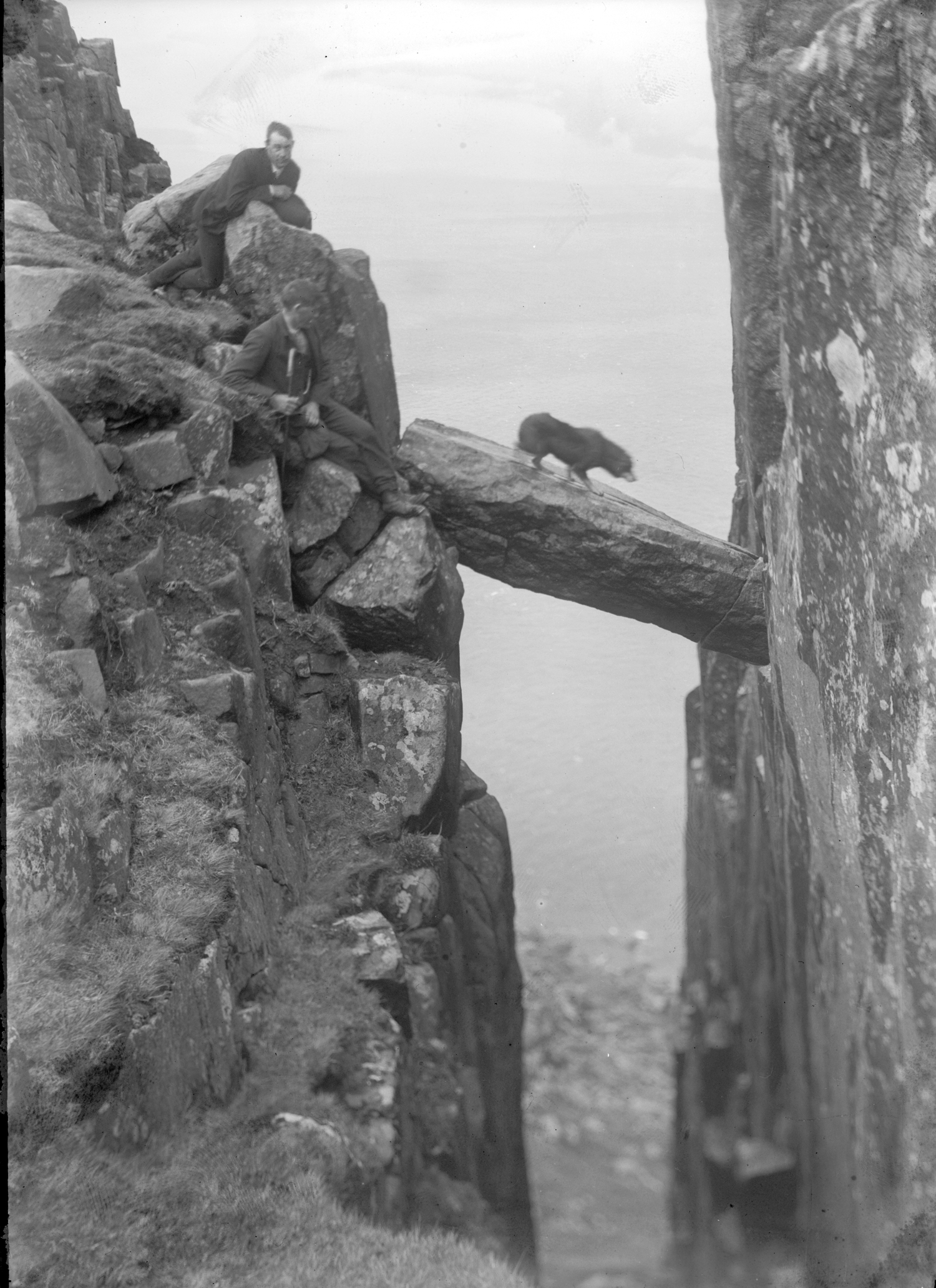
The collapsed column across the Grey Man's Path Gully has always been a tourist attraction

- Main Crag is 3-kilometers long, 100m tall, with several sub-sections (see below). While many routes are accessed by long abseil (up to 100m), there are two descent gullies at either end, but 3-kilometres apart, the "Grey Man's Path Gully" (east end) and "Ballycastle Descent Gully" (west end).

- Binnagapple Area has 30 routes on clean lichen-free rock (as it absorbs the early-morning sun) but is less frequented as most routes are graded E2 to E4, and it requires a long abseil for access; it has some of the best-regarded multi-pitch E-grade routes, Toby Jug (E1 5a, 5b), Hurricane (E2 5b, 5b), and Sandpiper (E2 5c, 5a), and extremes like Track of the Cat (E4 6a) and The Dark Side (E8 6c).
- Grey Man's Path has almost 30 routes but is less popular, despite its easier access via the gully, as the cliff is windy and the rock slow to dry; the section is noted for Burn Up (HVS 5a, 5a), described as the "hall of fame HVS of the crag" and which has a dramatic "throne belay".
- White Lightning Amphitheatre is a vast open bay usually accessed via an 85m abseil, with over 20 routes mostly graded E3 to E4, including Born to Run E4 (6a, 5c, 5c), described as "one of the best routes in Ireland", and ranked in the "5 Best E4-graded routes in the UK".
- An Bealach Rúnda area (including Terraces) is over 30 routes, some requiring body-jamming and multi-pitch route finding, accessed via a 90m abseil down An Goban Saor; An Bealach Rúnda (E1 5a, 5b, 5a) is one of the most popular climbs in Fair Head, with Blockbuster (E2 5c, 4c, 5b) well regarded, however, most other routes are above the E3-grade, with An Bealach Eile at E8 6c.

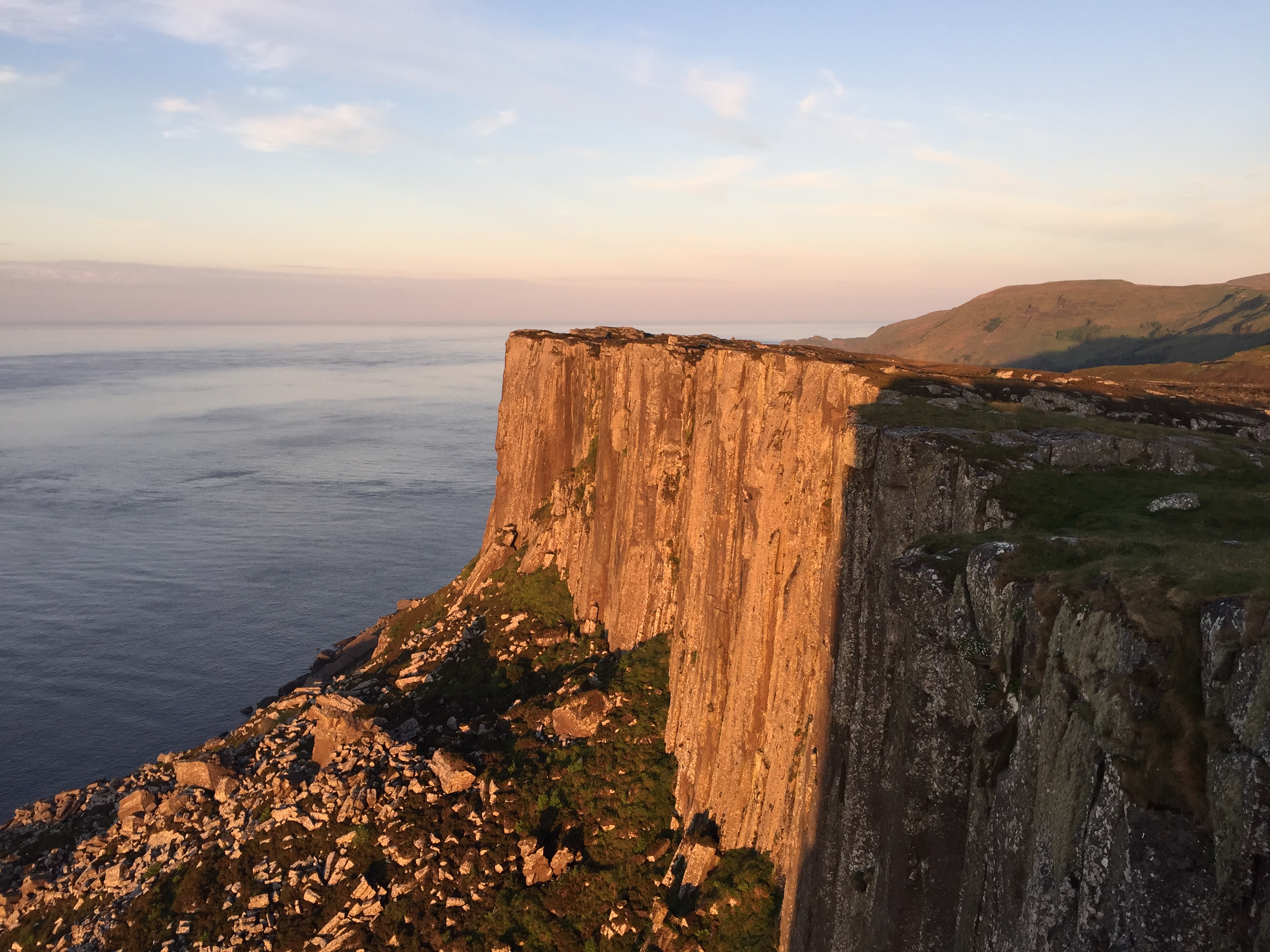
Evening sun on the westerly Rathlin Wall, where Fair Head's most extreme routes are located, including Complete Scream (E8 6b) and The Big Skin (E8 6c)

- Rathlin Wall is a 40–100m high west-facing wall with easy access to over 35 single and multi-pitch extreme climbs that include some of the best-regarded E2 (e.g. Equinox, Blind Phew, Mizen Star) to E4 (Face Value) and E5 (The Mask) graded climbs in Fair Head, as well as some of the most extreme climbs at Fair Head including Complete Scream (E8 6b), and The Big Skin (E8 6c).
- Wall of Prey is a wall between Rathlin Wall and Hell's Kitchen that contains over 10 climbs the easiest of which is Wall of Prey (E5 6b), and which includes Above and Beyond (E6 6b), ranked in the "5 Best E6-graded climbs in the UK", Below and Behold (E7 6c), and Rathlin Effect (E9 6c), the crag's first E9. (Note: Rathlin Effect was originally graded E8 6c by its first ascensionist, Ricky Bell, however British climber James Mchaffie who made the second ascent at the 2018 Fair Head Meet confirmed it as E9 6c.)
- Ballycastle Descent Gully (East & West) is one of the most popular areas after The Prow given the ease of access, westerly aspect, and quality VS and HVS options, with Aoife (VS 4b, 4b), Girona (VS 4c, 4c), and Hell's Kitchen (HVS 5a, 5a), some of the most popular climbs in Fair Head.
- The Prow is the most popular climbing section in Fair Head – and particularly for first-time visitors to dolerite crack and corner climbing routes – with over 40 easily accessible and mostly west-facing routes that are generally linear single-pitch crack climbs of 20–60m in length, and which include several of Fair Head's best-regarded climbs in the VS (e.g. The Black Thief, The Fence) and E1 (Midnight Cruiser, Railroad and Fireball) range.
- Farrangandoo crag is an amphitheatre-shaped sector that has over 30 routes covering a range of lengths (mostly 25–45m) and grades (from VS to E2), with Pangur Ban (HVS 5a), and Crib Pad Crack (E1 5b) (including the E3 6a Crib Direct), being the most popular routes.
- Marconi's Cove is a small crag about 500m away that gets a lot of afternoon sun, and contains about 30 shorter (by Fair Head standards) 20–25m single-pitch climbs from VS to E3, on more open face climbing, with Soundman (E3 5c) and Distant Voices (E3 5c) being the most regarded.

=== Access ===
Fair Head crag is on private property and is part of the McBride family farm, a working farm the McBride family has operated for over three centuries, but access is given. The eastern side of Murlough Bay is part of the National Trust. The McBride's "Sean's Farm" car park is near to the Ballycastle Descent Gully area, while the "National Trust" car park is closer to the Grey Man's Path Gully. From either car park, it takes about 15 minutes to reach the top of the crag. Fair Head's eastern end (the Small Crag, and the Murlough Bay bouldering area) can be approached from the Murlough Bay car park.

The two main descent options to the base of the crag by foot are the popular Ballycastle Descent Gully, and the less popular Grey Man's Path Gully. Walking along the base of the Fair Head crag for any distance is not recommended as the terrain makes it time-consuming and very unpleasant, and therefore for routes in the middle of the crag that are far from the two descent gullies, a 100m abseil rope is advised (with a knot tied at the end of it for safety); several of the main routes have large boulders or metal stakes as abseil points. Climbers can stay at the crag in "Sean's Farm", where the McBride family offer basic temporary camping and some lodging facilities (including a camping barn) for a fee, while more extensive accommodation, including a hostel, can be found in nearby Ballycastle.

=== Climbing history ===
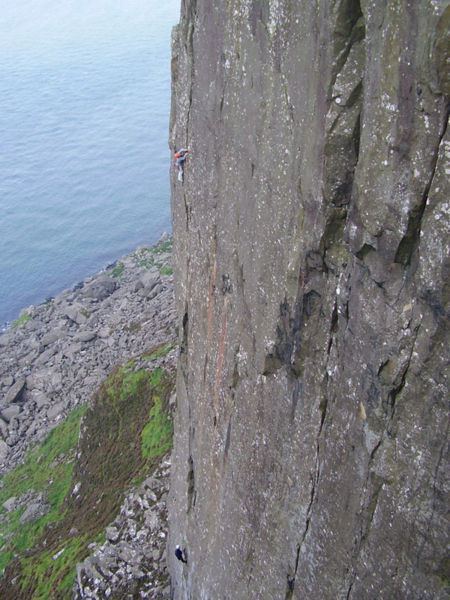
Climbers on the second pitch of Jolly Roger (E3 6a), Binnagapple Area

The first climbs at Fair Head were done in the mid-1960s by Belfast-based climbers and members of the Dublin-based Spillikin Club. Most of these climbs followed loose and dirty chimneys and are rarely repeated today, however, by the end of the sixties development of the crag had started in earnest. Development slowed during the height of the troubles in the early 1970s, but development picked up again in the late seventies, led by the husband-and-wife team of Calvin Torrans and Clare Sheridan, and a number of other Dublin climbers. This small band devoted themselves to developing Fair Head, founded the Dal Riada Climbing Club (named after the ancient kingdom which included this area), and acquired a climbing hut nearby to accommodate themselves and other visiting climbers.

== Bouldering ==
Fair Head also contains over 511 bouldering problems, with a concentration in the boulder fields that have accumulated in Murlough Bay area (east side of the crag) and at the base of the Ballycastle Descent area (west side). These dolerite boulders have fallen off the cliffs above and the general required style is described as "steep, crimpy and powerful", with a caution that excess bouldering mats are needed to handle the poor landing areas due to the density of the strewn boulder fields. Rob Hunter, with his wife Veronica, is credited with developing the venue, and their 2012 guidebook listed over 450 routes from grade 3 to 8A+ (V12).

In 2020, Hunter created the first 8B+ (V14) route by adding a sit-down-start (SDS) to Dan Varian's problem, Blondie. Classic extreme problems include Varian's Blondie 8B (V13) and Glen Ross 8A+ (V12), which Varian describes as one of his best-ever climbing moments. and also Ricky Bell's Gentleman's Arete 8B (V13), and Spindle SDS 8A (V11) on the distinctive Hanging Rock boulder. Extreme highball bouldering problems include The Big Black (E7 6c), and Ricky Bell's 2015 free solo of the boulder slab Long Runs the Fox (E9 6c) in the Murlough Bay.

In 2012, Irish climbing author David Flanagan, ranked Fair Head as one of the best bouldering locations in Ireland, just behind Glendalough in Wicklow. In a 2017 video review for Rock & Ice magazine, British boulder Dan Turner called it one of the best locations in the British Isles, and "Britain's answer to Magic Wood in Switzerland".

== In popular culture ==
Fair Head is used as a location in Season 7 of Game of Thrones, in Episode 3 "The Queen's Justice", and Episode 5 "Eastwatch".

== Filmography ==
- Ricky Bell and others in Ailladie (Clare) and Fair Head (Antrim): Egner, Jamie (director) (2007). Underdeveloped (Motion picture). Posing Productions.
- Ricky Bell on Below and Behold (E7 6c) on Rathlin Wall: Lee, Alistair (director) (2008). Onsight (Motion picture). Posing Productions.

== See also ==
- Ailladie, major rock climbing limestone sea-cliff in County Clare
- Dalkey Quarry, major rock climbing granite quarry in Dublin
