= Dalkey Quarry =

Dublin's largest rock climbing venue

Dalkey quarry
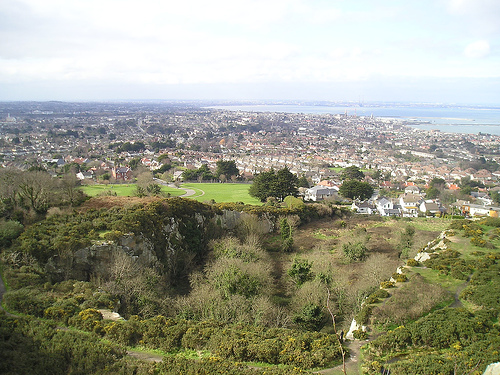
- Dalkey quarry, looking north and down into the West Valley, from the top of the Upper Cliffs

- Location within Dublin
- Location: Dalkey Hill, Dalkey, County Dublin
- Nearest city: Dublin City
- Coordinates: 53.2711°N 6.1069°W
- Type of climbing: Traditional; Abseiling; Bouldering
- Height range: circa 40 metres (130 ft) at highest
- Pitches range: Mostly single pitch
- Technical grades: Diff to E8 6c (wide variety)
- Rock type: Granite
- Quantity of routes: +350 routes (online database)
- Climbing area developed: Well developed but does have new route opportunity
- Cliff aspect: Multiple aspects
- Elevation: 82 metres (269 ft) a.s.l
- Ownership: Public park
- Camping: Camping is not allowed
- Guidebook: Dalkey Quarry (2022)
- Classic climbs: Central Buttress (E1 4a,5b,4b); Gargoyle Groove (HVS 5b); Graham Crackers (HVS 5a); Jameson 10 (VS 4b); Paradise Lost (VD); Pilaster (VS 4c); Port Cullis (E4 6a); The Ghost (E2 5b); The Prisoner (E5 6a); The Shield (E2 5c); Thrust (HVS 5a)
- Website: Climbing.ie Dalkey Quarry

Dalkey quarry (/ˈdɔːki/ DAW-kee) is a long-disused 19th century granite quarry located on Dalkey Hill in the Dublin suburb of Dalkey, which was used to build several large maritime structures in south Dublin. Since passing into public ownership in the early 20th century and becoming part of Killiney Hill Park, it has become one of the most important rock climbing venues in Ireland, with over 350 graded routes, some of which are amongst the hardest single-pitch rock climbs in the country such as Indecent Assault (E8 6c, one of Ireland's first-ever E8 routes, first ascended in 1995). The climbs are all traditional climbing routes and no bolted sport climbing routes are permitted, although some metal pegs are tolerated on the most extreme routes.

== History ==
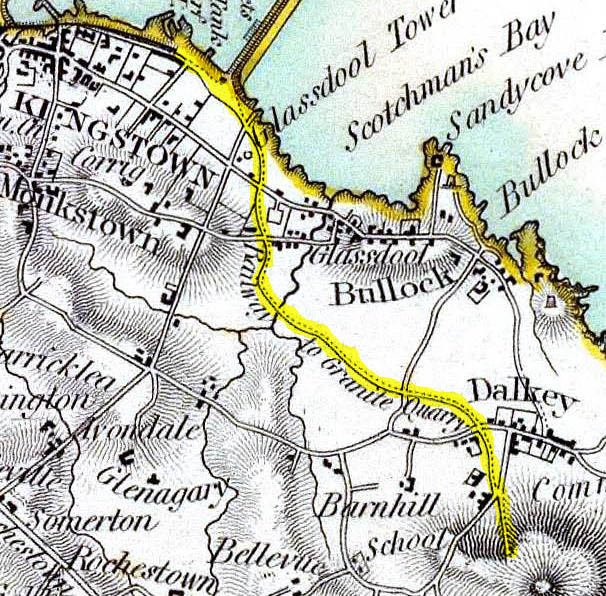
Route of quarry railway, 1837

Quarrying started in 1815–1817 on Dalkey Hill in order to supply granite for the construction of the new harbour pier at nearby Dún Laoghaire, as well as for the construction of the South Bull Wall (part of the outer defences of Dublin Harbour) and as flagstone for Dublin streets. Dalkey granite is known for its hardness when compared to other granites, being "as hard as iron" according to Jim Murphy, a Dublin stonecutter interviewed in 1976. According to engineer John Hussey, Dalkey granite is an "engineering granite", suitable for the construction of harbours, breakwaters, lighthouses and slipways. Dalkey and Killiney quarries supplied the stone for many of these types of engineering projects in the Dublin area, and owing to their proximity to the sea, the stone easy to transport by ship.

In the 1840s, stone from the quarry was exported to Newfoundland by Bishop Michael Fleming for the construction of the Basilica of St. John the Baptist in St. John's. In the 1860s, a two-ton foundation stone of Dalkey granite was used for the base of the O'Connell Monument in Dublin.

The quarry was connected to Dún Laoghaire by a light railway, part of whose alignment was later used to build the Dalkey Atmospheric Railway. The remaining part of the route is now a public footpath known as The Metals, and much of the original granite paving survives. A number of the houses on nearby Ardbrugh Road may have been originally built as quarry staff cottages, though most quarrymen originally squatted or lived in primitive tents. The quarry was the scene of major industrial action in the 1820s as quarry workers, who then numbered over 1,000 with their families, looked for better pay and conditions.

After the construction of the harbour, quarrying only continued sporadically thereafter before finally ending in 1917. In 1914, the quarry was taken over by what is now known as Dún Laoghaire–Rathdown County Council (DLRCC), and most of the land was added to the existing Killiney Hill Park thus opening it up to the general public. In 1998, the DLRCC drew up proposals to turn the quarry's West Valley into a caravan halting site for travellers. The move met with opposition from local residents, climbers, and environmentalists, and the plans were eventually dropped. In May 2010, DLRCC angered climbers when they removed several large boulders from the quarry, disrupting climbing routes and potentially damaging other climbing routes in the process.

== Rock climbing ==
=== Layout and access ===
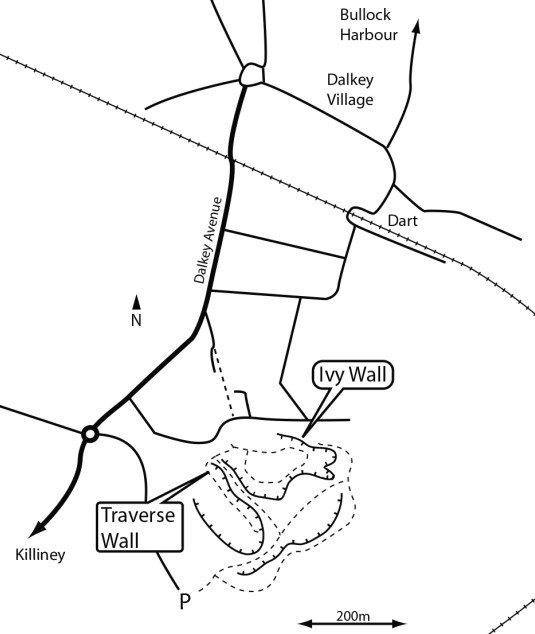
Layout and access of Dalkey Quarry, showing the East Valley, West Valley, and Upper Cliffs area.

There are three main climbing sections, the "Upper Cliffs", the "West Valley", and the "East Valley". Access to the West and East Valley sections is via the main entrance on Ardbrugh Road (just off Dalkey Avenue). Beside the East Valley section is a "Far East Valley" section, however, it is on private property and closed to climbing. The East Valley section splits into the three sub-sections, "Ivy Chimney", "Eliminate Wall", and "Ghost Slab". The West Valley section splits into four sub-sections, "Pilaster", "Paradise Lost Slab", "Winder's Slab", and "Jameson 10 Wall".

Directly above the East and West valleys is the Upper Cliffs. It can be accessed by the broad ridge that separates the East and West valleys (along which the quarry railway ran), or via a tarmac path from the Killiney Hill car-park, that passes an old signalling tower (British military tower to signal neighbouring Martello towers), dropping steeply via a set of concrete steps to the base of the Upper Cliffs. The Upper Cliffs splits into three sub-sections, "Central Buttress" (overlooks the East Valley), "Tower Ridge" (between the two valleys), and the "White Wall" (overlooks the West Valley).

Apart from the concrete steps down from the signalling tower to the Upper Cliffs section, the quarry is not landscaped and is left wild with extensive gorse and bramble growth, and thus no longer resembles a typical industrial quarry. The vegetation is home to wildlife, including foxes, and since 2014, peregrine falcons have sometimes nested in the Upper Cliffs section; climbing in the vicinity of the nests is banned during the nesting periods.

=== Routes and ethics ===
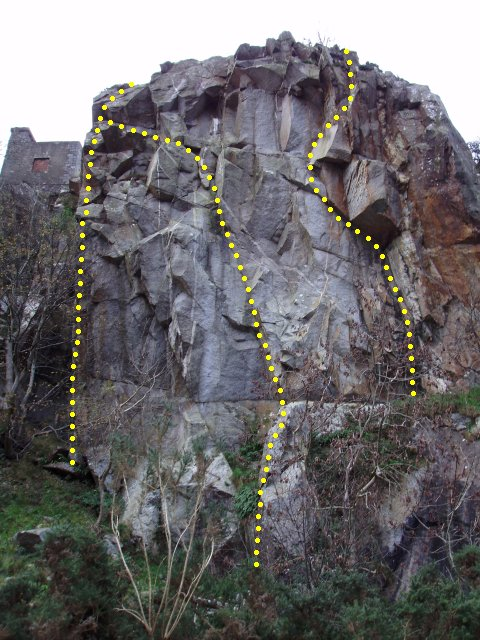
Central Buttress on the Upper Cliffs, home to the quarry's longest routes and some of the hardest. Lines from left to right: Slapstick (E7 6b), Central Buttress (E1 5b), Port Cullis (E4 6a). Signalling tower is top left.

Routes are mainly single-pitch routes (there are some multi-pitch routes), and between 10–35 metres (33–115 ft) in length. The rock is granite and strongly jointed which means the rock is some parts is very solid whilst in other areas it is frail and friable. Routes vary in nature, with steep finger-cracks and bare slabs featuring prominently. Being granite (with some bands of quartz), the climbing friction is good, but being quarried, it is not as good as fully weathered natural granite.

The latest guidebook, published in 2005, lists about 300 routes, at grades up to E7, while the online guidebook contains over 350 routes with grades to E8 6c (e.g. Indecent Assault now regraded to E8). The number and density of routes in Dalkey Quarry is high given the size of the quarry (e.g. Fair Head's 5 km long cliff has circa 450 routes, and Ailladie's 1 km-long cliff has circa 200 routes), however, its popularity is due to its position as the most accessible outdoor rock climbing area for Dublin.

Dalkey Quarry is a traditional climbing area with no bolted sport climbing routes, and the Mountaineering Ireland guidebook states that any newly placed manufactured bolts will be removed promptly. The availability of climbing protection varies but is generally considered good, and while some old pitons still remain (they are rarely replaced when they break), they should be treated with caution. Extreme climbers have used metal pegs hammered into existing cracks to reduce the risk on routes with almost no natural protection (e.g. Indecent Assault and Bitter Aftertaste), which are tolerated and remain in place.

=== Climbing history ===
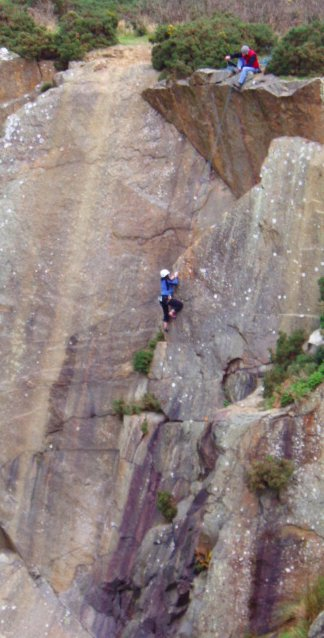
Climbers on Gargoyle Groove (HVS 5b, 1957), in the West Valley

In 1942, the quarry's first recorded climbs were made by members of the Irish Mountaineering Club (IMC), and a handwritten guidebook of thirteen routes was published that included Fifth Avenue (HS 4b), and Gwynne's Chimney (VS 4c). These routes were the first steps in the development of rock climbing in Ireland. The publication of the second IMC guidebook in 1949 saw many of the more obvious features climbed in the quarry. A new group of climbers pushed standards in the 1950s, with Fed Maguire, John Morrison, and Peter Kenny's 1951 ascent of Central Buttress (E1 4a, 5b, 4b), considered a milestone, and Kenny's 1951 ascents of Helios and Hyperion (both VS 4b), and Andre Kopczynski's 1952 ascent of In Abenstia (HVS 5a). In 1957, Paddy O'Leary put up Gargoyle Groove (HVS 5b).

By 1964, Barry O'Flynn's fourth guidebook had 71 climbs which included more classic VS and HVS climbs from Maguire, Kopczynski, and others. The 1970s saw grades pushed even higher and particularly with the arrival of the Windrim brothers (Sean and Donal), with Sean putting up major classics such as Blazing Saddles (E2 5c) and The Ghost (E2 5b) in 1976, and The Shield (E2 5c) in 1978, described by the guidebook as "probably the most fallen off route in the quarry". The 1980s saw the arrival of a new generation that included Tony Burke (described in the MCI guidebook as "The Quarry Guru") who added Porn for Fun (E5 6a) and Hari Kari Groove (E3 5c) in 1985, and Howard Hebblethwaite (often climbing partner of Burke) who added Port Cullis (E4 6a) and Solitary Confinement (E5 6b) in 1985.

1990 saw a burst of new extremes including Donie O'Sullivan adding Ripsnorter (E5 6a), Asterisk (E6 6b), and doing Prisoner (E5 6a) without the peg runner to free what the guidebook calls "one of the best routes in the quarry"; Burke added Return of the Jedi (E5 6b). The mid-1990s saw the dominance of Ronan Browner in driving standards in the quarry, however, his attempts to introduce bolted climbs led to a showdown at the 1994 IMC AGM and a decision to ban bolts from all traditional Irish crags, of which Dalkey was one. In 1994, Browner instead used homemade pegs on his re-named Bitter Aftertaste (E6 6a, previously The Great Escape at F7a), and a year later on Indecent Assault (E7 6c, previously F7b+), the first E7 at the quarry, later considered E8 (one of Ireland's first). In 1999, Browner added a second E7 to Dalkey with Slapstick (E7 6c).

Browner continued to put up extreme new routes in the quarry. In 2000, he added a direct finish to Burke's 1994 classic Chomolungma (E6 6b), the Sans O2 Finish (E6 6c), In 2004, he added the classic Alexandria (E6 6b), and in the same year partnered with Hebblethwaite to add Lush (E7 6c), the third E7 in the quarry. Other long-standing problems were solved and gaps filled including Block Party (E7 6c) soloed in 2009 by Michael Duffy, and Captain Skyhook (E6 6b) in 2012 by Stephen McGowan. In 2020, Conor McGovern added a second E8 with his ascent of Blackberry Nightmare (E8 6c) in the East Valley beside Alexandria.

=== Prohibition on climbing ===
In August 2025 Dún Laoghaire–Rathdown County Council erected "No climbing" signs and announced that it "has prohibited rock climbing activities at Dalkey Quarry, effective immediately". The council also said "This decision has been taken as a precautionary measure pending the completion of a comprehensive safety assessment at the site".

Liam Feely, CEO of Mountaineering Ireland, said he didn't know what had caused the councils' decision. He also said that Mountaineering Ireland is working with the council, that changes in liability legislation reduced owners liability and that he hoped MI would resolve the issue with the council before the end of the month.

On 2 October 2025 Mountaineering Ireland announced that the ban on climbing had been effectively lifted.

== Bouldering ==
While not noted for its bouldering routes, the quarry does have two areas, the "Ivy Chimney" section in the East Valley being the most popular area due to its ability to stay dry in damp conditions (its popularity dates from the pre-indoor climbing wall period), and the "Traverse Wall" in the West Valley that contains long and low warm-up routes. The problems are not boulders per se, but the start of traditional climbing routes, and low traverses across various walls.

Boulder grades range from 3 to 7B+ (V8) (Ricky Bell's Super Pitch Shifter in the East Valley). In addition, several shorter traditional climbs are now ascended as highball bouldering problems with bouldering mats, popular candidates being Pilaster (VS 4c, 15m), Solitary Confinement (E5 6b, 14m), and Block Party (E7 6c, 7B (V8), 9m).

== See also ==
- Ailladie, major rock climbing limestone sea-cliff in County Clare
- Fair Head, major rock climbing dolerite mountain crag in County Antrim
- Irish Mountaineering Club

== Gallery ==
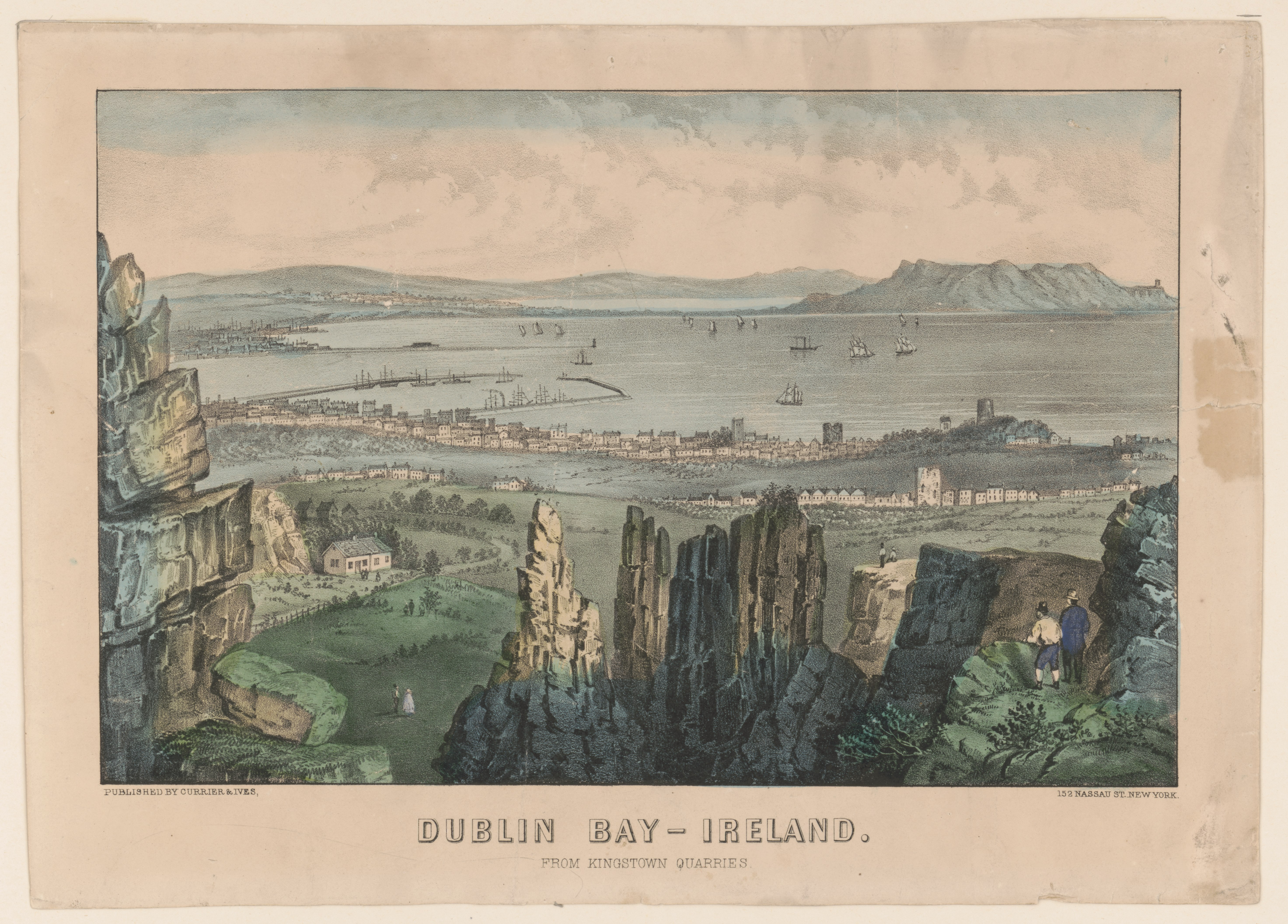
Dublin Bay from "Kingstown Quarries" aka Dalkey quarry (circa 1856-1907)

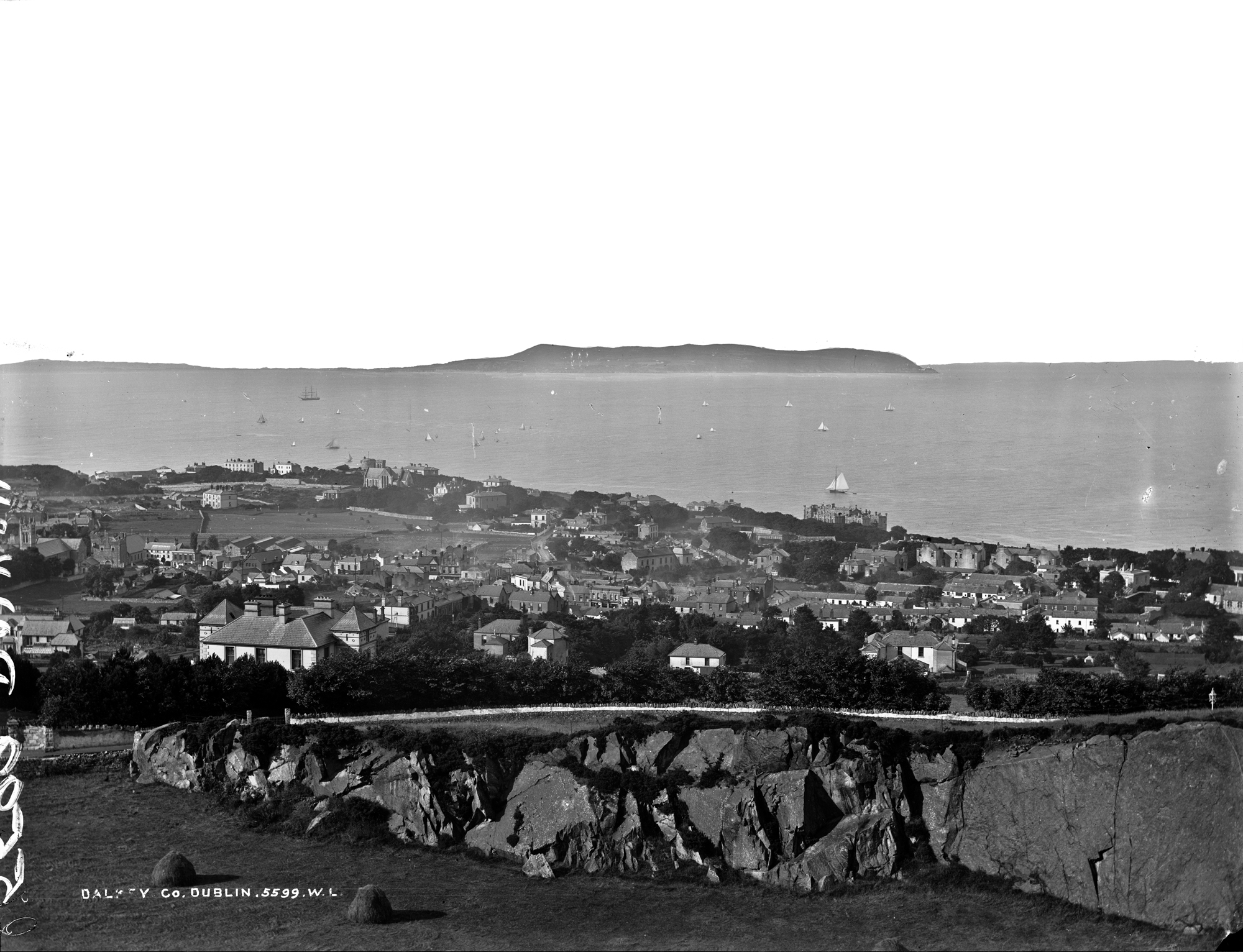
A view from Dalkey quarry photographed by Robert French (c. 1890s)
