= Fanore =

Village in The Burren, Clare, Ireland

Fanore Fánóir
- Village
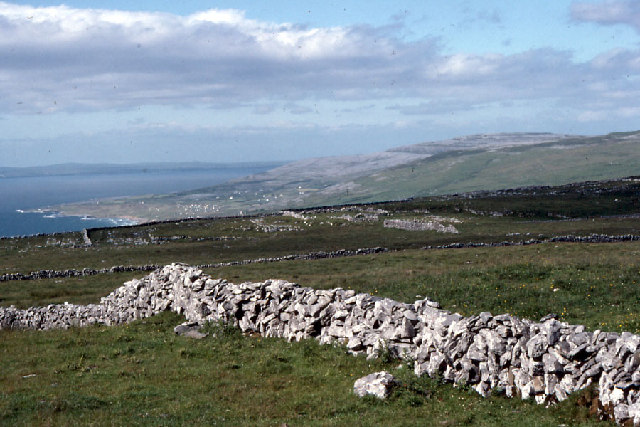

- Location in Ireland
- Coordinates: 53°07′N 09°17′W
- Country: Ireland
- Province: Munster
- County: County Clare
- Elevation: 20 m (66 ft)
- Time zone: UTC+0 (WET)
  - Summer (DST): UTC-1 (IST (WEST))
- Irish Grid Reference: R066965

Fanore (Irish: Fánóir, Fán Óir, meaning 'the golden slope') is a small village in the Killonaghan civil parish of County Clare, on the west coast of Ireland. The area was officially classified as part of the West Clare Gaeltacht, an Irish-speaking community, until 1956.

== Geography ==
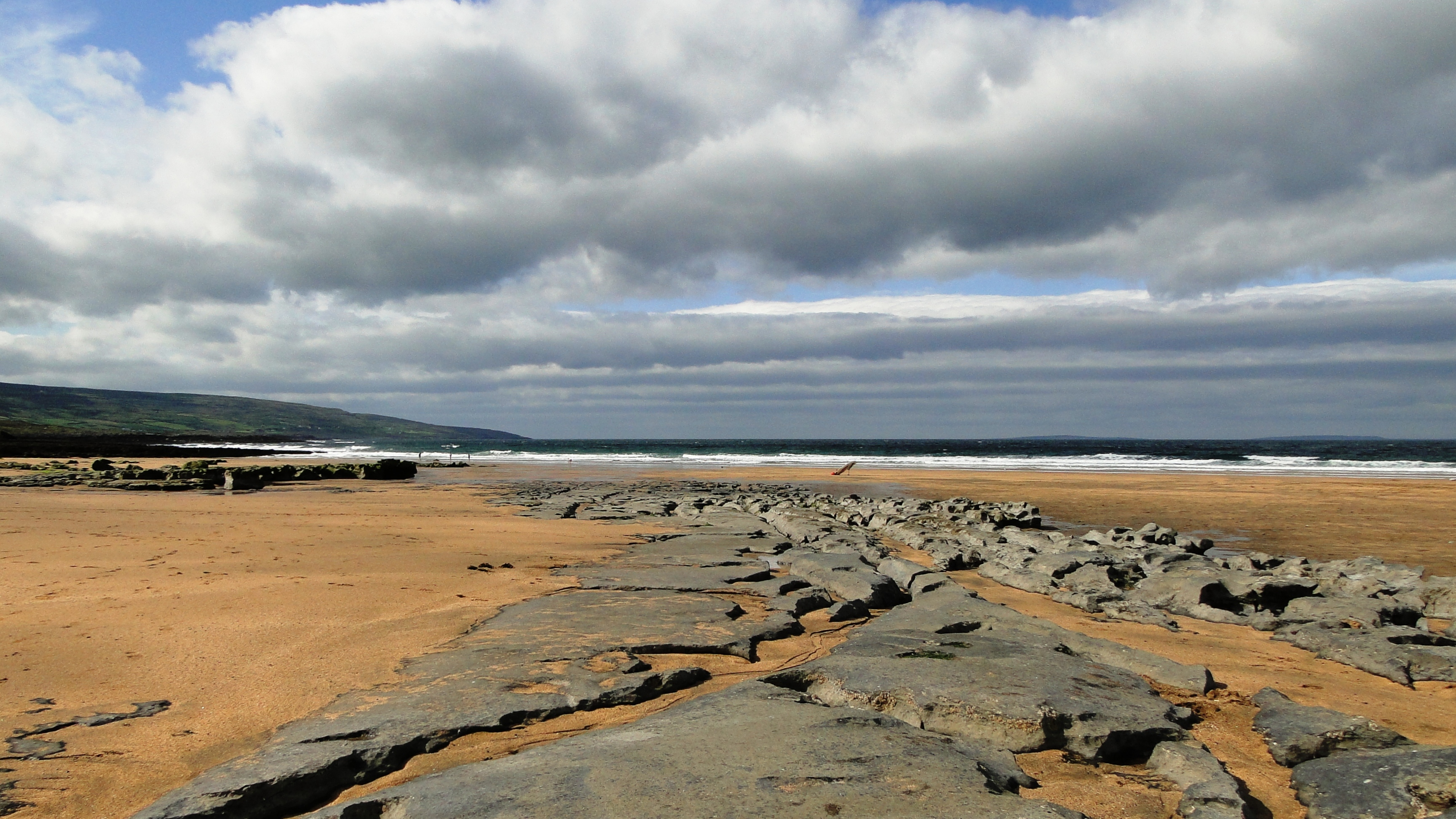
The beach at Fanore at low tide with limestone exposed. Aran Islands in the background, right.

=== Location ===
Lying on the R477 road between Ballyvaughan and Doolin, Fanore has an extensive sandy beach and sand dunes (known as the "Rabbit Warren") around the mouth of the Caher River. It is also officially recognised as the longest village in Europe.

== History ==
Remains of a Mesolithic dwelling have been found on the north bank of the river.

Nineteenth-century historical maps highlight buildings of interest in Fanore including Fanore Lodge as well as its archaeological heritage.

== Economy ==
The village is very popular with walkers, surfers, rock climbers (being 6 km north of Ailladie - Ballyreen Point), tourists and is particularly interesting to botanists, owing to its location on the edge of the Burren – renowned for its unique flora and fauna. It has a pub, a post office/shop, and a restaurant, as well as a surfing school near the beach.

== Notable people ==
- John Breslin, Irish academic, entrepreneur, author
- Maureen Dowd, American columnist and author, daughter of Michael Dowd from Fanore
- John O'Donohue, Irish poet, author, priest, and Hegelian philosopher, laid to rest in Craggagh Cemetery
- Francis Stuart, Irish writer, former resident of Fanore, laid to rest in Craggagh Cemetery

== Transport ==
Bus Éireann route number 350 links Fanore to several locations: Ennis, Ennistymon, Cliffs of Moher, Doolin, Lisdoonvarna, Kinvara and Galway. There are a number of journeys each way daily. Onward rail and bus connections are available at Ennis and Galway.

== Popular culture ==
Fanore has appeared many times on Irish television: in particular, the Father Ted series often featured scenes filmed in Fanore (most famously, the episode titled "Hell") and its surrounding villages.

== See also ==
- List of towns and villages in Ireland
- Ailladie, nearby rock-climbing sea-cliffs (also called Ballyreen Cliffs)
- Ballyryan, nearby rock-climbing crag (also called Ballyreen)
