= Dalkey Hill =

Hill in Ireland

Coordinates: 53°16′N 6°06′W

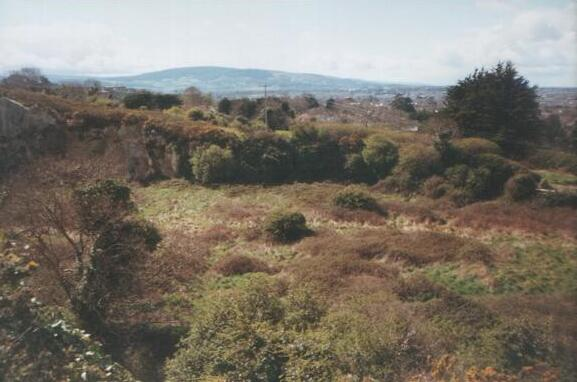
Dalkey Hill

Dalkey Hill (/ˈdɔːki/ DAW-kee; Irish: Cnoc Dheilginse) is the northernmost of the two hills which form the southern boundary of Dublin Bay (the other being Killiney Hill). Dalkey Hill is 140 metres high and has views over the surrounding areas : Dublin to the northwest; the Irish Sea and the mountains of Wales (on a clear day) to the east and southeast; and Bray Head and the Wicklow Mountains to the south.

Dalkey Hill and Killiney Hill are both part of Killiney Hill Park, a small public park overlooking the villages of Dalkey to the north and Killiney to the west. The park is crossed by a number of walking tracks, and with views from all directions, is a used by walkers and hikers from the surrounding areas.

Extensive quarrying of Dalkey Hill in the 19th century has resulted in the existence of Dalkey Quarry, which is now a rock-climbing location. Dalkey Hill and areas to the east and south of Dalkey Village were formerly the lands of Dalkey Common.
