= Pitch (climbing) =

Steep section of a climbing route requiring a rope

Single and multi-pitch climbing

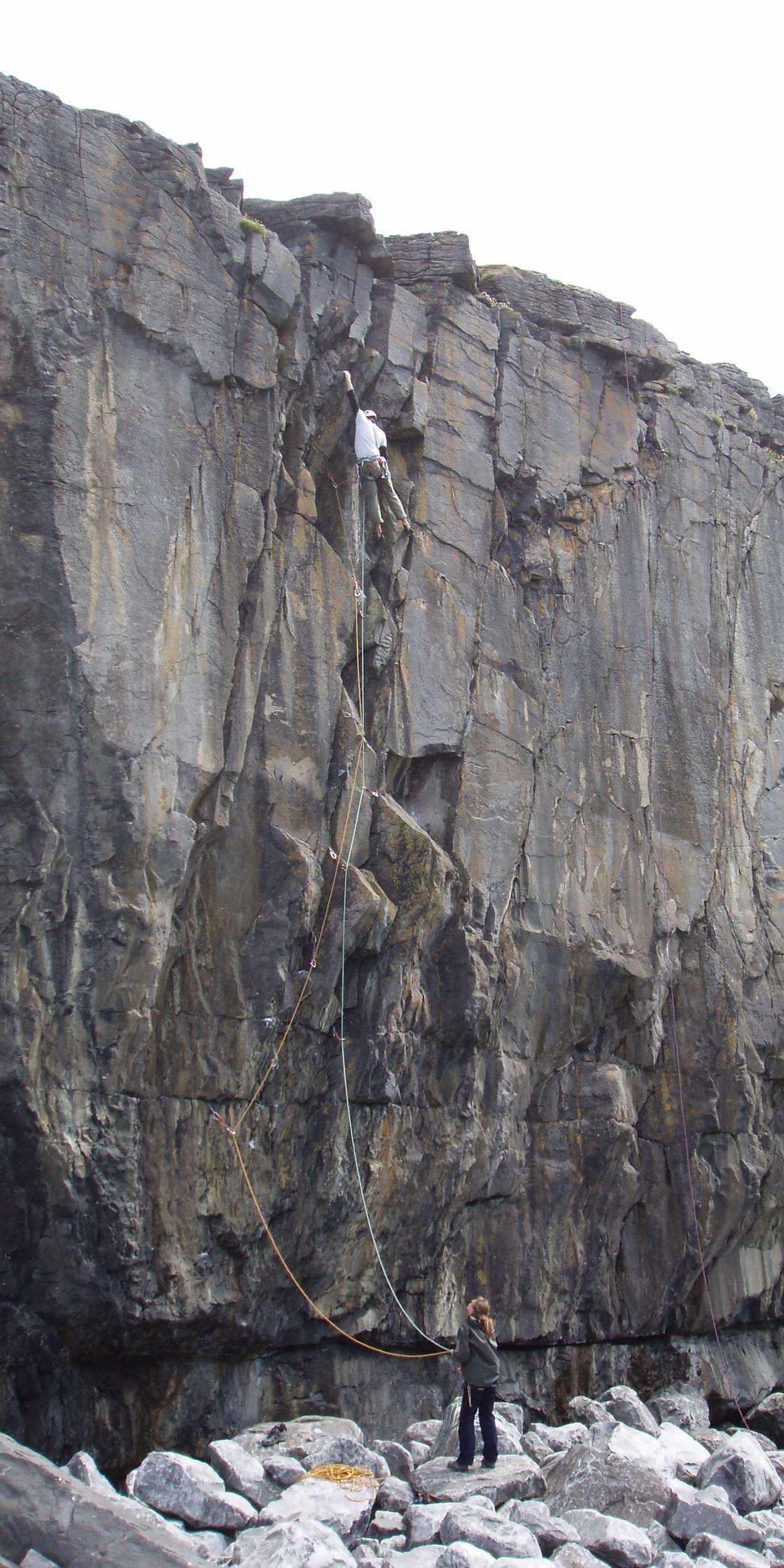
Marchanded Crack, a 28 metre single-pitch route in Ailladie.

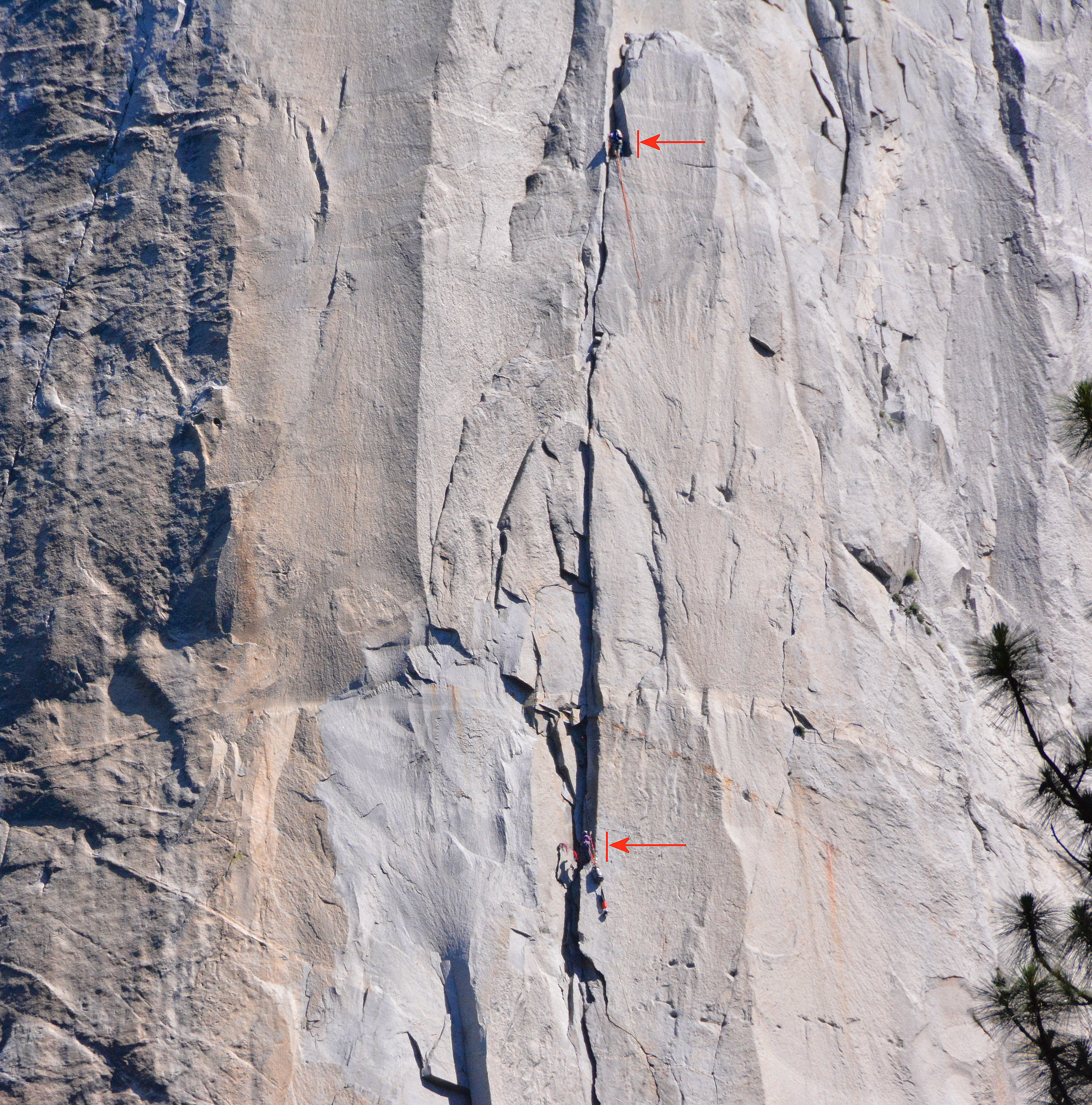
Two climbers (red arrows) with 'leader' (on top) and 'second' (below), on a pitch of the 1,000 metre 31-pitch route, The Nose, on El Capitan

In climbing, a pitch is a section of a climbing route between two belay points (or belay stations), and is most commonly related to the task of lead climbing (going up), but is also related to abseiling (going down). Climbing on routes that require only one pitch is known as single-pitch climbing, and climbing on routes with more than one pitch is known as multi-pitch climbing (where the number is large, it can be big wall or alpine climbing).

Modern climbing ropes are typically 60–70 metres (200–230 ft) in length, which sets the theoretical maximum length of a 'pitch', however, other factors mean that the average pitch on a multi-pitch route is circa 30–40 metres (98–131 ft) in length. Advanced climbing techniques such as simul climbing can materially reduce—and even completely remove—the need for 'pitches' on a multi-pitch climbing route. The term is also used in caving.

== Description ==
In lead climbing — either in rock climbing, mountaineering, and ice climbing — the term 'pitch' describes the length of a section of a climbing route between belays of a 'lead climber'. A route that requires a leader to be belayed only once (ignoring any follow-up belay of the 'second climber' by the leader), is called a 'single-pitch' route; where there are multiple belays of the leader, it is called a 'multi-pitch climb'. The term is also applied to the reverse process of abseiling, where it denotes the number of anchor points needed to complete the abseil (abseil anchor points are often, but not always, the lead climbing belay points).

Most lead climbing route — particularly in sport climbing — are 'single-pitch'. Single-pitch routes vary from 10 metres (33 ft) to the full length of the climbing rope, which is typically 60–70 metres (200–230 ft). Very short single-pitch routes (under 10 metres (33 ft) in length) can be classed as highball bouldering routes, and may not require any protection or the need for belaying. The concept of a 'pitch' is redundant in bouldering.

Multi-pitch climbing introduces greater risk and requires greater skills and additional climbing equipment. In big wall climbing and in alpine climbing, it is possible to have multi-pitch routes with over 30 pitches, with notable examples being the 1,000-metre (3,300 ft) 31-pitch big wall route, The Nose (VI, 5.9, C2) on El Capitan, or the 1,200-metre (3,900 ft) +30-pitch alpine climbing route, the Walker Spur (ED1, IV, 5c/6a, A1) on the Grandes Jorasses.

Climbing guidebooks will typically have a topo that outlines the key features of each individual pitches on a given climbing route (e.g. grade, length, climbing challenges, availability of climbing protection and belay stations etc.,).

== Length ==
Pitches on multi-pitch climbing routes

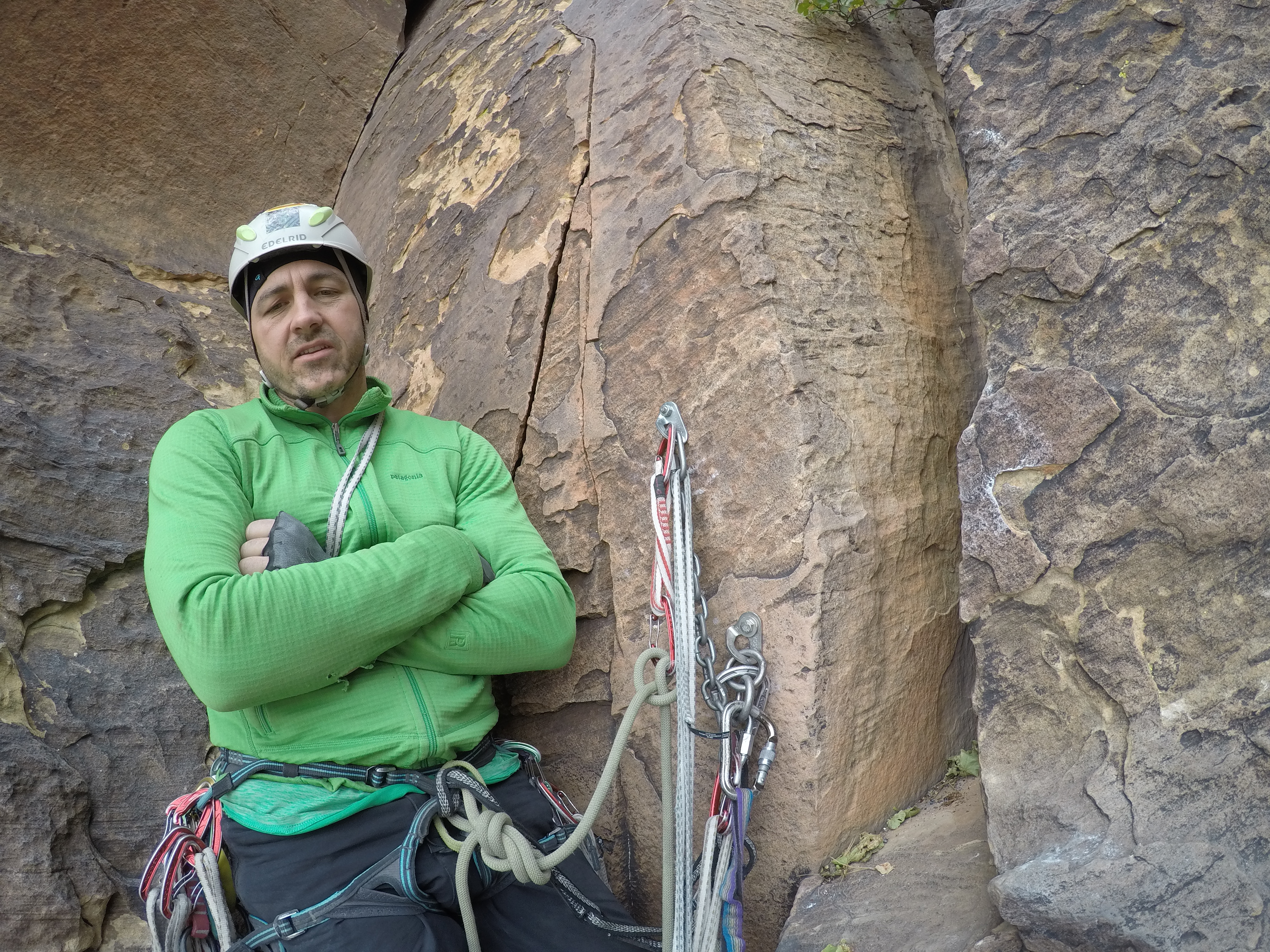
Belayer at a solid belay station on the 167-metre (548 ft) multi-pitch route, The Nightcrawler (5.10+, 5-pitch), in Red Rocks.

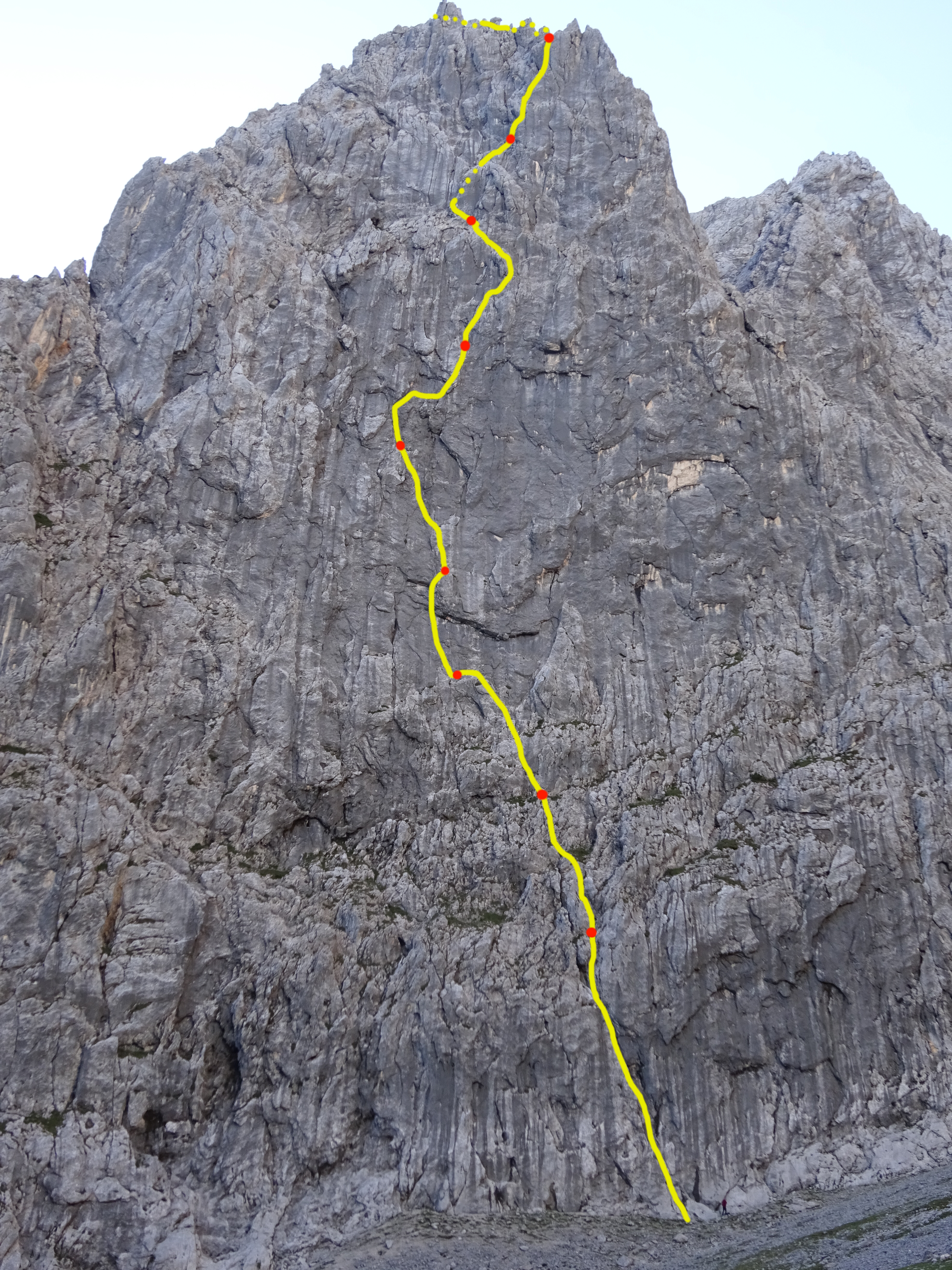
Topo of the 320-metre multi-pitch route, Brych (VI+, 9-pitch), Germany.

A single-pitch route can range from 7 metres (23 ft) to the full length of the climbing rope (by definition, the longest belay of a 'leader' is limited by the length of the rope). In the 1960s to the 1980s, climbing ropes were typically 50 metres (160 ft) in length, however, modern ropes are typically 60–70 metres (200–230 ft) in length (and can extend to 80–100 metres (260–330 ft)), which sets the current theoretical maximum length of a 'pitch'.

On multi-pitch routes, the typical average length of a pitch tends to be in the 30–40 metres (98–131 ft) range, which is well inside the length of the most commonly used modern climbing ropes. This is due to the effect of other factors that also determine the ideal length of pitches (and thus the total number of pitches) on a multi-pitch route, including:

- Belay stations. In multi-pitch climbing, the availability of secure—and comfortable—belay stations is an important factor for climbers; thus where a particularly good belay station presents itself, a pitch might be shortened to avail of it.
- Equipment weight. Longer climbing ropes mean greater weight—and more rope drag—on the lead climber; very long pitches mean the leader needs to carry a greater weight of protection equipment (e.g. large SCLDs on a crack climbing route).
- Obstacles and features. Overhangs, roofs, and traverses may require pitches to be broken up to enable the climbers to set themselves up properly. Danger zones (e.g. couloirs prone to avalanche or rockfall) may also have shorter pitches to get both climbers out of the danger area quickly.
- Rope drag. If the line of a pitch is not straight but instead follows an indirect or a zig-zag line (of the climbing protection follows such a line), then the leader will experience rope drag, which can limit the length of the pitch (i.e. the pitch has to be broken up into smaller sections).
- Technical difficulty. If the technical grade of a pitch is high—and particularly relative to the other pitches on the route—then it may be shortened to give the leader a rest after completing it. Conversely, pitches of easier relative technical grades can often be full rope lengths.

== Linking pitches ==
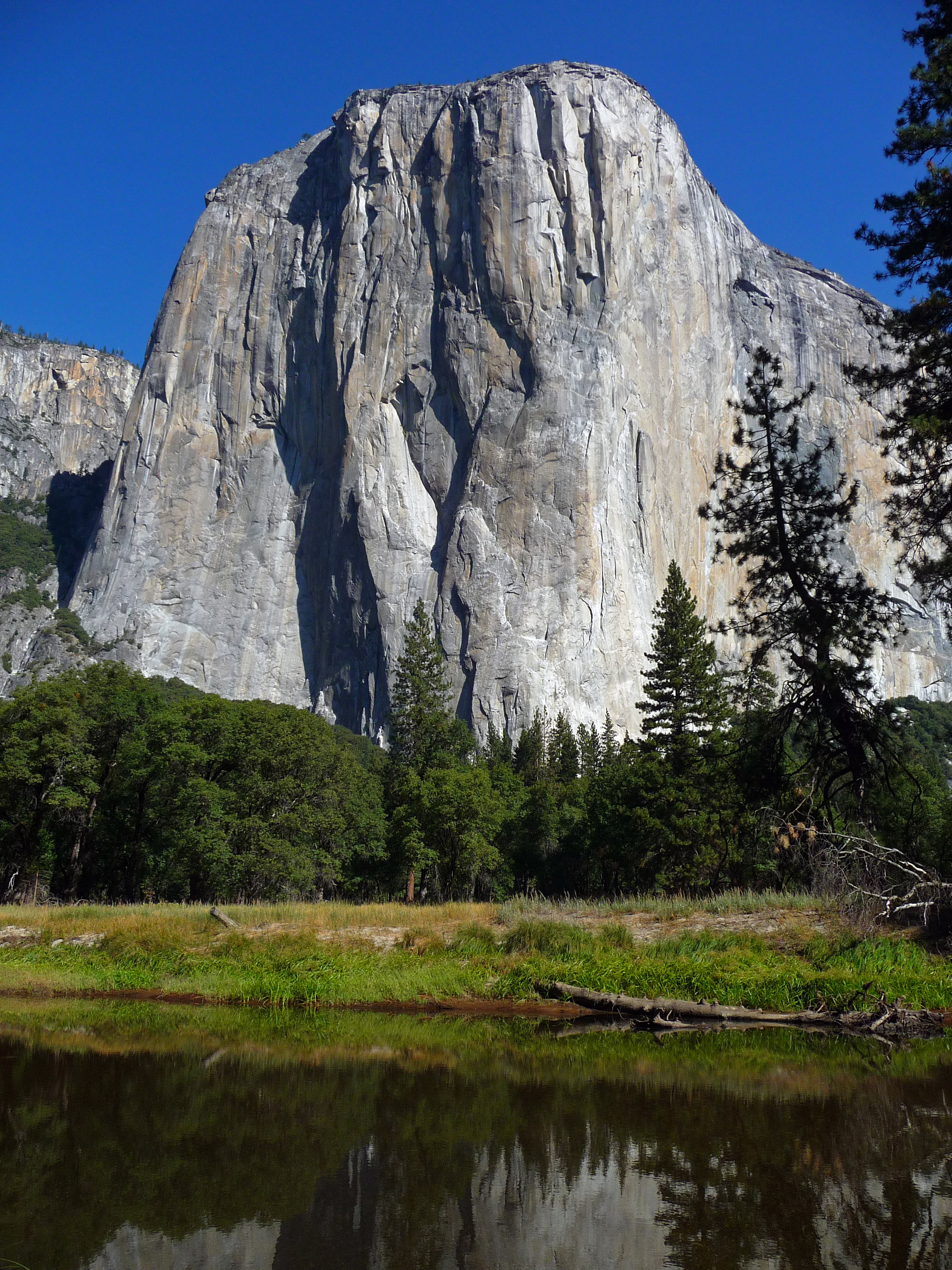
The Nose climbing route on El Capitan is almost 1,000 metres (3,300 ft) metres in length, and requires 31 pitches (i.e. an average pitch length of over 30 metres) to reach the top of the route.

On long but easier routes, the climbing pair may use simul climbing (or a running belay), whereby both climbers simultaneously ascend the route. The 'lead climber' acts like on a normal lead climb, however, the 'second' does not remain belaying in a static position, but instead also climbs, removing/unclipping the protection equipment of the 'lead climber'. Both climbers are tied to the rope at all times, and both make sure that there are several points of protection in situ between them. Simul climbing is only performed on terrain both climbers are comfortable on, as any fall is serious; often the stronger climber goes second. In such a scenario, the concept of a 'pitch' is redundant as the pair keeps moving through the belay stations that mark the end of a normal pitch.

Simul climbing techniques, and the linking of pitches, are very common in alpine climbing, where snowfields can be simul-combined as one continuous pitch (although when iced, they have to be belayed in smaller pitches). A classic example is the 1,800-metre (5,900 ft) 1938 Heckmair Route (ED2, V−, A0, 60° snow) on the Eiger, which has 7-10 sections that most parties will lead climb as individual pitches (e.g. "The Ice Hose", "The Ice Chimney", "The Quartz Crack"), while much of the rest of the route can be simul-climbed as a continuous pitch.

Speed climbing on multi-pitch rock climbing routes can also use simul-climbing techniques for greater efficiency. For example, many speed climbing pairs on the 31-pitch route, The Nose, use simul-climbing on the easier established pitches, thus reducing the number of actual pitches (i.e. a 'leader' being belayed by the 'second' who is static) that they need, which significantly speeds up their rate of ascent.

In addition, free solo climbing, which by definition avoids using any form of belaying (and therefore any need for any belay stations), can link all the pitches on a route together, with the free soloist only stopping at rest points (which may or may not be a belay station); the concept of a pitch is, therefore, less relevant in free solo climbing.

The techniques of simul-climbing and free solo climbing—both of which avoid climbing in 'pitches', as there is no need for a belay—involve significantly greater risk to the climber(s), but by definition make the concept of a 'pitch' redundant.

== In caving ==
The term 'pitch' is also used by cavers to refer to a very steep or vertical section (called a drop, pit, pot, or a shaft) in a cave that needs ladders or single rope technique to descend and ascend (a drop that can be descended and ascended without equipment is a 'climb'). As caving rope lengths are variable, the length of a 'pitch' is that of the 'drop'. The deepest known pitch is 603 m (1,978 ft) in Vrtiglavica Cave in the Julian Alps, Slovenia.

== See also ==
- List of grade milestones in rock climbing, records in single-pitch and multi-pitch climbing
