= Aspect (geography) =

Compass direction that a slope faces

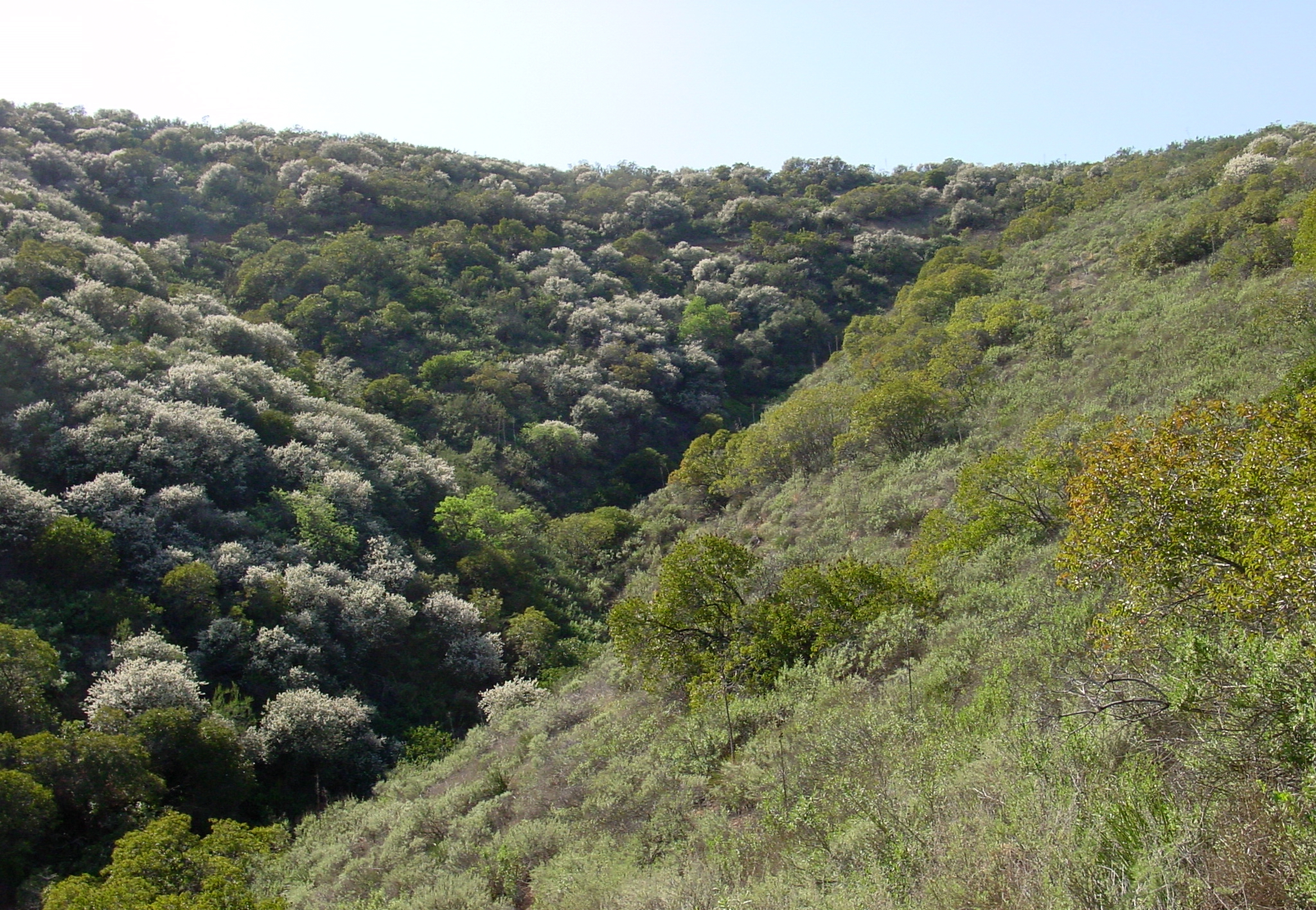
Slope effect, a vegetational result of aspect, in evidence in the coastal sage scrub community of southern California's Santa Monica Mtns. The slope on the left side is north-facing, thus moister and dominated by Ceanothus sp. The south-facing slope on the right side receives more direct sun, and thus is much drier, and is more sparsely vegetated with the more drought tolerant Artemisia californica and Yucca whipplei.

In physical geography and physical geology, aspect (also known as exposure) is the compass direction or azimuth that a terrain surface faces.

For example, a slope landform on the eastern edge of the Rockies toward the Great Plains is described as having an easterly aspect. A slope which falls down to a deep valley on its western side and a shallower one on its eastern side has a westerly aspect or is a west-facing slope. The direction a slope faces can affect the physical and biotic features of the slope, known as a slope effect.

The term aspect can also be used to describe a related distinct concept: the horizontal alignment of a coastline. Here, the aspect is the direction which the coastline is facing towards the sea. For example, a coastline with sea to the northeast (as in most of Queensland) has a northeasterly aspect.

Aspect is complemented by grade (or inclination angle) to characterize the surface gradient.

== Importance ==
Aspect can have a strong influence on temperature. This is because of the angle of the Sun in the Northern and Southern hemispheres which is less than 90 degrees or directly overhead. In the Northern Hemisphere, the north side of slopes is often shaded, while the southern side receives more solar radiation for a given surface area insolation because the slope is tilted toward the Sun and is not shaded directly by the Earth itself. The further north or south, and closer to winter solstice, the more pronounced the effects of aspect of this are, and on steeper slopes the effect is greater with no energy received on slopes with an angle greater than 22.5° at 40° north on December 22 (winter solstice).

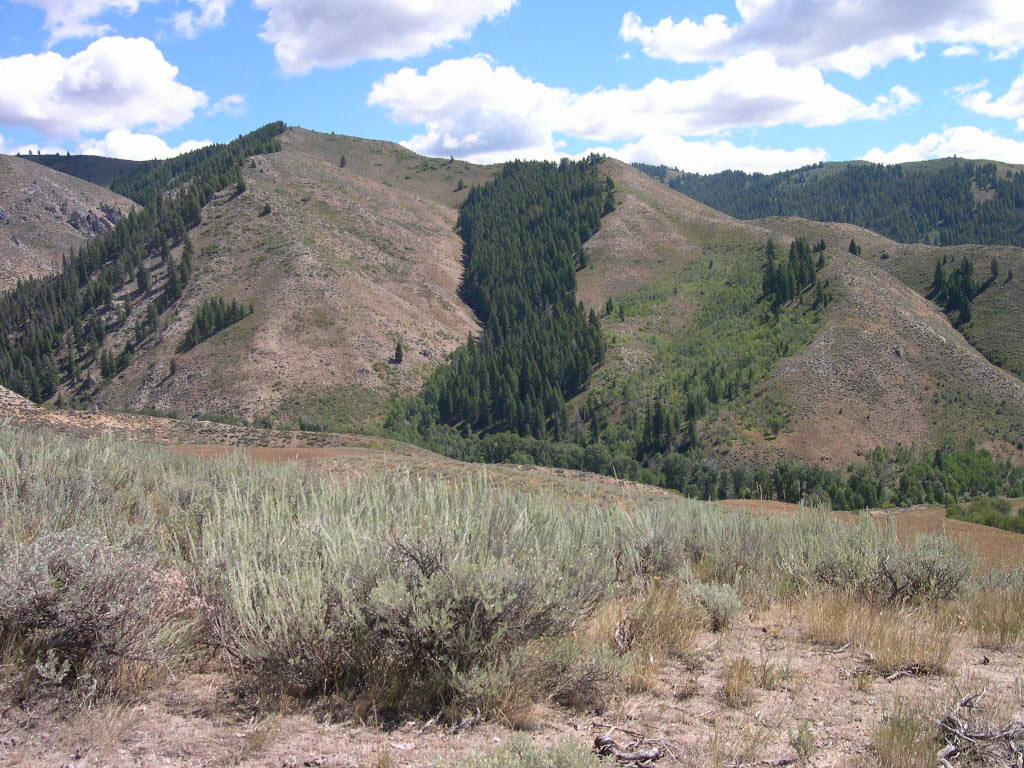
Effects of aspect on vegetation can be clearly seen in this photo from Southwest Idaho near Anderson Ranch Reservoir. The north facing slopes receive more snow often because of prevailing winds and are shaded from direct sunlight during the winter, consequently they have more water available to support trees and forests, while the south facing slopes which receive more insolation are much hotter and dryer and support only smaller more desert adapted woody plant species. North facing slopes here are dominated by a Pinus ponderosa, Pseudotsuga menziesii forest while the south facing slopes are mainly dominated by desert shrubs Artemisia tridentata and Purshia tridentata.

The aspect of a slope can make very significant influences on its local climate (microclimate). For example, because the Sun's rays are in the west at the hottest time of day in the afternoon, in most cases a west-facing slope will be warmer than a sheltered east-facing slope (unless large-scale rainfall influences dictate otherwise). This can have major effects on altitudinal and polar limits of tree growth and also on the distribution of vegetation that requires large quantities of moisture. In Australia, for example, remnants of rainforest are almost always found on east-facing slopes which are protected from dry westerly wind.

Similarly, in the Northern Hemisphere a south-facing slope (more open to sunlight and warm winds) will therefore generally be warmer and drier due to higher levels of evapotranspiration than a north-facing slope. This can be seen in the Swiss Alps, where farming is much more extensive on south-facing than on north-facing slopes. In the Himalayas, this effect can be seen to an extreme degree, with south-facing slopes being warm, wet and forested, and north-facing slopes cold, dry but much more heavily glaciated.

== Soil aspects ==
In some locales there are patterns of soil differences related to differences in aspect. Strong slopes with equatorward aspects tend to have soil organic matter levels and seasonal influences similar to level slopes at lower elevation whereas poleward aspects have soil development similarities to level soils at higher elevations. Soils with a prevailing windward aspect will typically be shallower, and often with more developed subsoil characteristics, than adjacent soils on the leeward where decelerating winds tend to deposit more air-borne particulate material. Outside of the tropics, soils with an aspect directed toward an early afternoon solar position will typically have the lowest soil moisture content and lowest soil organic matter content relative to other available aspects in a locale. Aspect similarly influences seasonal soil biological processes that are temperature dependent. Particulate laden winds often blow from a prevailing direction near solar early afternoon; the effects combine in a pattern common to both hemispheres.

== Coastal aspects ==
These are usually of importance only in the tropics, but there they produce many unexpected climatic effects:

- The dryness of the Dahomey Gap, due to the rain-bearing winds moving parallel to the coast.
- The summer dryness of the Coromandel Coast due to the southerly monsoon flowing parallel to the coast. Its wetness during the northeast monsoon is similarly explained.
- The anomalous late autumn rainy seasons of central Vietnam and the coastal zone of northeastern Brazil for the same reason as above.
- The unusual dryness of Port Moresby compared to the rest of New Guinea is because the National Capital District lies parallel to the trade winds which have a drying effect. In Gulf Province and Lae, which receive their full force, rainfall during southern winter is exceedingly heavy, with rainfall and thunderstorms during the rainy season.
- The relative dryness of the Queensland coast has the same cause as with Port Moresby.

== See also ==
- Microclimate
- Pedology
- Strike and dip
