= Sherman (name) =

Sherman is a surname that originated in the Anglo-Saxon language. It means a "shearer of woolen garments", being derived from the words scearra, or "shears", and mann, or "man". The name is cognate with Sharman, Shearman and Shurman. Sherman has also been regularly used as a given name in the United States. This was probably originally in honor of Roger Sherman, though after the Civil War William Tecumseh Sherman was also an influence.

== People with the surname ==
- The Sherman Brothers, American songwriting duo
- Adelmorn Sherman (1820–1875), American farmer and politician
- Ahuva Sherman (1926–2023), Israeli artist
- Al Sherman (1897–1973), American songwriter
- Alan Sherman (born 1957), American computer scientist
- Alex Sherman (born 1984), Moldovan wrestler under the ring name Alex Koslov
- Sir Alfred Sherman (1919–2006), British journalist
- Aliza Sherman (born 1964), entrepreneur, author, women's issues activist and lecturer
- Allan Sherman (1924–1973), American comedian
- Allie Sherman (1923–2015), American football player and coach
- Alpheus Sherman (1780–1866), American politician from New York
- Althea Sherman (1853–1943), American illustrator, educator, ornithologist and writer
- Amy Sherman-Palladino (born 1966), American television writer, director and producer
- Art Sherman (born 1937), American horse trainer and jockey
- Ben Sherman (1925–1987, born Arthur Benjamin Sugarman), British clothing company founder
- Bernard Sherman (1942–2017), Canadian businessman
- Bim Sherman (1950–2000), Jamaican musician and singer-songwriter
- Bob Sherman (actor) (1940–2004), American dramaturge, playwright and film and television actor
- Bobby Sherman (1943–2025), American singer and actor
- Brad Sherman (born 1954), American politician from California
- Buren R. Sherman (1836–1904), American politician from Iowa
- Carl Sherman (c. 1891–1956), American politician from New York
- Carlos Sherman (1934–2005), Belarusian translator and writer
- Charles Robert Sherman (1788–1829), American lawyer and public servant
- Charles Taylor Sherman (1811–1879), American lawyer and judge from Ohio
- Chase Sherman (born 1989), American UFC fighter
- Chloe Sherman (born 1969), American photographer
- Cindy Sherman (born 1954), American artist
- David Sherman (1944–2022), American novelist
- Eleanor Sherman Thackara (1859–1915), daughter of General William Tecumseh Sherman
- Elna Sherman (1888–1964) American composer and musicologist
- Forrest Sherman (1896–1951), American admiral
- Francis Cornwall Sherman (1805–1870), American politician
- Francis Trowbridge Sherman (1825–1905) American general
- Frederick C. Sherman (1888–1957), American admiral
- Gary Sherman (director) (born 1945), American film director
- Gary Sherman (Wisconsin politician) (born 1949), American jurist and legislator from Wisconsin
- Gene Sherman (disambiguation), a number of people
- George Sherman (1908–1991), American film director
- Geraldine M. Sherman (1922–2012), American fashion designer
- Harry Sherman (1884–1952), American film producer
- Henry Clapp Sherman (1875–1955), American food chemist and nutritionist
- Henry L. Sherman (1870–1938), American lawyer and judge
- Hilde Sherman (1923–2011), German Holocaust survivor and memoirist
- Ida May Sherman (1860–1934), American clubwoman and philanthropist
- Jack Sherman (1956–2020), American guitarist
- Jack Sherman (statistician)
- James Sherman (comics), American comic book artist
- James Sherman (cricketer) (1791–1831), English cricketer
- James Sherman (minister) (1796–1862), British Congregationalist and abolitionist
- James Morgan Sherman (1890–1956), American bacteriologist and dairy scientist
- James Schoolcraft Sherman (1855–1912), American vice president
- Jane Sherman (1908–2010) American writer, performer and Rockette
- John Sherman (clergyman) (1772–1828), American Unitarian pastor
- John Sherman (climber) (born 1959), American climber
- John Sherman (cricketer) (1788–1861), English cricketer
- John Sherman (Ohio) (1823–1900), American politician from Ohio
- Joseph Sherman (1945–2006), Canadian poet and visual arts editor
- Joseph J. Sherman (born 1980), American marketing strategist and artist
- Judson W. Sherman (1808–1881), American politician from New York
- Justin Sherman (born 1987), Australian rules footballer
- Kevin Sherman (born 1968), American football player and coach
- Lawrence W. Sherman (born 1949), academic criminologist
- Lawrence Yates Sherman (1858–1939), American politician from Illinois
- Linda Sherman (born 1950), American immunologist
- Lowell Sherman (1885–1934), American actor and film director
- Lyman R. Sherman (1804–1839), early leader in the Latter Day Saint movement
- Martin Sherman (dramatist) (born 1938), American screenwriter and playwright
- Martin Sherman (actor), American actor
- Max Sherman (Texas politician) (born 1935), American politician from Texas
- Max Sherman (Ontario politician), Canadian businessperson and politician
- Mike Sherman (born 1954), American football coach
- Moses Sherman (1853–1932) American land and transportation developer
- Najahe Sherman, American television news anchor and reporter
- Ned Sherman (1807–1907), American politician
- Philip Sherman (1610–1687), Rhode Island pioneer
- Raj Sherman (born 1966), Canadian politician
- Ransom Sherman (1898–1985), American radio and television personality and writer
- Ray Sherman (born 1951), American football player and coach
- Richard Sherman (born 1988) American football cornerback
- Richard M. Sherman (1928–2024), American songwriter, half of the Sherman Brothers
- Richard Updike Sherman (1819–1895), American politician and newspaper publisher/editor from New York
- Robert Sherman (disambiguation)
  - Robert B. Sherman (1925–2012), American songwriter, half of the Sherman Brothers
  - Robert J. Sherman (born 1968), American songwriter, son of Robert B
- Roger Sherman (1721–1793), American lawyer and politician
- Roger Sherman (American football) (1872–1957), American football player, coach and lawyer
- Russell Sherman (1930–2023), American pianist
- Ruth Sherman (1903–1965), American bridge player
- Sarah Sherman (born 1993), American comedian and actress
- Socrates N. Sherman (1801–1873), American politician
- Stuart Sherman (1881–1926), American literary critic
- Teddi Sherman (1921–2019), American actress
- Tom Sherman (American football) (born 1945), American football player
- Tom Sherman (cricketer) (1825–1911), English cricketer
- Thomas Ewing Sherman (1856–1933), American lawyer and priest
- Thomas W. Sherman (1813–1879), American army officer
- Vincent Sherman (1906–2006), American film director and actor
- Wendy Sherman, American diplomat
- Will Sherman (defensive back) (1927–1997), American football player
- William Sherman (disambiguation), multiple people

== People with the given name ==
- Sherman Adams (1899–1986), American politician
- Sherman Alexie (born 1966), American writer, poet, filmmaker and comedian
- Sherman Augustus, American actor
- Sherman Austin, American anarchist and musician
- Sherman Barton (1875–1947), American baseball player
- Sherman Bell, leader of the Colorado National Guard
- Sherman A. Bernard (1925–2012), American businessman
- Sherman Billingsley (1900–1966), American bootlegger and founder and owner of New York's Stork Club nightclub
- Sherman Block (1924–1998), American lawman from California
- Sherman Booth (1812–1904), American abolitionist, editor, and politician
- Sherman Chaddlesone (1947–2013), Native American painter
- Sherman Chung, Hong Kong cantopop singer
- Sherman Dillard, former American basketball player
- Sherman Douglas (born 1966), basketball player
- Sherman Dreiseszun (1922–2007), American banker and real estate developer
- Sherman Edwards (1919–1981), American songwriter
- Sherman Fairchild (1896–1971), inventor and entrepreneur
- Sherman Feller (1918–1994), American musical composer and radio personality
- Sherman Hemsley (1938–2012), American actor
- Sherman D. Horton Jr. (1931–2014), American justice from New Hampshire
- Sherman Howard (born 1949), American actor
- Sherman Kwek (born 1975/76), Singaporean businessman
- Sherman McMaster (1853–1892?), American outlaw turned lawman
- Sherman Minton (1890–1965), American politician and judge
- Sherman A. Minton (1919–1999), American herpetologist and toxicologist
- Sherman Moreland (1868–1951), New York politician and Philippine judge
- Sherman Parker (1971–2008), American politician
- Sherman E. Smalley (1866–1958), American politician and jurist

== Fictional characters ==
- Ben Sherman (Southland)
- Liz Sherman, in the Hellboy comic book series
- Sherman Klump, the title character from The Nutty Professor
- Sherman T. Potter, from M*A*S*H

== See also ==
- Attorney General Sherman (disambiguation)
- General Sherman (disambiguation)
- Judge Sherman (disambiguation)
- Justice Sherman (disambiguation)
- Senator Sherman (disambiguation)
- Sherman (disambiguation)
- Sharman
- Shearman (disambiguation)
- Scherman (surname)
- Shurman
