= Sherman =

Sherman most commonly refers to:

- Sherman (name), including a list of people and fictional characters with the given name or surname
  - William Tecumseh Sherman (1820–1891), American Civil War General
- M4 Sherman, a World War II American tank

Sherman may also refer to:

== Places ==
=== United States ===
- Sherman Island (California)
- Mount Sherman, Colorado
- Sherman, Connecticut, a New England town
  - Sherman (CDP), Connecticut, the central village in the town
- Sherman, Illinois, a village
- Sherman, Kansas
- Sherman, Kentucky
- Sherman, Maine, a town
- Sherman, Michigan, an unincorporated community
- Sherman, Minnesota, an unincorporated community
- Sherman, Mississippi, a town
- Sherman, Missouri, an unincorporated community
- Sherman, New Mexico, an unincorporated community
- Sherman (town), New York
  - Sherman (village), New York
- Sherman, South Dakota, a town
- Sherman, Texas, a city
- Sherman, Washington, a ghost town
- Sherman, West Virginia, an unincorporated community
- Sherman, Clark County, Wisconsin, a town
- Sherman, Dunn County, Wisconsin, a town
- Sherman, Iron County, Wisconsin, a town
- Sherman, Sheboygan County, Wisconsin, a town
- Sherman, Wyoming, a ghost town

=== Elsewhere ===
- Sherman Island (Antarctica)
- Fort Sherman, a former United States Army base at the Panama Canal
- Sherman Avenue (Hamilton, Ontario), Canada

== Ships ==
- USS General Sherman, a Union Civil War gunboat
- SS General Sherman, an American-owned paddle steamship involved in the General Sherman incident of 1866
- Sherman, a United States merchant steamship, formerly USS Princess Royal
- USCGC Sherman (WHEC-720), a United States Coast Guard cutter
- USS Forrest Sherman, two ships of the US Navy

== Other uses ==
- Sherman (constructor), a former American racing car constructor
- Sherman (Pacific Electric), a former railroad in California, USA
- 21621 Sherman, a main-belt asteroid
- The Sherman (Omaha, Nebraska), an apartment building on the National Register of Historic Places
- Sherman Mine, an abandoned open pit mine in Temagami, Ontario, Canada
- Sherman Mine (Colorado), a mine on Mount Sherman
- Sherman, Texas minor league baseball teams, active intermittently between 1895 and 1952
- Sherman Theater, Stroudsburg, Pennsylvania, USA
- Sherman Theatre, Cardiff, Wales
- Sherman (US Supreme Court case), an 1888 United States Supreme Court case
- Sherman Pledge, a promise not to run for a public office

== See also ==
- Sherman County (disambiguation)
- Sherman Township (disambiguation)
- Sherman Antitrust Act, an 1890 US act
- Sherman Silver Purchase Act, an 1890 US act
- Scherman (surname)
- Sharman
- Shearman (disambiguation)
- Shurman
