= James Sherman =

James Sherman may refer to:

- James S. Sherman (1855–1912), vice president of the United States under president William Howard Taft, 1909–1912
- James Sherman (comics), comic book artist
- James Sherman (minister) (1796–1862), British Congregationalist and abolitionist
- James Sherman (cricketer) (1791–1831), English cricketer
- James Morgan Sherman, American professor of bacteriology
- Jim Sherman (baseball) (born 1960), American college baseball coach and player

== See also ==
- James Shearman (born 1970), English composer
