= Will Sherman =

Will Sherman may refer to:

- Will Sherman (defensive back) (1927–1997), American football defensive back
- Will Sherman (offensive lineman) (born 1999), American football offensive lineman
- Will Sherman (rugby union) (born 2003), American rugby union player

== See also ==
- William Sherman (disambiguation)
