= John Sherman (disambiguation) =

John Sherman (1823–1900) was a U.S. politician, serving as a member of the U.S. House Representatives and the U.S. Senate. He later served as the Secretary of State and the Secretary of the Treasury.

John Sherman may also refer to:

- John Sherman (businessman), American businessman
- John Sherman (cricketer) (1788–1861), English cricketer
- John Sherman (climber) (born 1959), American climber
- John Sherman (historian) (died 1671), English archdeacon of Salisbury, known as a historian of Jesus College, Cambridge
- John Sherman (intelligence), American intelligence official
- John Sherman (minister) (1772–1828), American Unitarian pastor
- John J. Sherman (born 1967), American bodybuilder
- John Sherman, MP for Lewes in 1467
- John Sherman, an 1891 novella by W. B. Yeats

== See also ==
- John Shearman (1931–2003), English art historian, pronounced as "John Sherman"
- Jack Sherman (disambiguation)
- John Sherman Cooper (1901–1991), American politician, jurist, and diplomat
