= Chloe =

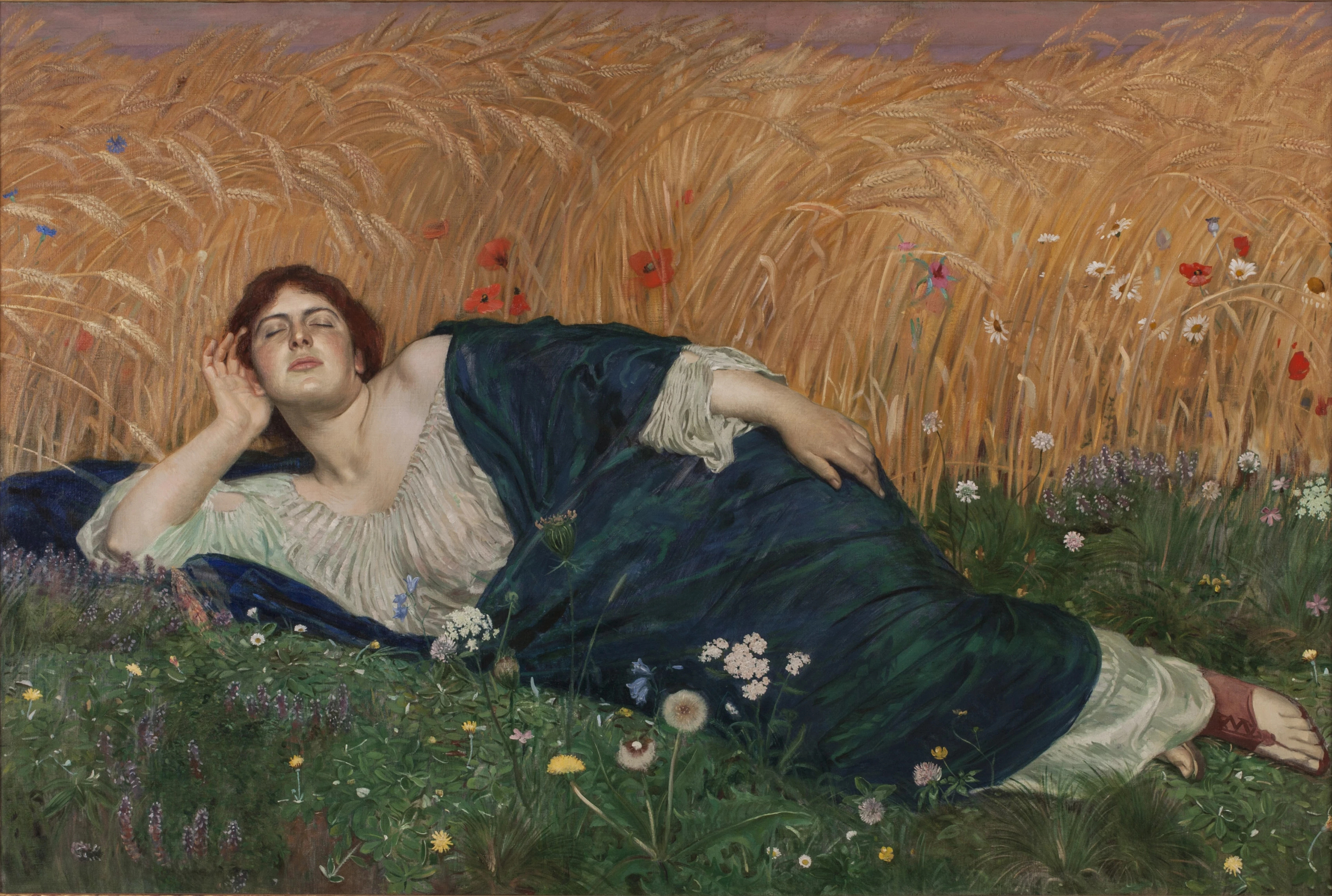
- Demeter goddess of the harvest, who had the epithet Chloe
- Pronunciation: /ˈkloʊi/ KLOH-ee; French: [kloe]; Greek pronunciation: [ˈxlo.i]
- Gender: Female

Origin
- Origin: Greek
- Meaning: Epithet of Demeter, referring to young, green foliage or shoots of plants

Chloe (/ˈkloʊi/; Greek: Χλόη (Note: Ancient Greek: Chlóē, pronounced [kʰló.ɛː] Modern Greek: Chlói, pronounced [ˈxlo.i])), also spelled Chloë, Chlöe, or Chloé, is a feminine name meaning "blooming" or "fertility" in Greek. The name ultimately derives, through Greek, from the Proto-Indo-European root *ǵʰelh₃-, which relates to the colors yellow and green. In Greek the word refers to the young, green foliage or shoots of plants in spring. Χλόη was one of the many epithets of the goddess Demeter. The French spelling is Chloé.

== Popularity ==
The name was a popular Ancient Greek girl's name (cf. the Ancient Greek novel Daphnis and Chloe) and remains a popular Greek name today.

It has been a very popular name in the United Kingdom since the early 1990s, peaking in popularity later in the 1990s and during the first decade of the 21st century.

In Northern Ireland, Chloe was the most popular name for newborn girls from 1997 to 2002, followed by Emma in 2003. It was also one of the most popular girls' names throughout the UK from 1995 to 2002. In 2013, it was the fourth-most popular name for baby girls in Australia.

Chloe was among the five most popular names for newborn girls of Asian descent in the American state of Virginia in 2022. It has ranked among the top one hundred names for newborn American girls nationally since 1998, peaking in 2009 and 2010 when it was the ninth most popular name given to girls. It was the twenty-fourth most popular name for American girls nationally in 2021. The name is occasionally misspelled as "Chole". The United States Social Security Administration noted that a number of parents of girls initially named "Chole" on their birth certificates had filed to correct the spelling to "Chloe" between 2017 and 2022.

In 2022, it was the sixth most popular name given to girls in Canada.

== People ==
- Chloë (Australian singer) (Chloë Stafford), Australian singer
- Chloë Agnew (born 1989), Irish singer and the youngest member of Celtic Woman
- Chloe Alper (born 1981), English singer and bass player for the band Pure Reason Revolution
- Chloë Annett (born 1971), British actress
- Chloe Ashcroft (born 1942), British TV presenter
- Chloe Asaam, Ghanaian fashion designer
- Chloé Aurard (born 1999), French professional ice hockey player
- Chloe Bailey (born 1998), known mononymously as Chlöe, an American singer, songwriter, actress, record producer, and part of the duo Chloe x Halle
- Chloe Barlow, author
- Chloe Bennet (born 1992), Chinese-American actress and singer
- Chloe Bibby (born 1998), Australian basketball player
- Chloe Bridges (born 1991), American actress, singer and pianist
- Chloe Brockett (born 2000), English television personality
- Chloe Bull (born 1994), Welsh footballer
- Chloe Cherry (born 1997), American actress
- Chloe Chivers (born 1999), Welsh footballer
- Chloe Dao (born 1972), fashion designer and television personality
- Chloe Dallimore (b. 1975?), Australian actor, singer and dancer
- Chloe Dalton (born 1993), Australian professional footballer, rugby player and basketballer
- Chloe Domont (born 1987), American television and film writer and director
- Chloe Dunbar (born 2009), Canadian para-athlete
- Chloë Duckworth, British archaeological scientist and reader
- Chloë Farro (born 2003), Aruban swimmer
- Chloe Feoranzo (born 1992), America musician
- Chloe Ferry (born 1995), English television personality
- Chloe Fineman (born 1988), American actress, writer, and comedian
- Chloe Flower (born 1981), American composer, writer, producer and classical pianist
- Chloe Forster (born 2003), Australian basketball player
- Chloë Fox (born 1971), Australian politician
- Chloë Foy, British singer-songwriter
- Chloé Frammery, French-Swiss math teacher, activist, vlogger, and lecturer
- Chloe Franks (born 1963), British actress
- Chloë Grace Moretz (born 1997), American actress
- Chloé Georges (born 1980), a French acrobatic skier
- Chloe Greechan (born 2000), Jersey cricketer and bowls player
- Chloe Gong (born 1998), New Zealand writer
- Chloe Goodman (born 1993), British model and television personality
- Chloé Graftiaux (1987–2010), a Belgian sport climber
- Chloe Grant (born 2006), British racing driver
- Chloë Hanslip (born 1987), British violinist
- Chloé Hayden (born 1997), Australian actress and author
- Chloe Holladay, American majorette
- Chloé Hollings, French-Australian actress
- Chloe Hooper (born 1973), Australian author
- Chloe Michelle Howarth (born 1996), Irish novelist
- Chlöe Howl (born 1995), British singer-songwriter
- Chloe Ing (born 1998), Singaporean figure skater
- Chloé Isaac (born 1991), Canadian synchronized swimmer
- Chloe Isleta (born 1998), Filipino-American swimmer
- Chloe Jackson (born 1996), American professional basketball player
- Chloe Johnson (born 1989), American television personality, beauty pageant title holder, model, dancer and community leader
- Chloe Jones (1975–2005), American model and pornographic actress
- Chloe Jones (motorcyclist) (born 2003), English motorcycle racer
- Khloé Alexandra Kardashian, American reality TV star
- Chloé Katz (born 1986), an American figure skater
- Chloe Kelly (born 1998), English footballer
- Chloe Kim (born 2000), American snowboarder
- Chloe Kitts (born 2004), American basketball player
- Chloé Lambert (born 1976). French actress
- Chloe Latimer (born 1996), Scottish singer and songwriter
- Chloé Leriche, Canadian filmmaker
- Chloe Rose Lattanzi (born 1986), American actress and singer
- Chloe Logarzo (born 1994), Australian footballer
- Chloe Lowery (born 1987), American singer
- Chloe Lukasiak (born 2001), American dancer and actress
- Chloe Marshall (born 1991), British plus-size model
- Chloe Maxmin, American politician
- Chloe Meecham (born 1999), South African water polo player
- Chloë Grace Moretz (born 1997), American actress
- Chloe Moriondo (born 2002), American singer-songwriter and YouTuber
- Chloe Moss (born 1976), British playwright
- Chloe Ann O'Neil (born 1943), New York politician
- Chloé Paquet (born 1994), French tennis player
- Chloe Rogers (born 1985), English field hockey player
- Chloe Saavedra (born 1994), founding member of the music group Chaos Chaos (formerly Smoosh)
- Chloé Sainte-Marie (born 1962), a French Canadian actress and singer
- Sakamata Chloe, a Japanese virtual Youtuber
- Chloë Sevigny (born 1974), American actress
- Chloe Sherman (born 1969), American photographer
- Chloe Slater (born 2003), English singer-songwriter
- Chloe Smith (born 1982), British Conservative Party politician
- Chloe Smith (musician), American folk musician and activist
- Chloe Sutton (born 1992), American swimmer
- Chlöe Swarbrick (born 1994), New Zealand politician and entrepreneur
- Chloe Temtchine, American singer-songwriter
- Chloe Ting (born 1986), Australian YouTuber
- Chloé Wary (born 1995), French comics writer
- Chloe Watson (born 2000), English professional boxer
- Chloe Webb (born 1956), American actress
- Chloé Webster (born 1989), Scottish actress
- Chloe Ardelia Wofford, birth name of Toni Morrison (1931–2019), American author, editor and professor
- Chloé Zhao (born 1982), Chinese filmmaker

== Fictional characters ==
- Chloe, in Mozart's song "An Chloe"
- Chloe, a chihuahua in the movie Beverly Hills Chihuahua
- Chloe, fictional dalmatian character in the television series, Bluey
- Chloe, in Atom Egoyan's 2009 film Chloe
- Chloe, a character in the play Daphnis and Chloe by ancient Greek novelist Longus
- Chloe, fictional character from the movie Deep Impact
- Chloe, fictional character from Don't Trust the B— in Apartment 23
- Chloe, the heroine of the poem The Fable of the Bees by Bernard Mandeville
- Chloe, a character in Froth on the Daydream by Boris Vian
- Chloé, a character in Éric Rohmer's 1972 film Love in the Afternoon
- Chloé, a character in the French television series Madeline
- Chloe, in the Noir anime television series
- Chloe, in the operetta Orpheus in the Underworld by Jacques Offenbach
- Chloe, in the comic opera Princess Ida by Gilbert and Sullivan
- Chloe, in the novel Sleepovers by Jacqueline Wilson
- Chloe, in the novel S.N.U.F.F. by Victor Pelevin
- Chloe, fictional character from the TV series The Tribe
- Aunt Chloe, in the novel Uncle Tom's Cabin by Harriet Beecher Stowe;
- Lucky Chloe, fictional character from the video game series Tekken
- Chloe, co-protagonist of Glitter Force
- Chloe Armstrong, in the television series Stargate Universe
- Chloe Atkinson, in the television series, Emmerdale
- Chloe Beale, from the Pitch Perfect movie franchise
- Chloé Bourgeois (character), from the animated TV series Miraculous: Tales of Ladybug & Cat Noir
- Chloe Branagh, a character from Young Dracula
- Chloe Brennan, in the soap opera One Life to Live
- Chloe Cammeniti, in the Australian soap opera Neighbours
- Chloe Carter, on Harper's Island
- Chloe Cerise, in the Japanese anime Pokémon
- Chlo Charles, in the BBC television series Waterloo Road
- Chloe Carmichael, in the cartoon, The Fairly OddParents
- Chloe Corbin, in PBS Kids Sprout programme Chloe's Closet
- Chloe Decker, in the television series Lucifer
- Chloe Flan, a character from Sabrina: The Animated Series
- Chloe Frazer, from the video game Uncharted franchise
- Khloe Gomez, a character from He's Into Her
- Chloe Harris, from Emmerdale
- Chloe James, from Dog With a Blog
- Chloe Jones, in the television series A Country Practice;
- Chloe King, in the 2011 American television series The Nine Lives of Chloe King
- Chloe Lane, in the television series Days Of Our Lives
- Chloe Mitchell, in the American soap opera The Young and the Restless
- Chloe O'Brian, in the television series 24
- Chloe Payne, in the television series Mercy
- Chloe Park, in the television series We Bare Bears
- Chloé Pig, in the British television series Peppa Pig
- Chloe Price, fictional character from the video game Life Is Strange
- Chloe Pye, a fictional actress and dancer in the 1937 mystery novel Dancers in Mourning by Margery Allingham
- Chlöe Rice, a character in the Netflix television series 13 Reasons Why
- Chloe Richards, in the Australian soap opera Home and Away
- Chloe Saunders, in Kelley Armstrong's Darkest Powers novel trilogy
- Chloe Simon, in Disney's 102 Dalmatians
- Chloe Steele, in the Left Behind novel series
- Chloe Stilton, in the animated television series Horseland
- Chloe Sullivan, in the television series Smallville
- Chloe Talbot, in the television series The Simpsons
- Chloe the Topaz Fairy, in the book franchise Rainbow Magic
- Chloe Valens, in the video game Tales of Legendia
- Chloe Voyle, from the television series Ackley Bridge
- Chloe Wheeler, in the television series Coming of Age
