= 1809 English cricket season =

Cricket season review

The 1809 English cricket season was the 23rd since the foundation of Marylebone Cricket Club (MCC). Thomas Lord opened his Middle Ground after refusing to pay increased rent at the Old Ground. Details of eight historically important eleven-a-side matches are known. (Note: Any match listed in the ACS' Important Match Guide (1981) is historically important, and therefore of the highest standard, whether or not a scorecard might exist. The same applies to numerous matches discovered by researchers since 1981. For further information, see First-class cricket.)

== Events ==
- MCC made revisions to the Laws of Cricket which were republished in their entirety.
- The umpires were required to select the pitch from 1809 with choice of innings to be decided by toss.
- It is about this time that the no-ball rule was first applied re the bowler's foot being over the crease. It would be applied to throwing in 1816.
- Lord's Old Ground, home of Marylebone Cricket Club (MCC), had become the accepted venue for all great matches and it was the ambition of every aspiring cricketer to play there. But Lord's was already losing its rural character as London expanded and began to surround it. The landlord, Mr Portman, felt able to increase the rent and so Thomas Lord decided to seek another venue. The lease on the "Old Ground" was due to expire on Lady Day in 1810 but Lord moved fast and, by May 1809, had secured a lease on another plot of land, part of the St John's Wood estate which belonged to the Eyre family. He opened this "Middle Ground" in time for the 1809 season but MCC at first refused to relocate and continued to play at the Old Ground until the winter of 1810–11 when Lord staged a fait accompli by literally seizing "his turf" which was dug up and moved to the Middle Ground.
- John Sherman made his debut. His career continued to 1852 and is the joint-longest on record, equalled only by W. G. Grace from 1865 to 1908.
- With the Napoleonic War continuing, loss of investment and manpower impacted cricket and only eight matches have been recorded in 1809:
  - 1–3 June – MCC v England @ Lord's Old Ground
  - 13–16 June – MCC v England @ Lord's Old Ground
  - 27–29 June – England v Surrey @ Lord's Old Ground
  - 11–13 July – Surrey v England @ Holt Pound, Farnham
  - 17–20 July – England v Four Chosen & Seven Others @ Lord's Old Ground
  - 22–24 August – England v Surrey @ Bowman's Lodge, Dartford
  - 5–7 September – England v Surrey @ Lord's Old Ground
  - 20–22 September – Lord F Beauclerk's XI v FC Ladbroke's XI @ Lord's Old Ground

== Bibliography ==
- ACS (1981). A Guide to Important Cricket Matches Played in the British Isles 1709–1863. Nottingham: ACS. OCLC 85045528.
- Haygarth, Arthur (1996) [1862]. Scores & Biographies, Volume 1 (1744–1826). Kennington: Frederick Lillywhite. ISBN 978-19-00592-23-9.
- Warner, Pelham (1946). Lords: 1787–1945. London: Harrap. OCLC 877106024.
