= Sherm =

Sherm is a shortened version of the given name Sherman and may refer to:

== People ==
- Sherm Chavoor (1919-1992), American swimming coach
- Sherm Cohen (born 1965), American storyboard artist
- Sherm Feller (1918–1994), American musician and sports announcer
- Sherm Lollar (1924–1977), American Major League Baseball player (catcher)
- Sherm Poppen (1930–2019), American engineer and inventor

== Media ==
- Sherm, a tank enemy seen in the video game, Super Mario Odyssey
- Sherm, a character seen in the TV series, SpongeBob SquarePants

== Other uses ==
- Slang for Nat Sherman, an American tobacco brand, named for its founder
  - "sherm stick", a cigarette or joint soaked in PCP (see Phencyclidine#Recreational uses)

== See also ==
- Society for Human Resource Management (SHRM, pronounced as "sherm")
