= Sicherman =

Sicherman is a surname. Notable people with the surname include:

- Barbara Sicherman (fl. 1980), American Historian
- George Sicherman (fl. 1970s), inventor of the Sicherman dice
- Harvey Sicherman (1945–2010), American writer and foreign policy expert

== See also ==
- Scherman
