= Edwin George Hastings =

American professor (1872–1953)

Edwin George Hastings (August 11, 1872, Ashtabula County, Ohio – September 29, 1953, Orlando, Florida) was an American professor of agricultural bacteriology, known for his work with Harry Luman Russell on bovine tuberculosis and applications of the tuberculin test to herds of cattle. Hastings was the president in 1923 of the American Society for Microbiology.

== Biography ==
Born on a farm near Austinburg, Ohio, Edwin George Hastings graduated in 1898 with a B.S. from Ohio State University. At the University of Wisconsin–Madison he graduated in 1899 with an M.S. His M.S. thesis is entitled A study of the action of various types of bacteria upon the nitrogenous constituents of milk. In 1901 and 1902 he studied at the Faculty of Veterinary Medicine of the Ludwig-Maximilians-Universität München (LMU). Upon his return to the US, he married Elva J. Waters. At the University of Wisconsin–Madison, Edwin G. Hastings was an instructor from 1902 to 1905, an assistant professor from 1905 to 1909, an associate professor from 1909 to 1913, and a full professor of agricultural bacteriology from 1913 to 1942, when he retired as professor emeritus. From 1913 to 1942 he also chaired his department and held an appointment as a bacteriologist at the University of Wisconsin Agricultural Experiment Station. He served as an associate editor for the Journal of Bacteriology and the Journal of Dairy Science.

Paratuberculosis (Johne's disease) is a chronic infectious disease of cattle. In 1909 Bernhard Bang reported the testing of cattle by means of subcutaneous administration of avian tuberculin. He found the testing was successful for many cattle infected with paratuberculosis. Working with the United States Bureau of Animal Industry, Hastings was among the first scientists in the USA to isolate the causative organism of paratuberculosis and to manufacture and apply johnin in testing cattle for paratuberculosis.

Hastings and his colleagues did important work in improving the quality of cow's milk and cheese for human consumption. His research with Harry Luman Russell on the heat resistance of Mycobacterium bovis helped to establish standards for pasteurization of milk. Hastings promoted the "preparation and distribution of tuberculin, johnin, root-nodule bacteria, cheese cultures, and Bang's antigen".

In 1910 Hastings was elected a fellow of the American Association for the Advancement of Science. His presidential address to the American Society of Microbiology was given on December 29, 1923. In 1942 Ohio State University awarded him an honorary doctorate.

His doctoral students include James Morgan Sherman.

== Selected publications ==
- Russell, Harry Luman; Hastings, Edwin George (February 1906). Distribution of Tuberculosis in Suspected and Non-Suspected Herds in Wisconsin. Vol. 133. University of Wisconsin, Agricultural Experiment Station. pp. 1–14.
- Russell, Harry Luman; ——— (1905). A Swiss Cheese Trouble Caused by a Gas-forming Yeast.
- Farrington, Edward Holyoke; ——— (1907). The Pasteurization and the Inspection of Creamery and Cheese Factory By-products.
- Russell, Harry Luman; ——— (1909). Agricultural Bacteriology.
- ———; Evans, Alice C.; Hart, Edwin Bret (1912). The Bacteriology of Cheddar Cheese.
- ———; Evans, Alice Catherine; Hart, Edwin Bret (1912). Studies on the Factors Concerned in the Ripening of Cheddar Cheese.
- ———; Halpin, James Garfield (1913). Avian Tuberculosis.
- ——— (1914). What Has Been Done with the Tuberculin Test in Wisconsin.
- Russell, Harry Luman; ——— (1920). Outlines of Dairy Bacteriology: A Concise Manual for the Use of Students in Dairying (11th ed.). H.L. Russell.
- Peterson, William Harold; ———; Fred, Edwin Broun (1925). A Study of the Principal Changes which Take Place in the Making of Silage.
