= General Sherman (disambiguation) =

General William Tecumseh Sherman (1820–1891) was a leading US Civil War general.

General Sherman may also refer to:

== People ==
- Francis Trowbridge Sherman (1825–1905), Union general in the American Civil War
- Sidney Sherman (1805–1873), Texas Army general
- Thomas W. Sherman (1813–1879), Union general during the American Civil War

== Other uses ==
- General Sherman Tree, a giant sequoia tree
- USS General Sherman, a Union Navy Civil War gunboat
- SS General Sherman, an American merchant ship destroyed in the 1866 General Sherman incident

== See also ==
- Attorney General Sherman (disambiguation)
