= Justice Sherman =

Justice Sherman may refer to:

- Charles Robert Sherman (1788–1829), justice of the Ohio Supreme Court
- Edgar J. Sherman (1834–1914), associate justice of the Massachusetts Superior Court
- Henry Sherman (1808–1879), Chief Justice of the New Mexico Territory
- Henry L. Sherman (1870–1933), justice of the New York Supreme Court in New York County and of the New York State Supreme Court, Appellate Division
- Roger Sherman (1721–1793), justice of the Superior Court of Connecticut and a Founding Father of the United States

== See also ==
- Judge Sherman (disambiguation)
