= Bouldering =

Form of rock climbing

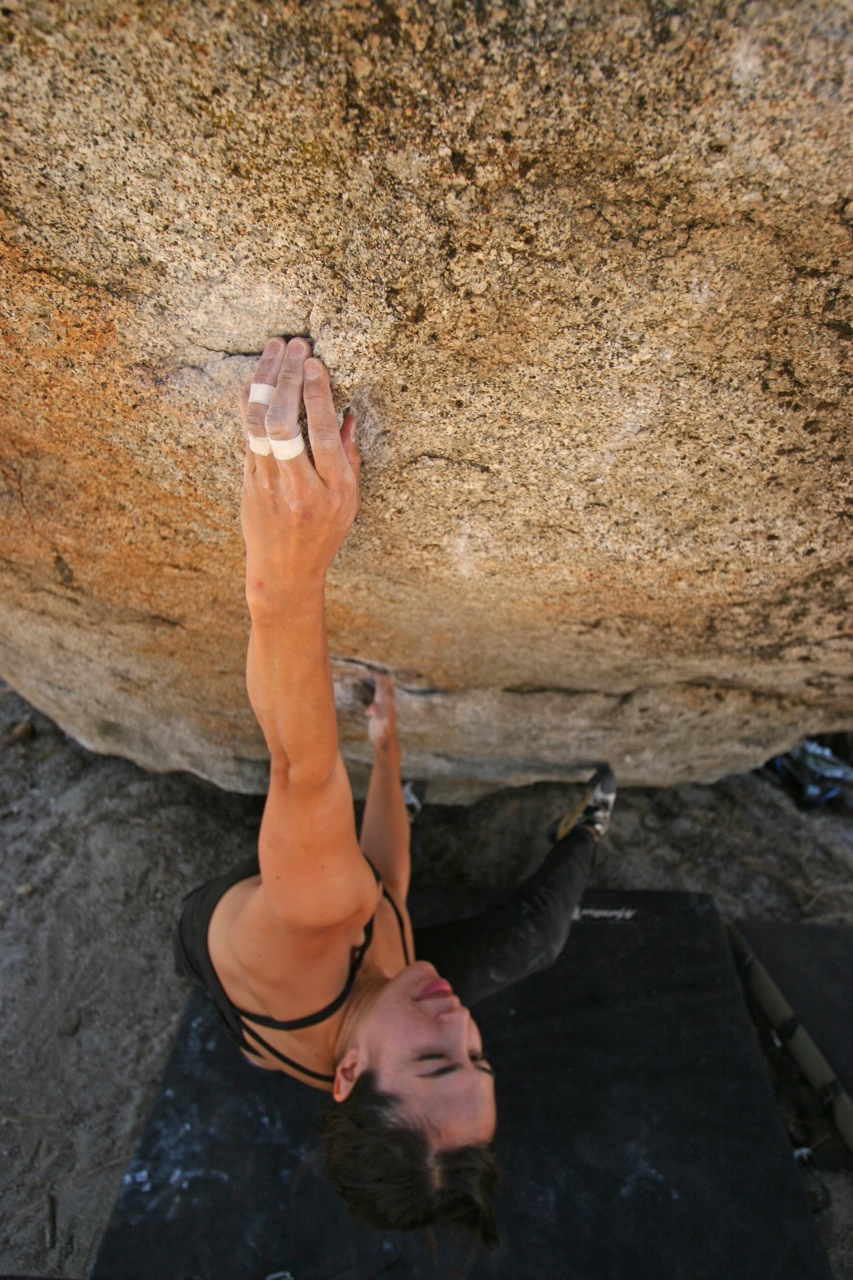
Bouldering in Idyllwild, California

Bouldering is a form of rock climbing that is performed on small rock formations or artificial rock walls without the use of ropes or harnesses. While bouldering can be done without any equipment, most climbers use climbing shoes to help secure footholds, chalk to keep their hands dry and to provide a firmer grip, and bouldering mats to prevent injuries from falls. Unlike free solo climbing, which is also performed without ropes, bouldering problems (the sequence of moves that a climber performs to complete the climb) are usually less than six metres (20 ft) tall. Traverses, which are a form of boulder problem, require the climber to climb horizontally from one end to another. Artificial climbing walls allow boulderers to climb indoors in areas without natural boulders. Bouldering competitions take place in both indoor and outdoor settings.

The sport was originally a method of training for roped climbs and mountaineering, so climbers could practice specific moves at a safe distance from the ground. Additionally, the sport served to build stamina and increase finger strength. During the 20th century, bouldering evolved into a separate discipline. Individual problems are assigned ratings based on difficulty. Although there have been various rating systems used throughout the history of bouldering, modern problems usually use either the V-scale or the Fontainebleau scale.

== Outdoor bouldering ==
Bouldering in Hueco Tanks: Baby Martini (V6)

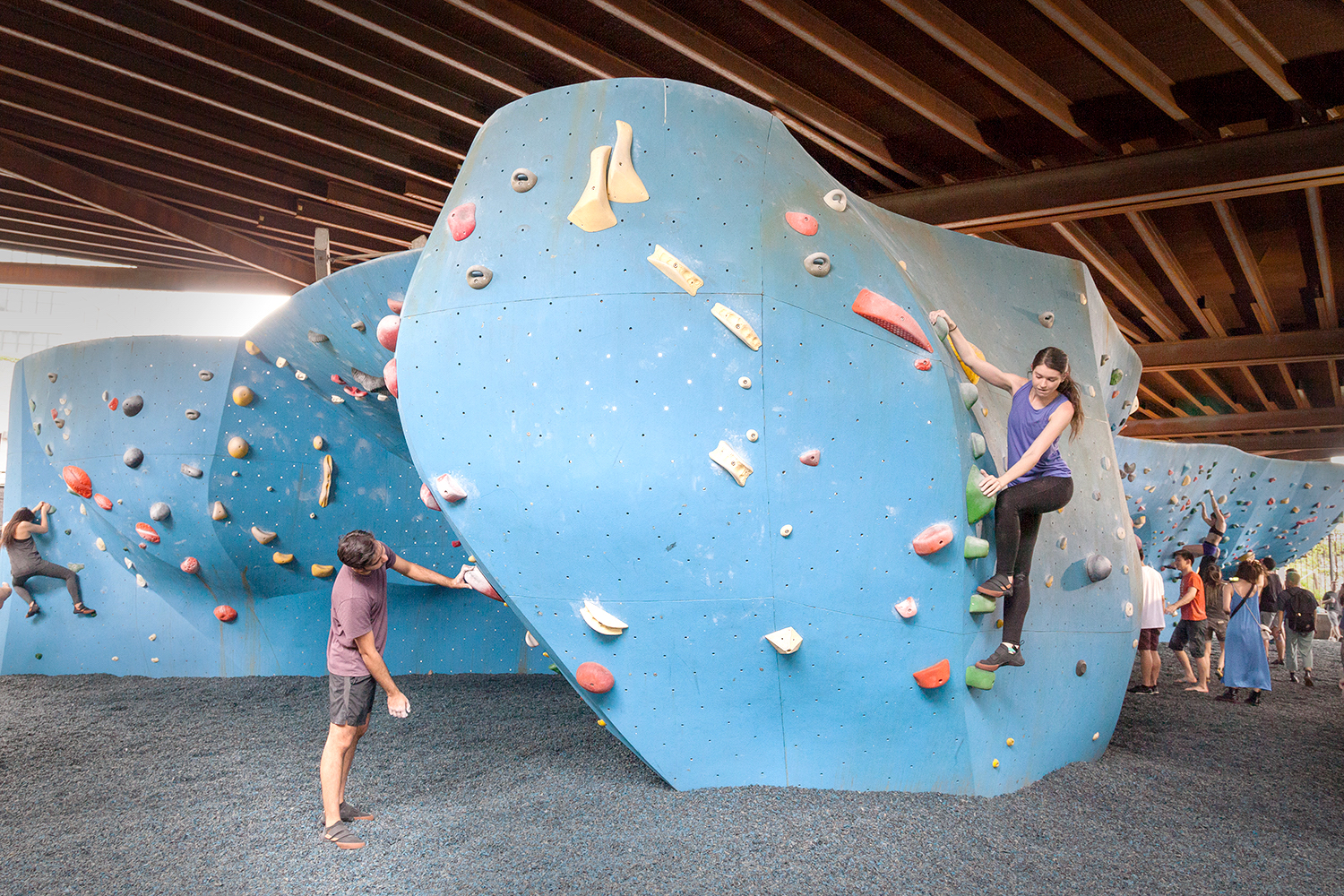
The largest outdoor bouldering gym in North America, The Cliffs at DUMBO, is located in Brooklyn Bridge Park.

The characteristics of boulder problems depend largely on the type of rock being climbed. For example, granite often features long cracks and slabs while sandstone rocks are known for their steep overhangs and frequent horizontal breaks. Limestone and volcanic rock are also used for bouldering.

There are many prominent bouldering areas throughout the United States, including Hueco Tanks in Texas, Mount Blue Sky in Colorado, The Appalachian Mountains in the Eastern United States, and The Buttermilks in Bishop, California. Squamish, British Columbia, is one of the most popular bouldering areas in Canada. Europe is also home to a number of bouldering sites, such as Fontainebleau in France, Meschia in Italy, Albarracín in Spain, and various mountains throughout Switzerland. Rocklands, South Africa is an additional notable site, one of the most popular in the world.

== Indoor bouldering ==
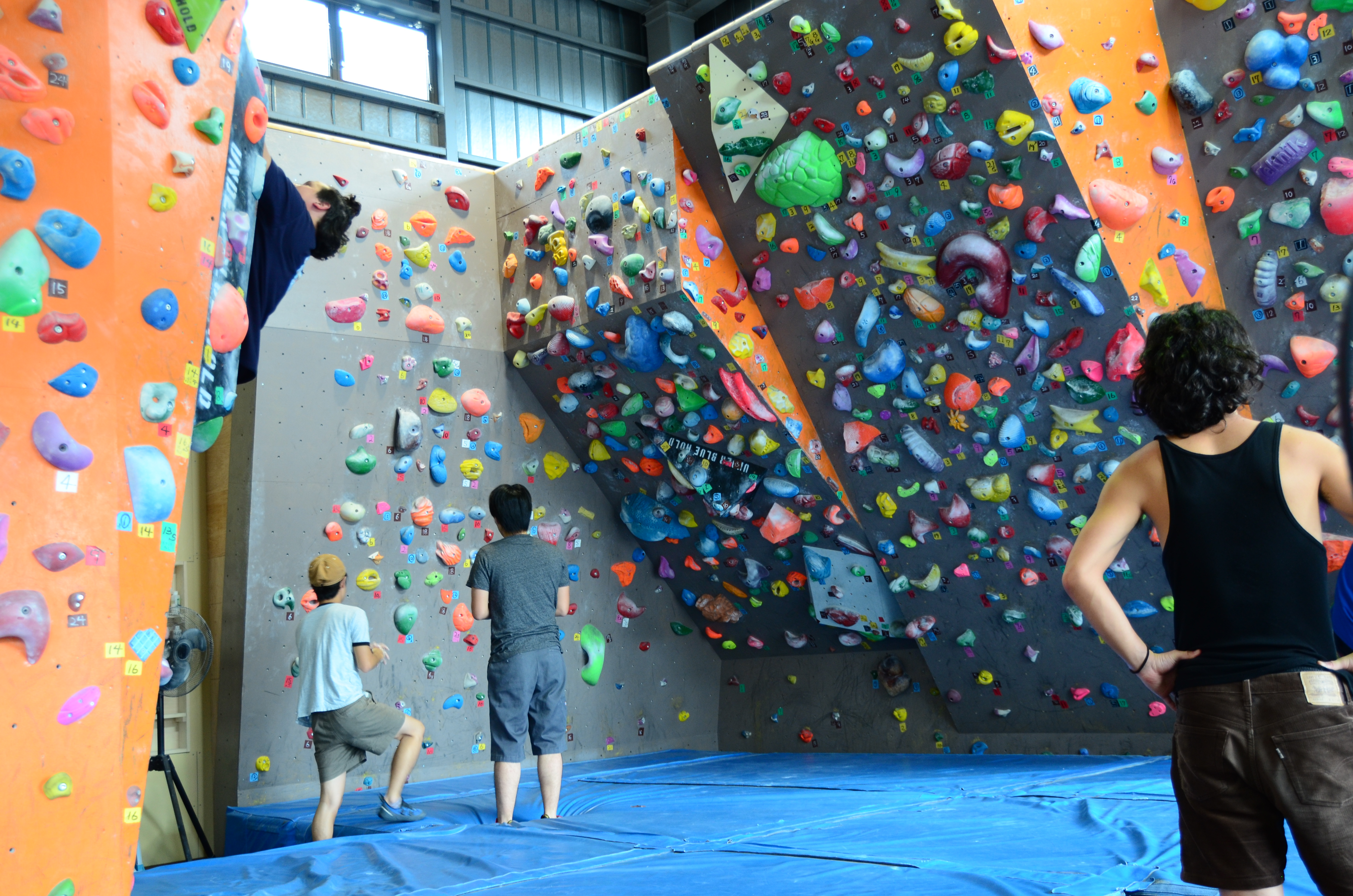
An indoor bouldering gym

Artificial climbing walls are used to simulate boulder problems in an indoor environment, usually at climbing gyms. These walls are constructed with wooden panels, polymer cement panels, concrete shells, or precast molds of actual rock walls. Holds, usually made of plastic, are then bolted onto the wall to create problems, or a sequence of bouldering moves to be overcome. Some problems use steep overhanging surfaces which force the climber to support much of their weight using their upper body strength.

Climbing gyms often feature multiple problems within the same section of wall. Historically, the most common method route-setters used to designate the intended problem was by placing colored tape next to each hold. For example, red tape would indicate one bouldering problem while green tape would be used to set a different problem in the same area. Indoor bouldering requires very little in terms of equipment: at minimum, climbing shoes; at maximum, a chalk bag, chalk, a brush, and climbing shoes.

== Grading ==
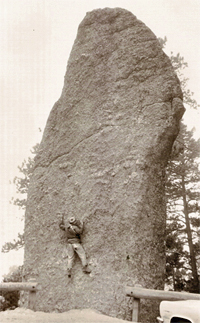
Climber on the Thimble in Custer State Park in South Dakota during the 1960s

A climber completing an indoor V3 problem

Bouldering problems are assigned numerical difficulty ratings by route-setters and climbers. The two most widely used rating systems are the V-scale and the Fontainebleau system.

The V-scale (also known as the "Hueco" scale), which originated in the United States, is an open-ended rating system with higher numbers indicating a higher degree of difficulty. The V1 rating indicates that a problem can be completed by a novice climber in good physical condition after several attempts. The scale begins at V0, and as of 2024, the highest V rating that has been assigned to a bouldering problem is V17. Some climbing gyms also use a VB grade to indicate beginner problems.

The Fontainebleau scale follows a similar system, with each numerical grade divided into three ratings with the letters a, b, and c. For example, Fontainebleau 7A roughly corresponds with V6, while Fontainebleau 7C+ is equivalent to V10. In both systems, grades are further differentiated by appending "+" to indicate a small increase in difficulty. Despite this level of specificity, ratings of individual problems are often controversial, as ability level is not the only factor that affects how difficult a problem may be for a particular climber. Height, arm length, flexibility, and other body characteristics can also affect difficulty.

== Highball bouldering ==
Highball bouldering is "a sub-discipline of bouldering in which climbers seek out tall, imposing lines to climb ropeless above crash pads." It may have begun in 1961 when John Gill, without top-rope rehearsal or bouldering pads (which did not yet exist), climbed a steep face on an 11.5 m (37 ft) granite spire called The Thimble. In 2002 Jason Kehl completed the first highball at double-digit V-difficulty, called Evilution, a 17 m (55 ft) boulder in the Buttermilks of California, earning the grade of V12.

Important milestone ascents in this style include:

- Ambrosia, V11, a 17 m (55 ft) boulder in Bishop, California, climbed by Kevin Jorgeson in 2015.
- Too Big to Flail, V10, another 17 m (55 ft) line in Bishop, California, climbed by Alex Honnold in 2016.
- The Process, V16, a 17 m (55 ft) boulder in Bishop, California, first climbed by Daniel Woods in 2015.

== Competition bouldering ==
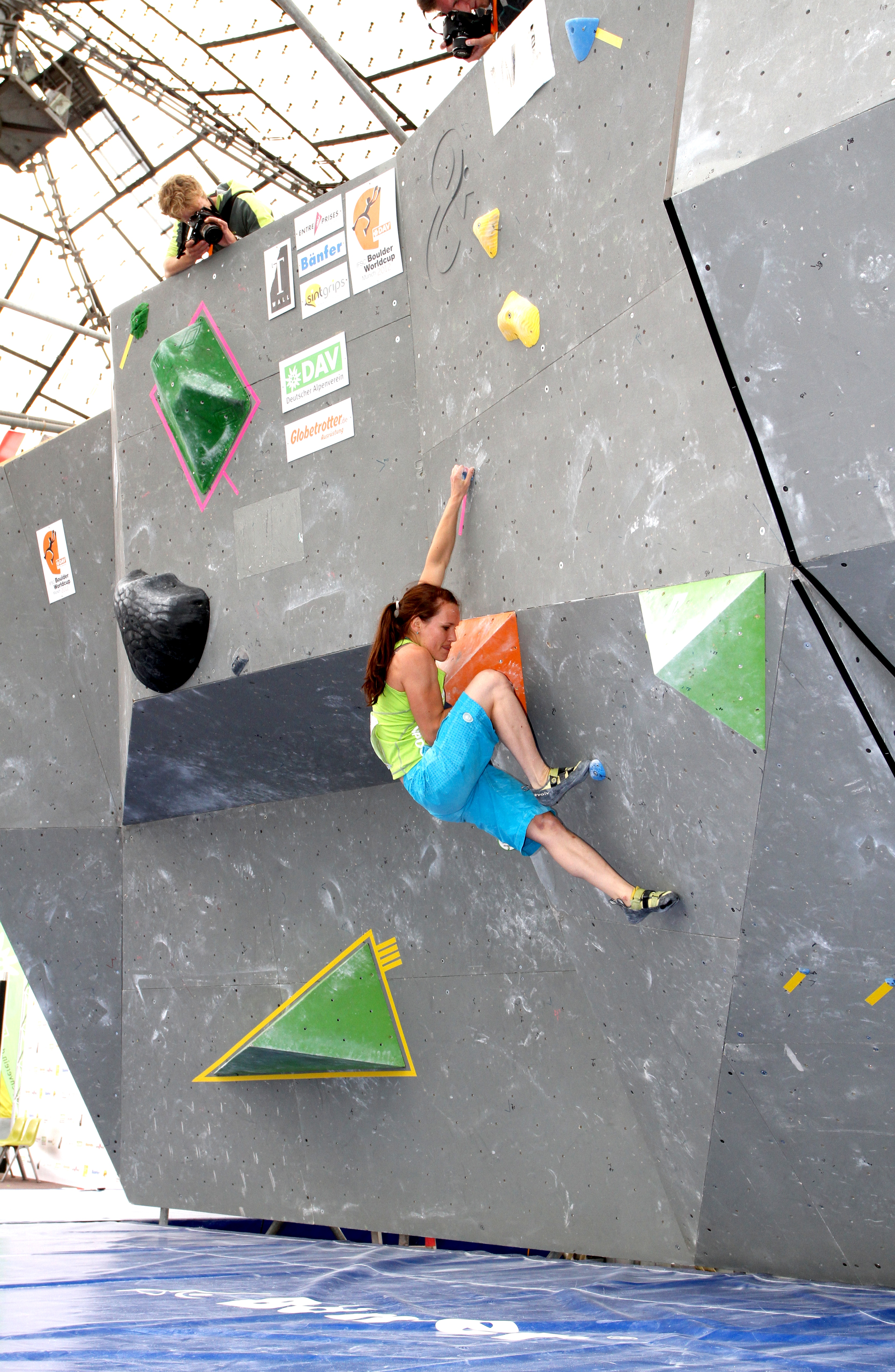
A competitor at a Boulder World Cup in 2012

World Climbing employs an indoor format (although competitions can also take place in an outdoor setting) that breaks the competition into three rounds: qualifications, semi-finals, and finals. The rounds feature different sets of four to six boulder problems, and each competitor has a fixed amount of time to attempt each problem. At the end of each round, competitors are ranked by the number of completed problems with ties settled by the total number of attempts taken to solve the problems.

Some competitions only permit climbers a fixed number of attempts at each problem with a timed rest period in between. In an open-format competition, all climbers compete simultaneously, and are given a fixed amount of time to complete as many problems as possible. More points are awarded for more difficult problems, while points are deducted for multiple attempts on the same problem.

In 2012, the federation, then known as the International Federation of Sport Climbing, submitted a proposal to the International Olympic Committee (IOC) to include lead climbing in the 2020 Summer Olympics. The proposal was later revised to an "overall" competition, which would feature bouldering, lead climbing, and speed climbing. In 2016, the International Olympic Committee (IOC) officially approved climbing, along with four other sports, as an Olympic sport, based on their "impact on gender equality, the youth appeal of the sports and the legacy value of adding them to the Tokyo Games".

== History ==
=== Modern bouldering ===
Modern recreational climbing began in the late 19th century in England, southeastern Germany, northern Italy, and France. Bouldering on the rocks of Fontainebleau outside of Paris began in the late 1800s, with the first guidebook written by Maurice Martin in 1945. Bouldering as training or a recreational past-time began also in the late 1800s in England and perhaps elsewhere. Oscar Eckenstein was an early proponent.

In the late 1950s, John Gill, who is frequently called "the father of modern bouldering", combined gymnastics with rock climbing, and felt that the best place to do that was on boulders or small outcrops. He developed a rating system that was closed-ended: B1 problems were as difficult as the most challenging roped routes of the time, B2 problems were more difficult, and B3 problems had been completed once. He also introduced chalk as a method of keeping the climber's hands dry, promoted a dynamic climbing style, and emphasized the importance of strength training to complement skill. His 1969 article in the Journal of the American Alpine Club entitled "The Art of Bouldering" defines modern bouldering. As Gill improved in ability and influence, his ideas became the norm.

In the 1980s, two important training tools emerged. One important training tool was bouldering mats, also referred to as "crash pads", which protected against injuries from falling and enabled boulderers to climb in areas that would have been too dangerous otherwise. The second important tool was indoor climbing walls, which helped spread the sport to areas without outdoor climbing and allowed serious climbers to train year-round. As the sport grew in popularity, new bouldering areas were developed throughout Europe and the United States, and more athletes began participating in bouldering competitions. The visibility of the sport greatly increased in the early 2000s, as YouTube videos and climbing blogs helped boulderers around the world to quickly learn techniques, find hard problems, and announce newly completed projects.

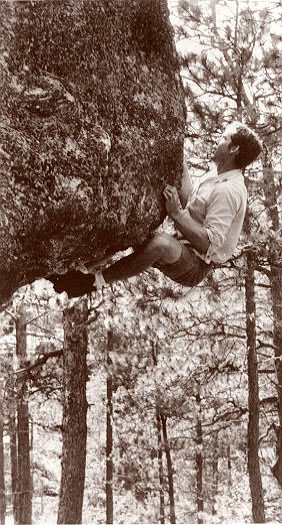
John Gill on the Scab in the Needles of the Black Hills, 1963

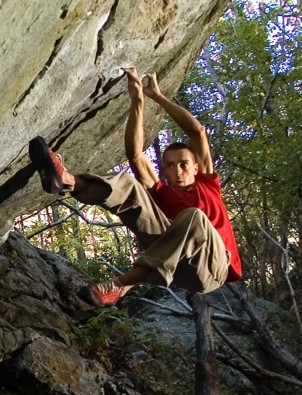
Christian Core on Gioia (Varazze, ITA), first 8C+ (V16) boulder in history, 2008

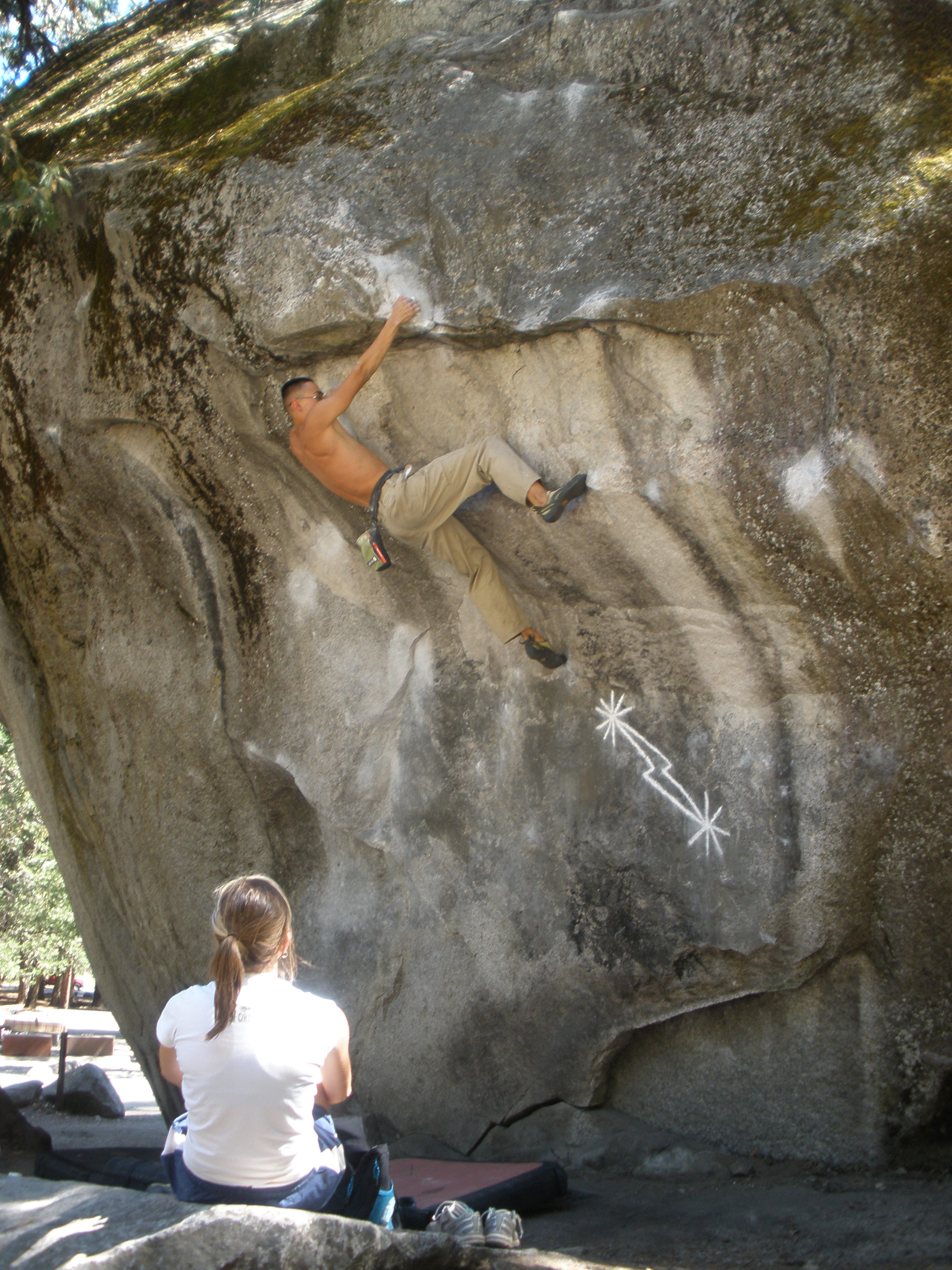
Michael Rael Armas on Midnight Lightning, Camp 4 (Yosemite National Park, US), one of the world's most famous bouldering problems

=== Notable ascents ===
Notable boulder climbs are chronicled by the climbing media to track progress in boulder climbing standards and levels of technical difficulty; in contrast, the hardest traditional climbing routes tend to be of lower technical difficulty due to the additional burden of having to place protection during the course of the climb, and due to the lack of any possibility of using natural protection on the most extreme climbs.

As of February 2026, there exists one proposed 9A+ (V18), Exodia, by Elias Iagnemma, and fourteen 9A (V17) boulders, ten of which have been repeated by at least one other climber. There are a number of routes with a confirmed climbing grade of 8C+ (V16), the first of which was Gioia by Christian Core in 2008 (and confirmed by Adam Ondra in 2011). As of December 2021, female climbers Josune Bereziartu, Ashima Shiraishi, and Kaddi Lehmann have repeated boulder problems at the 8C (V15) boulder grade. On 28 July 2023, Katie Lamb became the first female climber to climb an 8C+ (V16)-rated boulder by repeating Box Therapy at Rocky Mountain National Park. However, after Brooke Raboutou repeated the climb In October 2023, the boulder was ultimately downgraded to 8C (V15).

== Equipment ==
Unlike other climbing sports, bouldering can be performed safely and effectively with very little equipment, an aspect which makes the discipline highly appealing, but opinions differ. While bouldering pioneer John Sherman asserted that "The only gear really needed to go bouldering is boulders," others suggest the use of climbing shoes and a chalkbag – a small pouch where ground-up chalk is kept – as the bare minimum, and more experienced boulderers typically bring multiple pairs of climbing shoes, chalk, brushes, crash pads, and a skincare kit.

Climbing shoes have the most direct impact on performance. Besides protecting the climber's feet from rough surfaces, climbing shoes are designed to help the climber secure footholds. Climbing shoes typically fit much tighter than other athletic footwear and often curl the toes downwards to enable precise footwork. They are manufactured in a variety of different styles to perform in different situations. Stiffer shoes excel at securing small edges, whereas softer shoes provide greater sensitivity. The front of the shoe, called the "toe box", can be asymmetric, which performs well on overhanging rocks, or symmetric, which is better suited for vertical problems and slabs.

To absorb sweat, most boulderers use gymnastics chalk on their hands, stored in a chalk bag, which can be tied around the waist (also called sport climbing chalk bags), allowing the climber to reapply chalk during the climb. There are also versions of floor chalk bags (also called bouldering chalk bags), which are usually bigger than sport climbing chalk bags and are meant to be kept on the floor while climbing; this is because boulders do not usually have so many movements as to require chalking up more than once. Different sizes of brushes are used to remove excess chalk and debris from boulders in between climbs; they are often attached to the end of a long straight object in order to reach higher holds. Crash pads, also referred to as bouldering mats, are foam cushions placed on the ground to protect climbers from injury after falling.

Boulder problems are generally shorter than 6 m (20 ft) from ground to top. This makes the sport significantly safer than free solo climbing, which is also performed without ropes, but with no upper limit on the height of the climb. However, minor injuries are common in bouldering, particularly sprained ankles and wrists. To prevent injuries, boulderers position crash pads near the boulder to provide a softer landing, as well as one or more spotters to help redirect the climber towards the pads. Upon landing, boulderers employ falling techniques similar to those used in gymnastics: spreading the impact across the entire body to avoid bone fractures and positioning limbs to allow joints to move freely throughout the impact.

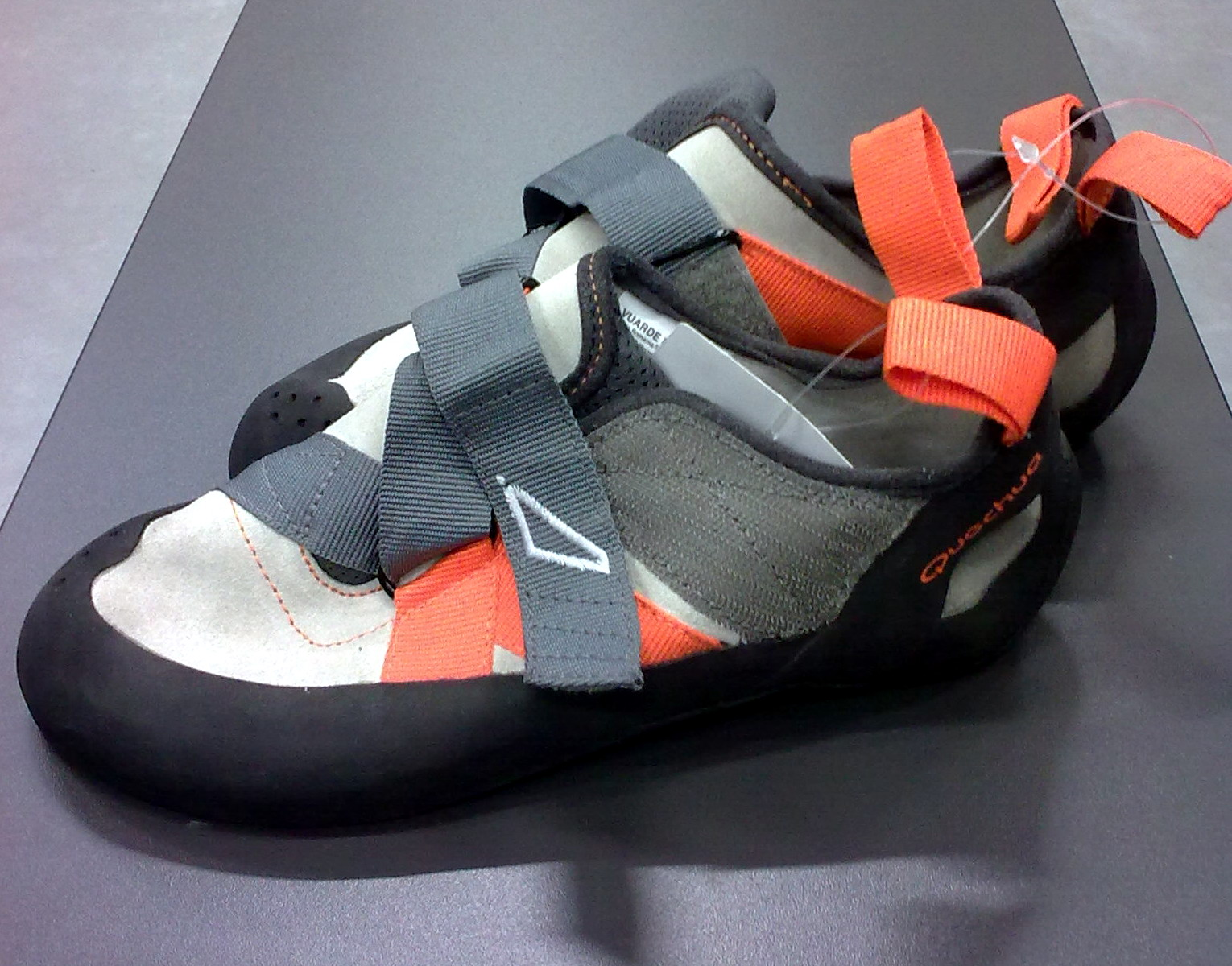
A modern climbing shoe

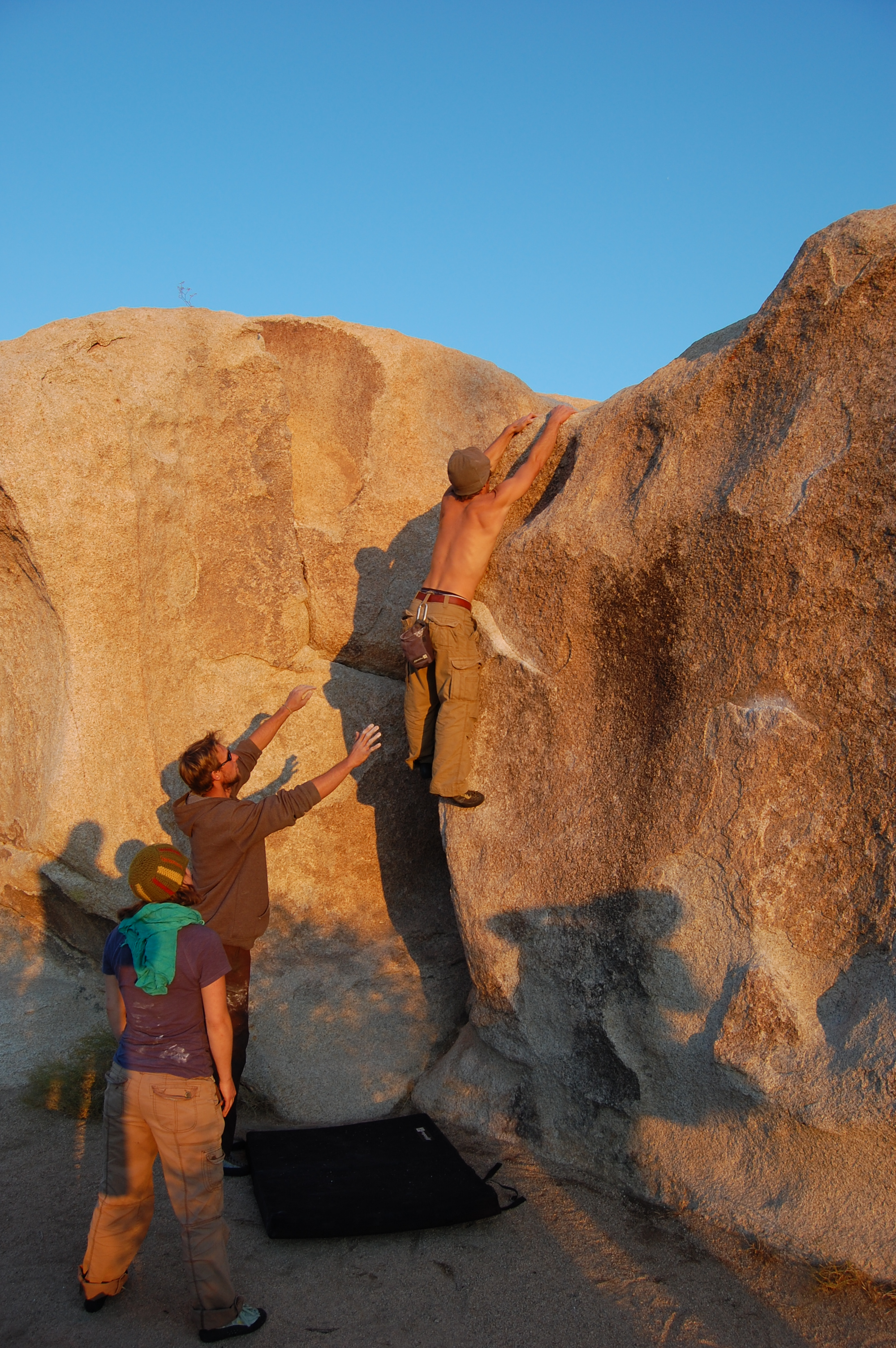
Using spotters for safety

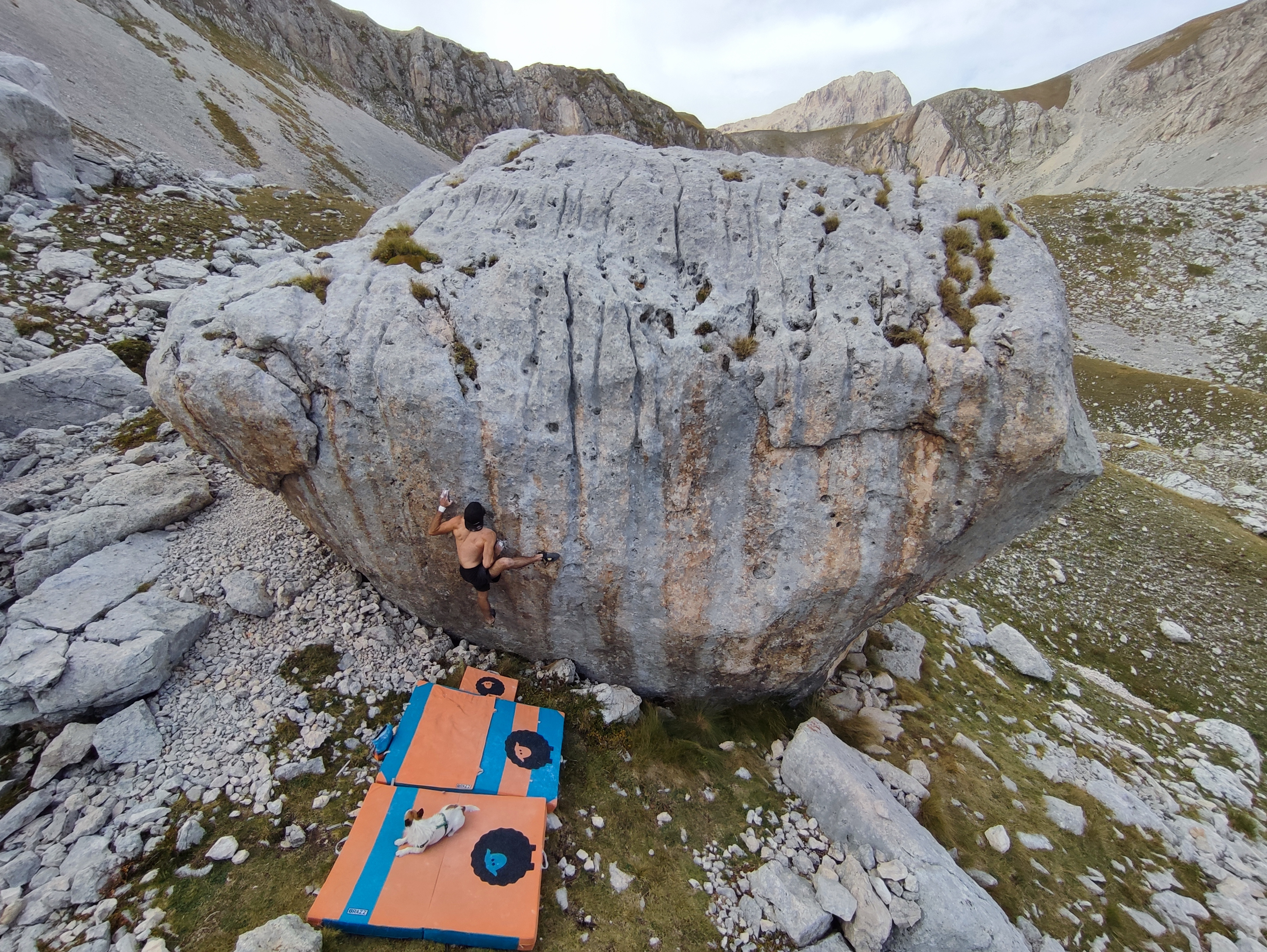
Using crash pads

== Techniques ==
Although every type of rock climbing requires a high level of strength and technique, bouldering is the most dynamic form of the sport, requiring the highest level of power and placing considerable strain on the body. Training routines that strengthen fingers and forearms are useful in preventing injuries such as tendonitis and ruptured ligaments. However, as with other forms of climbing, bouldering technique begins with proper footwork. Leg muscles are significantly stronger than arm muscles; thus, proficient boulderers use their arms to maintain balance and body positioning as much as possible, relying on their legs to push them up the rock. Boulderers also keep their arms straight with their shoulders engaged whenever feasible, allowing their bones to support their body weight rather than their muscles.

Bouldering movements are described as either "static" or "dynamic". Static movements are those that are performed slowly, with the climber's position controlled by maintaining contact on the boulder with the other three limbs. Dynamic movements use the climber's momentum to reach holds that would be difficult or impossible to secure statically, with an increased risk of falling if the movement is not performed accurately.

== Injuries and risks ==
As with any other sport, bouldering comes with inherit health risks. Bouldering risks can be split up into the upper and lower region of the body. For the upper region: uneven distribution of load on the fingers can cause the most common injury: a pulley injury. Pulleys keep the tendons close to the bone, like a ring, a pulley injury can strain or partially rupture the pulley, leading to swelling. Skin injuries, more common outdoors, typically come from slipping off the rock uncontrollably and ripping multiple layers of skin, leading to bleeding. Other arm injuries include tendonitis, and elbow and wrist sprains (from an improper fall). Some lower region injuries commonly include ankle sprains and fractures (from a poor or mistimed fall). In general, most bouldering-related injuries rarely require surgical work and can be remedied through careful recovery and physical therapy. A unique challenge to outdoor bouldering is the lack of floor and obstacle coverage, as opposed to an indoor gym that has large mats. Landing on an uncovered area can lead to more severe injuries.

Climbers typically use climbing tape to help cover thin skin or help stabilize pulley injuries. Many methods exist for supporting injuries such as "X-taping" or "H-taping". Although studies are inconclusive and do not support the idea that taping can enhance or increase grip strength and finger endurance.

== Environmental impact ==
Bouldering can damage vegetation that grows on rocks, such as moss and lichens. This can occur as a result of the climber intentionally cleaning the boulder, or unintentionally from repeated use of handholds and footholds. Vegetation on the ground surrounding the boulder can also be damaged from overuse, particularly by climbers laying down crash pads. Soil erosion can occur when boulderers trample vegetation while hiking off of established trails, or when they unearth small rocks near the boulder in an effort to make the landing zone safer in case of a fall. Other environmental concerns include littering, improperly disposed feces, and graffiti. These issues have caused some land managers to prohibit bouldering, as was the case in Tea Garden, a popular bouldering area in Rocklands, South Africa.

== Difficulty ratings ==
In climbing gyms, the difficulty of a boulder is usually indicated by colors, while holds and footholds of the same color mark its path. This color coding does not follow overarching rules or a general standard, although some gyms have aligned their color grading with the circuits of the Fontainebleau bouldering area. For outdoor bouldering, the Fontainebleau and V scales are the two predominant grading systems worldwide.

== See also ==
- Competition climbing
- Free solo climbing
- Lead climbing

== Works cited ==
- [Access Fund] (2006). "Bouldering: Understanding and Managing Climbing on Small Rock Formations" (PDF). Access Fund. Archived from the original (PDF) on 29 October 2013.
- Ament, Pat; Gill, John (1998). John Gill: Master of Rock. Mechanicsburg, Pennsylvania: Stackpole Books.
- Beal, Peter (2011). Bouldering: Movement, Tactics, and Problem Solving. The Mountaineers Books. ISBN 9781594855016.
- Burbach, Matt (2004). Gym Climbing: Maximizing Your Indoor Experience. The Mountaineers Books. ISBN 9781594854804.
- Hill, Pete (2008). The Complete Guide to Climbing and Mountaineering. Cincinnati: David & Charles. ISBN 978-0715328446.
- Lourens, Tony (2005). Guide to Climbing. London: Stackpole Books. ISBN 9780811701525.
- Sherman, John (2001). Sherman Exposed. The Mountaineers Books. ISBN 9781594853968.
- Sherman, John (2017). Better Bouldering (3rd ed.). Guilford, Connecticut: Falcon Guides. ISBN 978-1493029273.
