= Bouldering mat =

Thick foam pad used for protection when bouldering

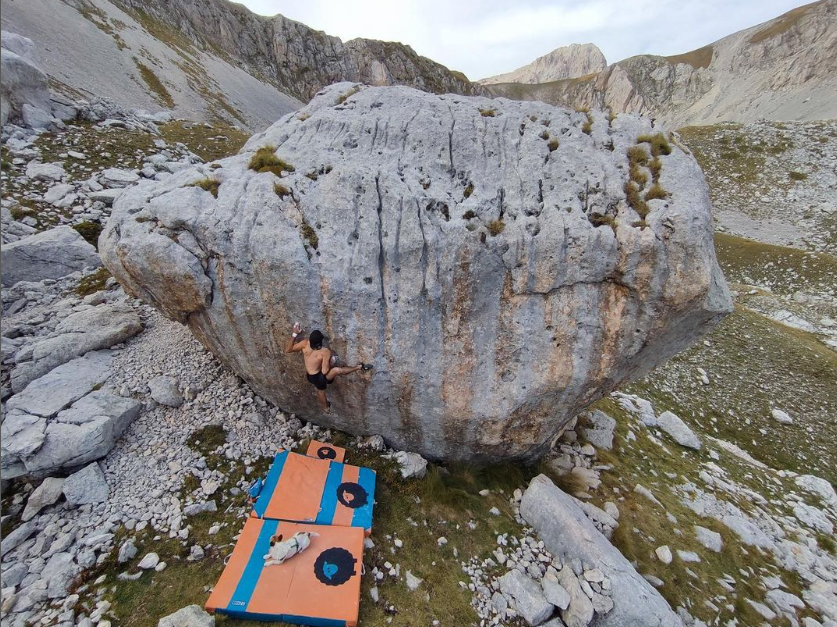
Boulderer with several crashpads

A bouldering mat or crashpad (also originally called the sketchpad) is a nylon-enclosed multi-layer foam pad used to give the climber a degree of protection when bouldering. Bouldering mats help prevent climbers from injuring themselves from the continuous and repeated falls onto hard or uneven surfaces that are associated with projecting a bouldering problem.

Some modern bouldering pads include a hinge so that the pad can be folded over into a more compact form for transportation (a 'hinge mat'), and some also come with shoulder straps, and even waist straps, for easier carrying of the mat to and from the bouldering area. The first commercially available bouldering mat, the "Kinnaloa Sketchpad", was designed and produced in 1992.

== Design ==
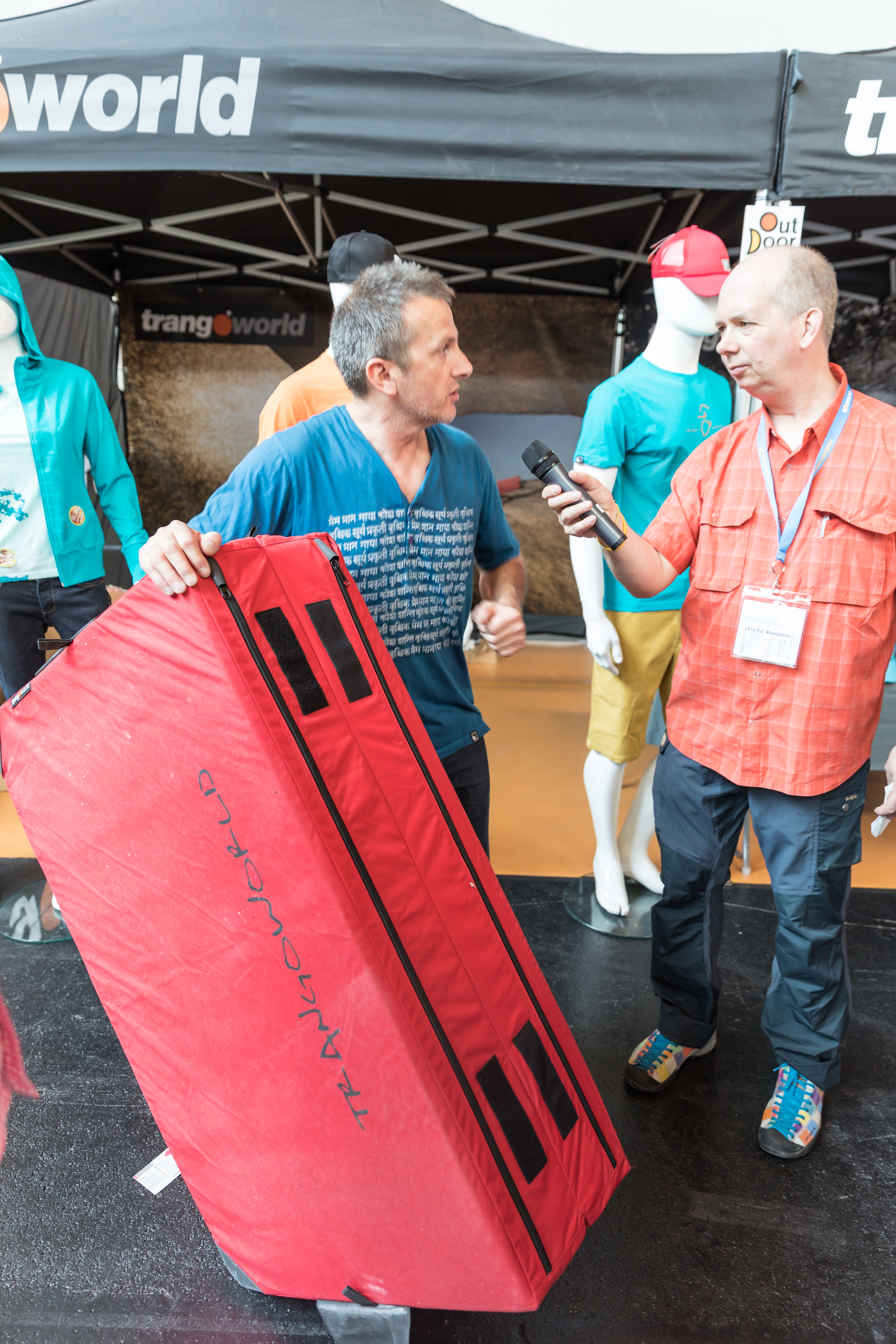
A 'hinge mat' that is folded in two

Modern mats are made in a wide range of sizes and styles (and colors) and can be up to 8–15 centimetres (3–6 in) in thickness, and up to 1 by 2 metres (3 by 7 ft) in surface area (at the larger end).

"Bi-fold" mats (and even "tri-fold" mats), allow the bouldering pad to be more easily transported to the bouldering area, however, the use of any "hinge" for easier folding introduces a point of weakness. The term 'taco mat' is a single-section foam pad that bends in the middle when folded but has no hinge ('burrito mats' fold in three), while 'hinge mats' have separate sections connected by a hinge.

Bouldering mats and crashpads typically have two or three different layers of polyurethane foam that are enclosed in a tough outer skin of typically 600 to 1000 denier nylon, or equivalent material like cordura. Softer 'open-celled' foam below firmer, higher-density 'closed-cell' foam will prevent a climber's foot from sinking through the foam and either impacting the ground or getting stuck in the mat, which would increase the chance of injury. The foam itself comes in various thicknesses, with smaller thinner mats used for sit starts, to cover gaps between larger mats, and/or to keep shoes clean and off the bare earth.

Modern bouldering mats—and particularly the larger ones—usually come with some form of shoulder straps, and even waist straps, so that the mats can be comfortably carried on the climber's back while hiking to and from the bouldering areas. Some mats also include pockets for storage or straps that allow climbers to turn the pad into a day-pack with their bouldering gear stuffed inside the folds.

== Use ==
Uses of bouldering mats/crashpads

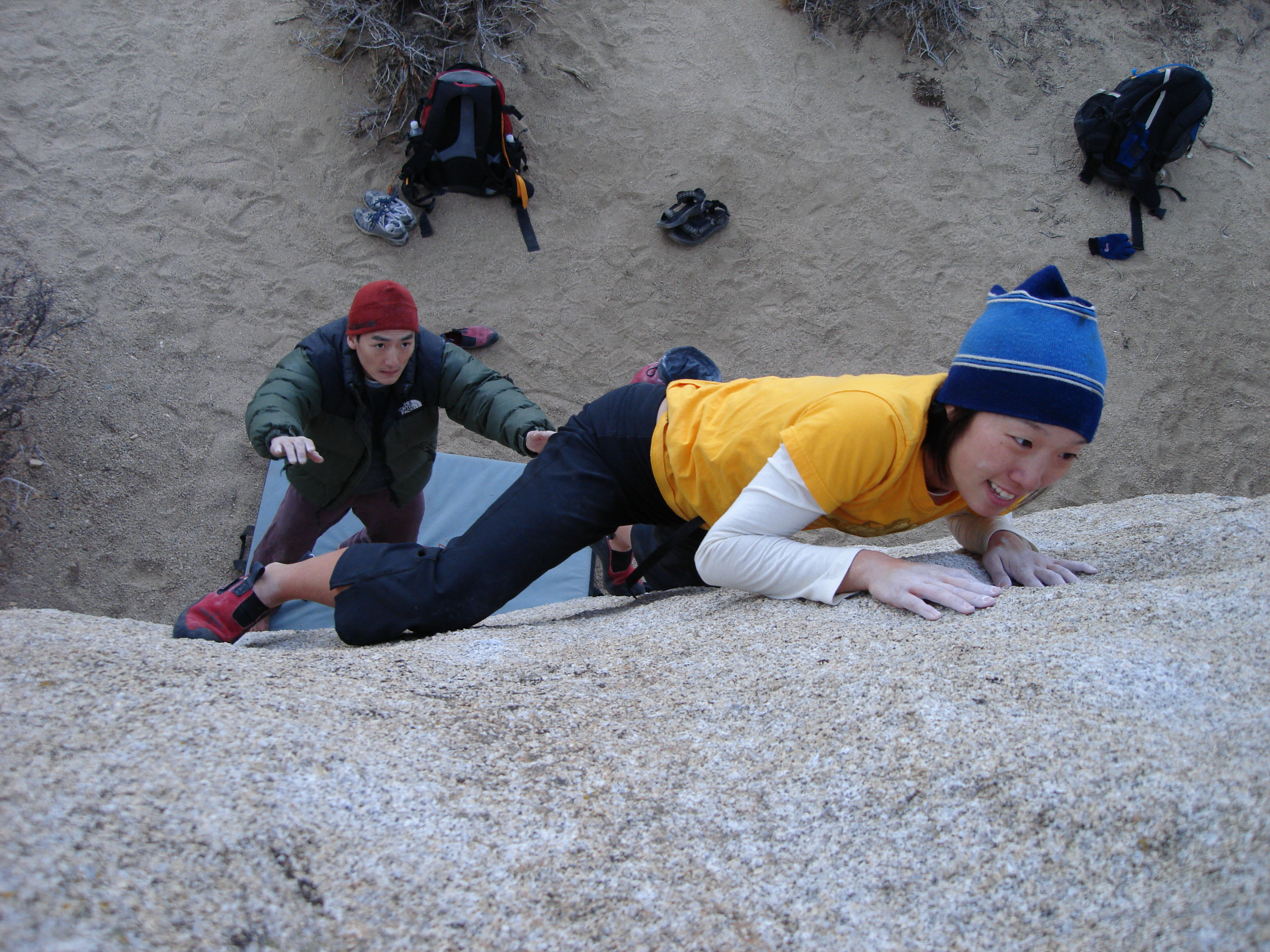
Spotter supporting the protection of the bouldering mat on a highball boulder

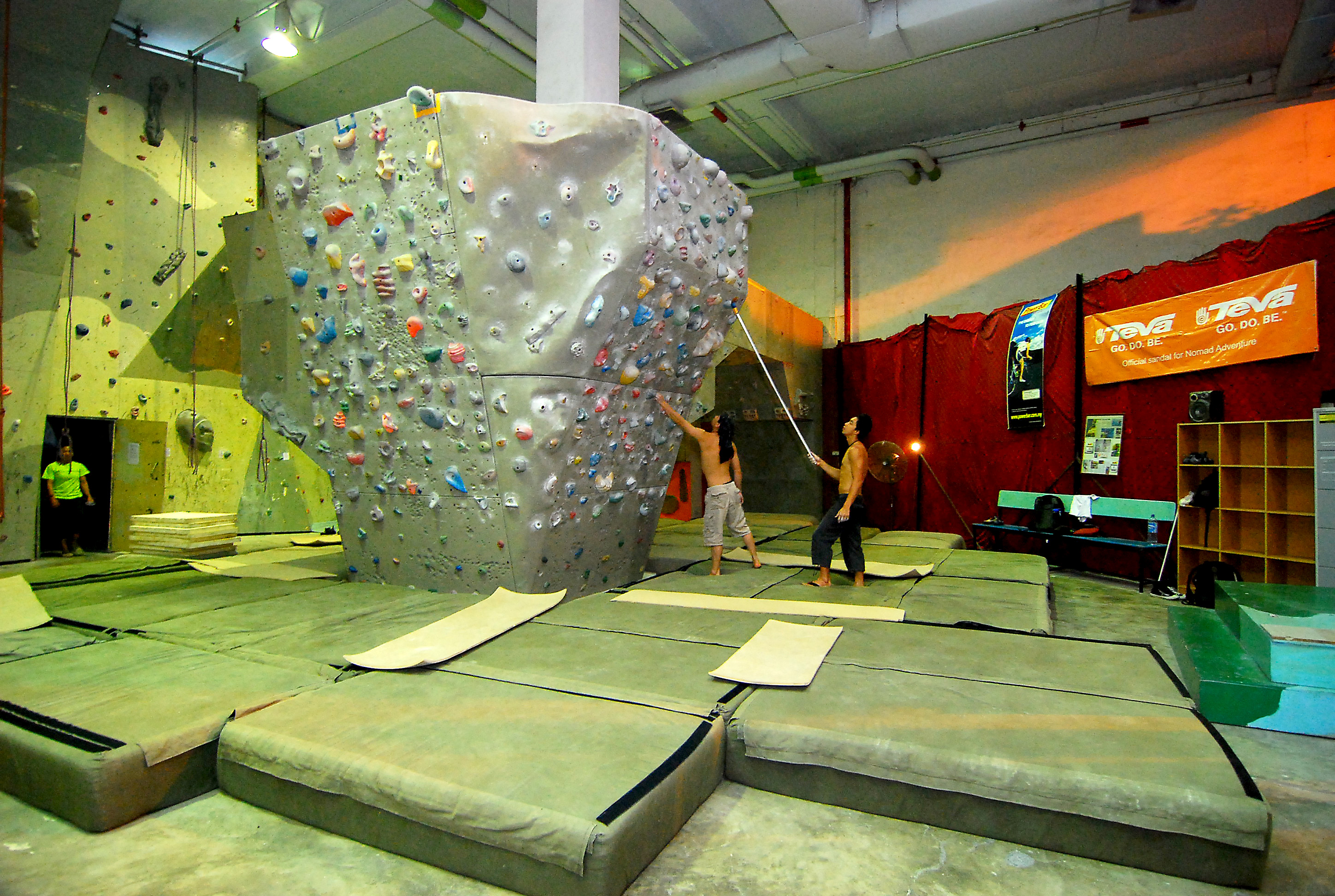
Indoor climbing walls make extensive use of pads and mats in bouldering areas for climber safety.

A unique aspect of bouldering is the general lack of any requirement for climbing protection equipment that is associated with most other forms of rock climbing, such as sport climbing or traditional climbing. While bouldering is essentially a free solo climbing format, the continuous and repeated falls associated with projecting a bouldering problem can damage the heel, ankles, shins (e.g. shin splints), and knees. Bouldering mats are particularly important where the ground is very hard, uneven, and/or the fall area is littered with rocks. They are also very common in indoor climbing walls.

On boulders with potentially serious falls, such as in highball bouldering, the mats can be supported by spotters (see image), who try to ensure that a falling climber lands on the mats. It is common for modern boulderers to use multiple bouldering mats at a time to give complete coverage of the fall area below a bouldering problem.

There is some concern amongst climbers about the excessive use of bouldering mats and in particular the employment of 'stacking' (i.e. layers of mats in a vertical pile), and whether 'stacked' mats are akin aid climbing that could help with a difficult 'first move' on a route, and whether the use of 'stacked' mats reduces the objective danger—and thus the technical grade and challenge—of a given traditional climbing or highball bouldering route. In 2023, Austrian climber Bernd Zangerl wrote in Climbing regarding the use of excess bouldering mats, "Today, we see landing zones resembling construction sites", and adding: "... I wonder if it wouldn't be more honest just to toprope?".

== Origin ==
The earliest bouldering mats are associated with the Hueco Tanks bouldering area, and its bouldering pioneer John Sherman. In a 2022 interview with Climbing, Sherman credited El Paso-based boulder climbers, Donny Hardin and Fred Nakovic, for the original idea "after a heel-bruising session not at Hueco, but City of Rocks, New Mexico". In 1992, Sherman and Bruce Pottenger, from Bishop-based climbing gear manufacturer Kinnaloa, designed the first commercially available bouldering mat/crashpad with the "nylon sleeve, carrying straps, dual-density replaceable foam" that would become the standard design in bouldering, which they sold as the "Kinnaloa Sketchpad" ('sketchpad' was a slang used in the area for prototype/customized mats).

By 2019, Climbing Magazine estimated that there were over 50 manufacturers of bouldering mats/crashpads worldwide.

== See also ==
- List of grade milestones in rock climbing#Boulder problems
- Rock-climbing equipment
