= Spotting (climbing) =

Technique in climbing and bouldering

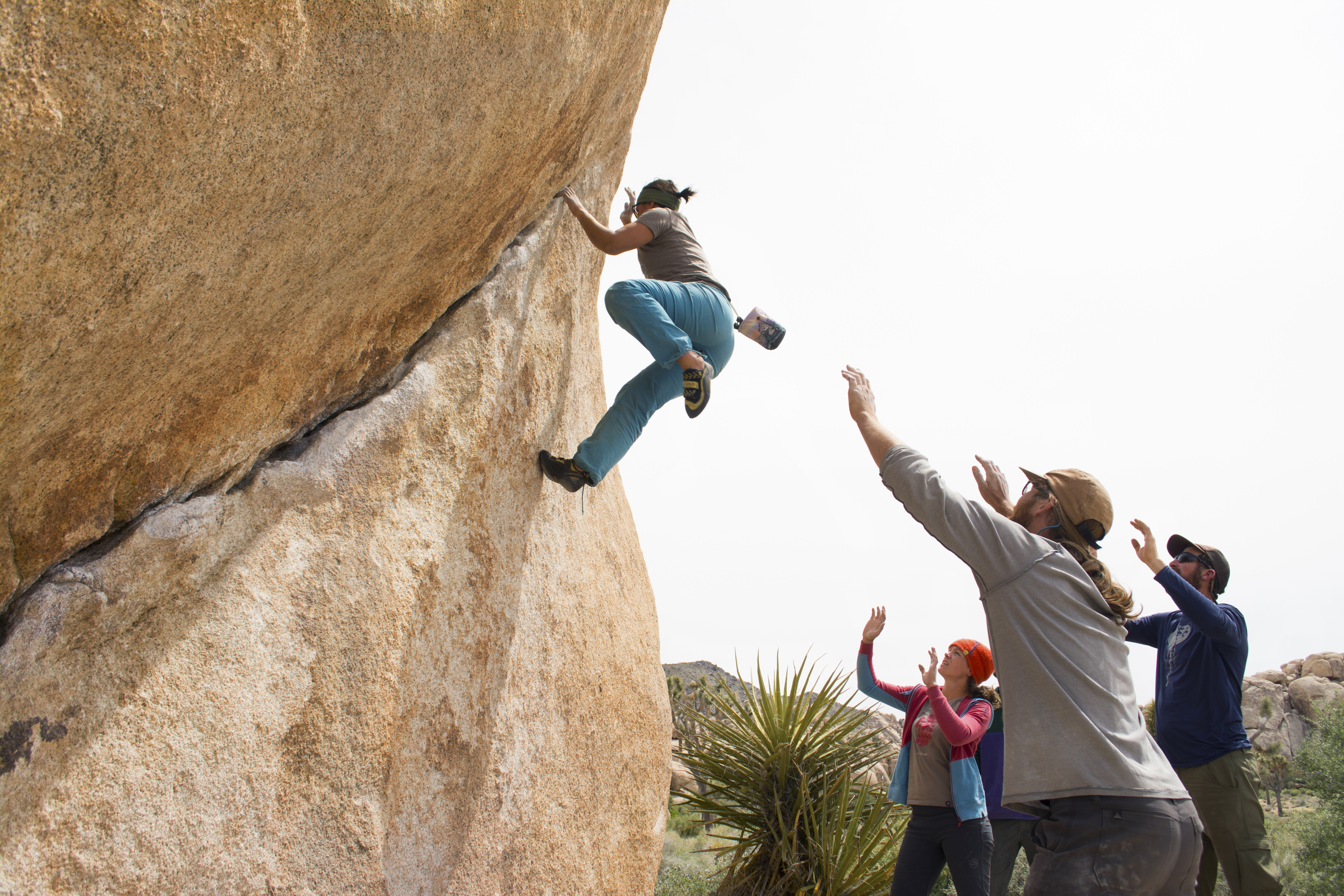
Spotters helping a climber on The Chube V2 (5+), in Joshua Tree

Spotting is a climbing technique that is used mostly in bouldering, where other climbers stand beneath an active climber on a route in order to break the impact of any fall, and to reduce the chance of an uncontrolled fall that could result in a serious head or back injury. Except with very light climbers, or very short likely falls, spotter(s) are not trying to catch the falling climber, but instead to deflect their trajectory; in general, the spotter(s) focus on the active climber's hips, which will correlate to their centre of gravity, and will thus mark the line of any possible fall.

Spotters will also move any bouldering mats along the ground to make sure that they are always beneath the climber's latest position and covering the most likely landing zone for any fall. Spotters will try to maintain a flexible body position (e.g. bent knees) with the fingers together and thumbs turned in — known as "spoons" — to safely absorb the impact of any fall and avoid injury to themselves. Spotters have been severely injured, and even hospitalized, as a result of spotting.

Various types of catches are used in advanced spotting including the falling giant (double-palming the climber's bottom), the pixie catch (grabbing the climber's waist), the tackle (pushing the climber away from an obstacle) and the cave catch (for spotting on overhangs). A power-spot is where the spotter takes some weight off the climber by pressing against their hips or back to enable the climber to practice the hardest crux moves.

The most serious form of spotting is for highball bouldering, where the climber might be falling from a height above 7 metres (23 feet), which can generate a force equal to the weight of a vehicle. The impact force of a climber falling from higher up on a highball boulder, therefore, makes normal spotting very dangerous. A highball-spotting technique known as "pad-fu" has been used where the spotter holds a thick bouldering mat that they use to deflect a falling climber onto a bigger stack of mats and to absorb some of the energy of the fall.

== See also ==
- Beta (climbing)
- Bouldering mat
