= Jack Sherman (disambiguation) =

Jack Sherman (1956–2020) was an American guitarist, formerly of the Red Hot Chili Peppers.

Jack Sherman may also refer to:

- Jack Sherman (footballer) (1900–1969), Australian Football player who played for Footscray in the VFL
- Jack Sherman (statistician)

== See also ==
- John Sherman (disambiguation)
