= Harry Luman Russell =

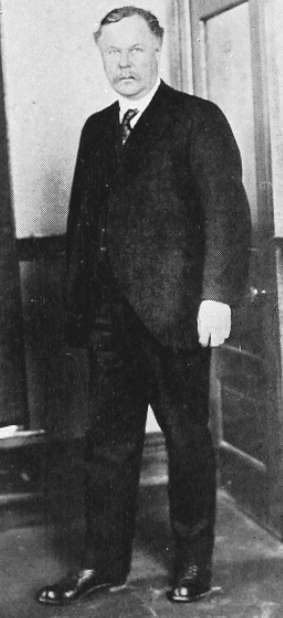
- Born: March 12, 1866; Poynette, Wisconsin, US
- Died: April 11, 1954 (aged 88); Madison, Wisconsin, US
- Resting place: Poynette, Wisconsin
- Education: Ph.D.
- Alma mater: University of Wisconsin; Johns Hopkins University
- Occupations: Bacteriologist, educator
- Notable credit(s): Pasteurization of milk, cold curing of cheese
- Political party: Republican (as of 1924)
- Spouse(s): Hannah May Delany, Suzanne Cocroft 1932 Washington D.C.

Harry Luman Russell (March 12, 1866 – April 11, 1954) was an American bacteriologist and educator. During 1907–1931, he was dean of the University of Wisconsin College of Agriculture. In 1908 he served as president of the American Society for Microbiology.

== Biography ==
Rusell was born in Poynette, Wisconsin, the son of country doctor E. Fred Russell and his wife Lucinda E. Waldron, he attended Poynette High School before matriculating to the University of Wisconsin in 1884. Following his graduation with a B.S in 1888, he undertook graduate studies in Biology and received his M.S. in 1890. He went to Europe for further study under Robert Koch and Louis Pasteur; first at the University of Berlin, then at the Zoological Station in Naples, and finally at the Pasteur Institute in Paris. Returning to the U.S., he attended Johns Hopkins University, where he was awarded a Ph.D. in 1892 with a dissertation titled Bacteria in Their Relation to Vegetable Tissue.

He became a fellow at the University of Chicago in 1892, then joined the faculty of the University of Wisconsin the following year as an assistant professor. On December 20, 1893, he married Hannah May Delany (1868–1914); the couple had four children; Gertude Estelle (1895–1922), Eldon Babcock (1900–1997), Donald (died at 9 months in 1897), and an unnamed son (died at 15 days in 1901). He became a full professor in 1896. In 1903, he was named director of the Wisconsin state hygienic laboratory and became dean of the University of Wisconsin College of Agriculture in 1907, succeeding William Arnon Henry. In 1931, he stepped down from his post as Dean when he was named director of the University of Wisconsin Alumni Research Foundation.

Russell was a charter member of the American Society for Microbiology and was named its president in 1908. He served as the president of the Wisconsin tuberculosis sanitaria advisory board, chaired the American Banker's Association agriculture advisory committee, and president of the American Association of Land Grant Colleges and Universities. Among his scientific investigations was a method for more thorough pasteurization of milk, the cold curing of cheese, and tuberculin testing of cows. He demonstrated that canned vegetables could be preserved without harm by cooking them within the can.

== Bibliography ==
- Outlines of dairy bacteriology (1894) with E. G. Hastings
- A bacterial rot of cabbage and allied plants (1898)
- Agricultural bacteriology (1898) with E. G. Hastings
- Public water supplies (1901) with F. E. Turncaure
- Experimental dairy bacteriology (1914) with E. G. Hastings
