= Chloé Webster =

Scottish actress (born 1989)

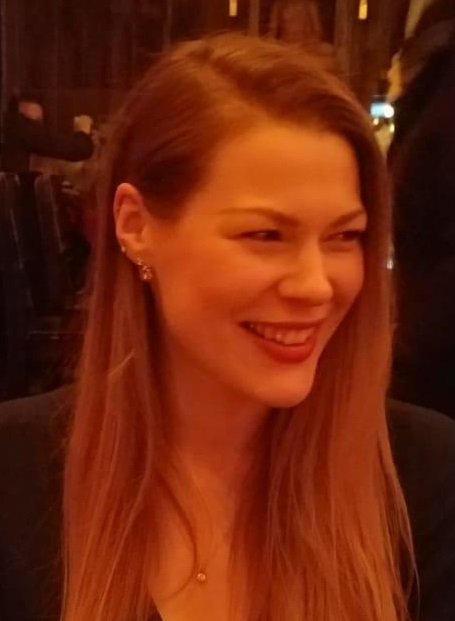
- Born: May 22, 1989 (age 36); Kinross, Scotland
- Education: Edinburgh's Telford College, American Musical and Dramatic Academy
- Occupation: actress
- Years active: 2013–present

Chloé Webster (born May 22, 1989 in Kinross, Scotland) is a Scottish actress best known for her role as Daphne in the British TV series Indian Summers.

== Early life ==
Webster was born and raised in Kinross, Scotland. She found her love for performing at a young age when she started dance classes at Jacqueline Crawford's School of Dance, and then attended Edinburgh's Telford College to study musical theatre.

== Professional career ==
Webster moved to New York City at the age of 19, where she continued her studies, earning a bachelor of fine arts degree in musical theatre at the American Musical and Dramatic Academy. She performed in plays and musicals, and worked as a supporting artist on Gossip Girl and Blue Bloods. After three years, she returned to Scotland to continue working in TV and theatre.

She then moved to bigger roles, including Channel 4's period drama Indian Summers, which ran from 2015 to 2016 and the movie 1965.

== Selected appearances ==
=== Film ===
Date of Release	Name	Role	Notes
May 23, 2014	The Love Punch	production executive	Process Media
July 30, 2015	1965	Sue	Infinite Frameworks Studios

=== Stage ===
Date	Name	Role	Production Company/Notes
2013	Wizard of Oz (pantomime)	Glinda the Good Witch	Motherwell Civic Theatre

=== Television ===
Seasons	Name	Episode	Role	Network or Production Company
2015-2016	Indian Summers	season 1, episodes 1 ,8, and 10; season 2, episodes 1, 3, 4, 5, 6, 8, 9 10	Daphne	Channel 4 (U.K.), P.B.S. Masterpiece (U.S.)
