= Attorney General Sherman =

Attorney General Sherman may refer to:

- Carl Sherman (1890–1956), Attorney General of New York
- Edgar J. Sherman (1834–1914), Attorney General of Massachusetts

== See also ==
- General Sherman (disambiguation)
