= Senator Sherman =

Senator Sherman may refer to:

== Members of the United States Senate ==
- John Sherman (1823–1900), U.S. Senator from Ohio from 1881 to 1897
- Lawrence Yates Sherman (1858–1939), U.S. Senator from Illinois from 1913 to 1921
- Roger Sherman (1721–1793), U.S. Senator from Connecticut from 1791 to 1793

== United States state senate members ==
- Alpheus Sherman (1780–1866), New York State Senate
- Benjamin Sherman (Wisconsin politician) (1836–1915), Wisconsin State Senate
- George C. Sherman (1799–1853), New York State Senate
- Josiah Sherman (fl. 1860s–1870s), Georgia State Senate
- Roger Sherman (Maine politician) (1990s–2010s), Maine State Senate
- Tom Sherman (politician) (born 1957), New Hampshire State Senate
