= William Sherman (disambiguation) =

William Sherman was a general in the Union Army during the American Civil War.

William Sherman may also refer to:

- William Sherman, victims of the Pottawatomie massacre
- William Henry Sherman (1865–1928), American publisher
- William Watts Sherman (1842–1912), New York City businessman
- William Sherman (journalist), American journalist, Pulitzer Prize winner in 1974
- Will Sherman (offensive lineman) (born 1999), American football offensive lineman
- Will Sherman (rugby union) (born 2003), American rugby union player
- William Tecumseh Sherman (Saint-Gaudens), a 1902 sculpture of the general
- PS 87 William Sherman, a New York City public school on the Upper West Side

== See also ==
- Will Sherman (disambiguation)
- William Sherman Jennings (1863–1920), American politician
- William Sherman Jennings House
- William Sherman Jewell, American politician and lawyer
