= James Morgan Sherman =

American professor (1890–1956)

James Morgan Sherman (March 6, 1890, Ash Grove, Fairfax County, Virginia – November 5, 1956) was an American professor of bacteriology and dairy industry. He was the president of the American Society for Microbiology in 1937.

== Education and career ==
Sherman attended primary school in Virginia and secondary school in Washington, D.C. He graduated from North Carolina State University with a B.S. in 1911 and from University of Wisconsin–Madison (UWM) with an M.S. in 1912 and with a Ph.D. in bacteriology in 1916. His thesis Studies on soil protozoa and their relation to the bacterial flora was supervised by Edwin George Hastings. Sherman worked as an assistant in bacteriology from 1913 to 1914 at UWM. In 1914, two years before receiving his Ph.D., he left Wisconsin for employment in Pennsylvania. At Pennsylvania State University, he was an instructor from 1914 to 1915 and an assistant professor from 1915 to 1917. From 1917 to 1923 he was a bacteriologist employed by the United States Department of Agriculture. At Cornell University he was a professor and head of the department of dairy industry from 1923 to 1955. At Cornell he held a joint appointment in the department of bacteriology. He was the author or coauthor of more than 100 scientific publications. He did research on streptococci, dairy and food bacteriology, and fermentation.

He was one of the U.S. delegates to the 9th International Dairy Congress held in 1931 in Denmark and delivered a talk on dairy research in Denmark and a talk on dairy research in Kiel. He was the editor-in-chief of the Journal of Bacteriology from 1944 to 1951. From 1947 to 1955 he was a member of the editorial committee of the Annual Review of Microbiology.

Sherman was elected in 1925 a Fellow of the American Association for the Advancement of Science. He was the president of the American Dairy Science Association in 1930. In 1948, he received an honorary doctorate in agriculture from the University of North Carolina. An important cheesemaking, bacterial subspecies, Propionibacterium freudenreichii subsp. shermanii, is named in his honor.

He was a member of the Cosmos Club.

== Family ==
One of his brothers was Henry Clapp Sherman. The Sherman family of Virginia's Ash Grove plantation descended from Philip Sherman, who arrived in the Massachusetts Bay Colony in 1633. In 1916, John Morgan Sherman married Gertrude Hendricks, who died in 1918. In 1928 he married Katherine Keiper. He was the father of three children.

== Selected publications ==
- Sherman, James M. (1921). "The Cause of Eyes and Characteristic Flavor in Emmental or Swiss Cheese". Journal of Bacteriology. 6 (4): 379–393. doi:10.1128/jb.6.4.379-393.1921. PMC 378936. PMID 16558926.
- ——; Albus, William R. (1923). "Physiological Youth in Bacteria". Journal of Bacteriology. 8 (2): 127–139. doi:10.1128/jb.8.2.127-139.1923. PMC 379007. PMID 16558990.
- ——; Albus, William R. (1924). "The Function of Lag in Bacterial Cultures". Journal of Bacteriology. 9 (3): 303–305. doi:10.1128/jb.9.3.303-305.1924. PMC 374834. PMID 16559049.
- ——; Stark, Pauline (1931). "Streptococci which Grow at High Temperatures". Journal of Bacteriology. 22 (4): 275–285. doi:10.1128/jb.22.4.275-285.1931. PMC 533273. PMID 16559519.
- ——; Cameron, George M. (1934). "Lethal Environmental Factors within the Natural Range of Growth". Journal of Bacteriology. 27 (4): 341–348. doi:10.1128/jb.27.4.341-348.1934. PMC 533628. PMID 16559704.
- Stark, Pauline; —— (1935). "Concerning the Habitat of Streptococcus lactis". Journal of Bacteriology. 30 (6): 639–646. doi:10.1128/jb.30.6.639-646.1935. PMC 533714. PMID 16559869.
- —— (1937). "The Streptococci". Bacteriological Reviews. 1 (1): 3–97. doi:10.1128/br.1.1.3-97.1937. PMC 440821. PMID 16350049.
- —— (1938). "The Enterococci and Related Streptococci". Journal of Bacteriology. 35 (2): 81–93. doi:10.1128/jb.35.2.81-93.1938. PMC 374429. PMID 16560094.
- Niven Jr., Charles F.; Smiley, Karl L.; —— (1941). "The Production of Large Amounts of a Polysaccharid by Streptococcus salivarius". Journal of Bacteriology. 41 (4): 479–484. doi:10.1128/jb.41.4.479-484.1941. PMC 374713. PMID 16560417. S2CID 42793584.
- Niven Jr., C. F.; Smiley, K. L.; —— (1942). "The Hydrolysis of Arginine by Streptococci". Journal of Bacteriology. 43 (6): 651–660. doi:10.1128/jb.43.6.651-660.1942. PMC 373632. PMID 16560527.
- ——; Niven Jr., C. F.; Smiley, K. L. (1943). "Streptococcus salivarius and Other Non-hemolytic Streptococci of the Human Throat". Journal of Bacteriology. 45 (3): 249–263. doi:10.1128/jb.45.3.249-263.1943. PMC 373738. PMID 16560630.
- Niven Jr., C. F.; —— (1944). "Nutrition of the Enterococci". Journal of Bacteriology. 47 (4): 335–342. doi:10.1128/jb.47.4.335-342.1944. PMC 373922. PMID 16560783.
- Loewe, Leo; Plummer N.; Niven Jr., C. F.; —— (1946). "Streptococcus in subacute bacterial endocarditis". Journal of the American Medical Association. 130 (5): 257. doi:10.1001/jama.1946.02870050009002. PMID 21010018.
