= Judge Sherman =

Judge Sherman may refer to:

- Charles Taylor Sherman (1811–1879), district judge of the United States District Court for the Northern District of Ohio
- Daniel Sherman (judge) (1721–1799), American judge in Connecticut
- Gary Sherman (politician) (born 1949), judge of the Wisconsin Court of Appeals
- George C. Sherman (1799–1853), associate judge of the Jefferson County (New York) Court
- Lawrence Y. Sherman (1858–1939), judge for McDonough County, Illinois
- Lewis F. Sherman (1917–1974), municipal and Superior Court judge
- Taylor Sherman (1758–1815), probate judge for the District of Norwalk, Connecticut, son of Daniel Sherman, father of Charles Robert Sherman

== See also ==
- Justice Sherman (disambiguation)
