= Gene Sherman =

Gene Sherman may refer to:

- Gene Sherman (art specialist), (born 1947) South African-born Australian academic
- Gene Sherman (reporter) (1915–1969), journalist for the Los Angeles Times
- Gene Sherman (sportscaster), pioneer radio and television sportscaster in Iowa
