= Henry Sherman =

American judge and author

Henry Sherman (March 6, 1808 – March 28, 1879) was an American lawyer, judge, and author. He served as Chief Justice of the New Mexico Territory. He was a first cousin of Henry Mitchell (New York politician), nephew of Judge Roger Minott Sherman and the great-nephew of founding father Roger Sherman.

== Early life and education ==
Sherman was the third son of Josiah and Hannah (Jones) Sherman, of Albany, N. Y., where he was born March 6, 1808. He graduated from Yale College in 1829. He spent a part of the first year after graduation in the Princeton Theological Seminary, and then took up the study of law in the Yale Law School, returning in 1832 to his home in Albany, and there entering his profession.

== Legal career ==
Soon after entering the practice of law, Sherman moved to New York City, and while practicing there published in 1841 a Digest of the Law of Marine Insurance, which ran through several editions. In 1843 he also published a Governmental History of the U. S., for use in schools. In 1850 he removed to Hartford, Connecticut, and there published (1858) a work on slavery, and (1860) an enlarged edition of his History. In 1861 he moved to Washington, and was employed until 1868 in connection with one of the bureaus of the Treasury Department. In 1868, he resumed the practice of his profession in Washington, in which he continued until his death, being at that time of the law firm of Sherman & AtLee.

Sherman was a personal friend of President Abraham Lincoln, who on the morning before his assassination in 1865 tendered him the Chief Justiceship of the Territory of New Mexico; his commission was afterwards sent him by President Andrew Johnson, having been issued on May 10, 1865. Sherman succeeded Kirby Benedict, who had run up against harsh criticism in his execution of the office, and had been recalled from office by President Lincoln, but Sherman himself resigned the office very soon.

Returning to the Treasury Department, Sherman wrote an article in the Intelligencer asserting that an extra session of Congress had been unconstitutional; the article was mistakenly attributed by some to U.S. Attorney General Henry Stanbery.

== Personal life and death ==
He was married, Sept. 20, 1843, to Anna Amelia, daughter of Michael Burnham, Esq, publisher of the New York Evening Post. She survived him with three of their five children.

Sherman died in Washington, D.C., March 28, 1879, after a three weeks' illness, from erysipelas.
