= Tom Sherman (cricketer) =

English cricketer

Tom Sherman in 1903

Thomas Sherman (1 December 1825 – 10 October 1911) was an English professional cricketer, active 1846–70, who played mainly for Surrey. Born in Mitcham, he was the son of James Sherman and nephew of John Sherman; he died in Croydon. A right-handed batsman and a right-arm fast roundarm bowler, Sherman made 82 known appearances.
