= USS Forrest Sherman =

Two ships in the United States Navy have been named USS Forrest Sherman for Admiral Forrest Sherman.

- USS Forrest Sherman (DD-931) was the lead ship of her class and served from 1955 to 1982.
- USS Forrest Sherman (DDG-98) is an Arleigh Burke-class destroyer commissioned 28 January 2006.
