= Sharman =

Sharman is an English surname. Notable people with the surname include:

- Alison Sharman, British children's TV executive
- Bill Sharman (1926–2013), U.S. basketball player and coach
- Brenda Leithleiter Sharman, American beauty queen
- Brett Sharman (born 1987), South African Rugby Union player
- Charles Henry Ludovic Sharman (1881–1970), Canadian civil servant
- Charlotte Sharman (1832–1929), English humanitarian
- Colin Sharman, Baron Sharman (born 1943), British chairman of the Aviva Group
- Elizabeth Sharman (born 1957), British slalom and sprint canoer
- Daniel Sharman (born 1986), British actor
- Dew Sharman (born 1965), Suriname politician
- Helen Sharman (born 1963), British astronaut
- H. B. Sharman (1865–1953), Canadian Biblical scholar
- James Sharman, English television producer and sportscaster
- Jim Sharman (born 1945), Australian film and stage director and writer
- Jimmy Sharman (1887–1965), Australian boxing promoter
- John Edward Sharman (1892–1917), Canadian World War I flying ace
- John Fowler (British Army officer), whose middle name is Sharman
- Lucy Tyler-Sharman (born 1965), Australian cyclist
- Mark Sharman (born 1950), British broadcasting administrator
- Ralph Sharman (1895–1918), American Major League baseball player
- Robin Sharman (born 1979), English cyclist
- Samuel Sharman (1879–1951), American sports shooter
- William Sharman (born 1984), British international sprint hurdler

Sharman is also (less often) a given name, and may refer to

- Geoffrey Sharman Dawes (1918–1996), English psychologist
- George Lennox Sharman Shackle (1903–1992), English economist
- Sharman Apt Russell (born 1954), American science writer
- Sharman Douglas (1928–1996), American socialite
- Sharman Joshi (born 1979), Bollywood film actor
- Sharman Kadish (born 1959), English historian
- Sharman Macdonald (born 1951), Scottish playwright and mother of Keira Knightley
- Sharman Stone (1951–2026), Australian politician
- William Sharman Crawford (1781–1861), Irish politician

== See also ==
- Sharman Networks, company owning the rights to the KaZaA file sharing software
- Sharman (TV series), a British TV series about a private detective (1996)
- List of Old English (Anglo-Saxon) surnames
