= Scherman =

The surname Scherman may refer to:

- David Scherman
- Jan Scherman
- Fred Scherman, American baseball player
- Harry Scherman, American publisher and economist
- Karl Gustaf Scherman, Swedish economist and government official
- Katharine Scherman
- Leo Scherman
- Lucian Scherman
- Nosson Scherman, American Haredi rabbi
- Rowland Scherman
- Tony Scherman

== See also ==
- Sherman (name)
