= John Sherman (climber) =

American rock climber

John Sherman (born 1959), nicknamed Verm (short for "Vermin") is an American rock climber and a pioneer in the promotion and development of the climbing discipline of bouldering. He is also a climbing writer and outdoor photographer, and the originator of the V-grade system (after his nickname), for grading the technical difficulty of boulder problems, which has since become one of the dominant grading systems worldwide.

== Climbing career ==
Sherman started climbing at age 15 at Indian Rocks. He came to prominence as one of the developers of the important Hueco Tanks bouldering area in Texas, where he made over 400 first free ascents in the 1980s and early 1990s. As well as being an early adopter of bouldering as a sport, through his books and writings, Sherman played an important role in the promotion and development of the sport around the world. Sherman was the author of the notable 1991 bouldering guidebook, Hueco Tanks Climbing and Bouldering Guide, which launched the important V-grade rating system. In 1992, Sherman and Bruce Pottenger designed the first commercially available bouldering pad with the "nylon sleeve, carrying straps, dual-density replaceable foam" that would become the standard design in bouldering, which they sold as the "Kinnaloa Sketchpad".

Sherman was a highly visible 'enigmatic' and 'colorful' character in the climbing world throughout the 1980s and 1990s. In 2000, when reviewing Sherman's book, Sherman Exposed: Slightly Censored Climbing Stories, for the American Alpine Journal, climbing writer David Stevenson said: "If you’re of the opinion that Sherman is a raving lunatic, he’d probably be the last to argue with you. In fact, you’d do well to remember that he’s the one who very self-consciously gave you that impression in the first place. Don’t let the hyperbolic style fool you—this is one very smart guy", and also: "In Sherman we see the embodiment of both Royal Robbins and Warren Harding, a pair whose individual values are generally understood to be mutually exclusive. But Sherman somehow takes Harding’s semper farcimas and combines it with Robins pure, ground-up ethic. I suppose one of the tricks to reading Sherman is to know when he’s joking and when he’s serious: the answer is usually both a and b."

In 1988, Sherman appeared in the spring catalog for mountaineering retailer Patagonia in a photograph where he is shown drinking a bottle of Coopers Best Extra stout beer while free solo climbing–in his sandals–the sport climbing route Lord of the Rings 8b (5.13d), in the Mount Arapiles, Australia; the image became popular amongst climbers, and Patagonia reproduced it in subsequent catalogs and also made it into a standalone poster.

== Personal life ==
Sherman grew up in Berkeley, California and earned a degree in geology at University of Colorado Boulder. For many years, he pursued a mostly seasonal career working as a 'wellsite geologist' for oil exploration companies, which he attributed to giving him the financial freedom to indulge his passion for continuous travel.

== Published works ==
- Sherman, John (January 1991). Hueco Tanks a Climbers and Boulderers Guide (1st ed.). Falcon Publishing. ISBN 978-0934641326.
- Sherman, John (1994). Stone Crusade: A Historical Guide to Bouldering in America. American Alpine Club. ISBN 978-0930410575.
- Sherman, John (1999). Sherman Exposed: Slightly Censored Climbing Stories. USA: Mountaineers Books. ISBN 978-0-89886-852-4.
- Sherman, John (December 2017). Better Bouldering (3rd ed.). Falcon Guides. ISBN 978-1493029273.

== See also ==
- John Gill, a pioneer in modern bouldering
- Fred Nicole, a pioneer in modern bouldering

== External ==
- Official website
- Watch John “Verm” Sherman’s Bouldering Come Back Gripped Magazine (2017)
