= USS General Sherman =

Gunboat of the United States Navy

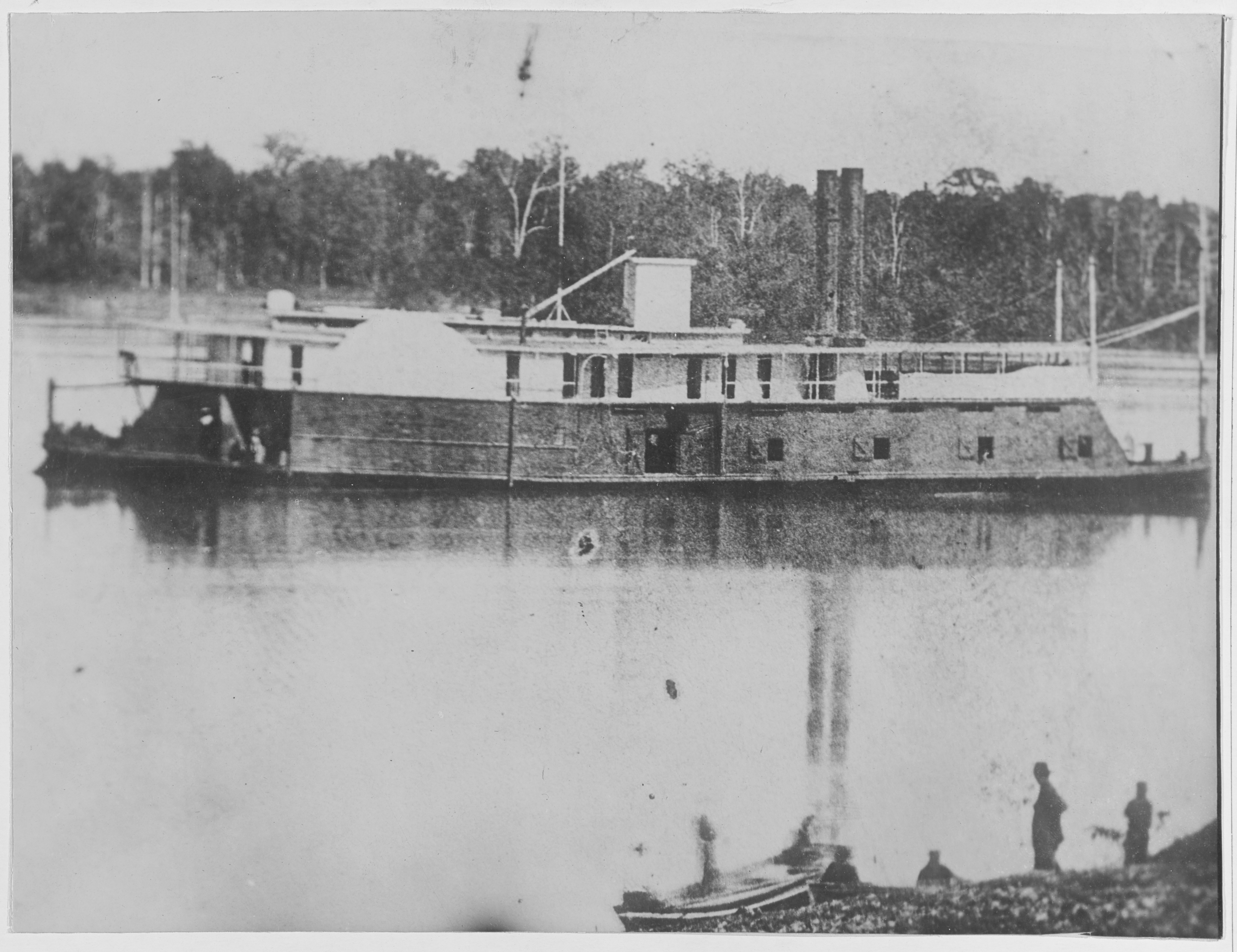
- The only known existing photograph of USS General Sherman

History

United States
- Namesake: William Tecumseh Sherman
- Launched: 1864
- Commissioned: 27 July 1864
- Fate: Returned to the Army; 3 June 1865

General characteristics
- Displacement: 187 tons
- Length: 168 ft (51 m)
- Beam: 26 ft (7.9 m)
- Depth of hold: 4 ft 6 in (1.37 m)
- Propulsion: steam engine; side wheel-propelled
- Armament: two 20-pounder Parrott rifles; three 24-pounder howitzers

USS General Sherman was acquired from the U.S. War Department by the Union Navy during the American Civil War as a gunboat in waterways of the Confederate South. She was named after Gen. William T. Sherman.

== Service history ==
General Sherman, a 187-ton side-wheel "tinclad" river gunboat, was one of four light wooden gunboats built at Chattanooga, Tennessee, for the War Department in 1864. She commissioned at Bridgeport, Alabama, 27 July 1864, Acting Master Joseph W. Morehead in command. Turned over to the Navy and commissioned in July 1864, General Sherman spent most of her service on the Upper Tennessee River. General Sherman was assigned to the 11th District, Mississippi Squadron, and became part of Lt. Moreau Forrest's gunboat fleet on the upper Tennessee River.

Leaving Bridgeport, Alabama, 22 August, she patrolled with other gunboats between Decatur, Alabama, and Muscle Shoals, Alabama, controlling guerrilla attacks and working to prevent major elements of Confederate General John Bell Hood's army from crossing the river into Tennessee. General Sherman continued to patrol until she returned to Bridgeport for repairs 17 December. Returning to the upper Tennessee River, General Sherman lent vital artillery support to the forces of Gen. James B. Steedman at Decatur, 27 December, shelling Confederate emplacements as Union Army troops crossed the river. She again patrolled the river, attempting to cut off the withdrawal of Hood's army from Tennessee and convoying Union supply ships, until the war ended. General Sherman was returned to the Army Quartermaster Department at Chattanooga, Tennessee, 3 June 1865

== Bibliography ==
- Silverstone, Paul H. (2006). Civil War Navies 1855–1883. The U.S. Navy Warship Series. New York: Routledge. ISBN 978-0-415-97870-5.
- DANFS
