= Chloe Sherman =

American photographer (born 1969)

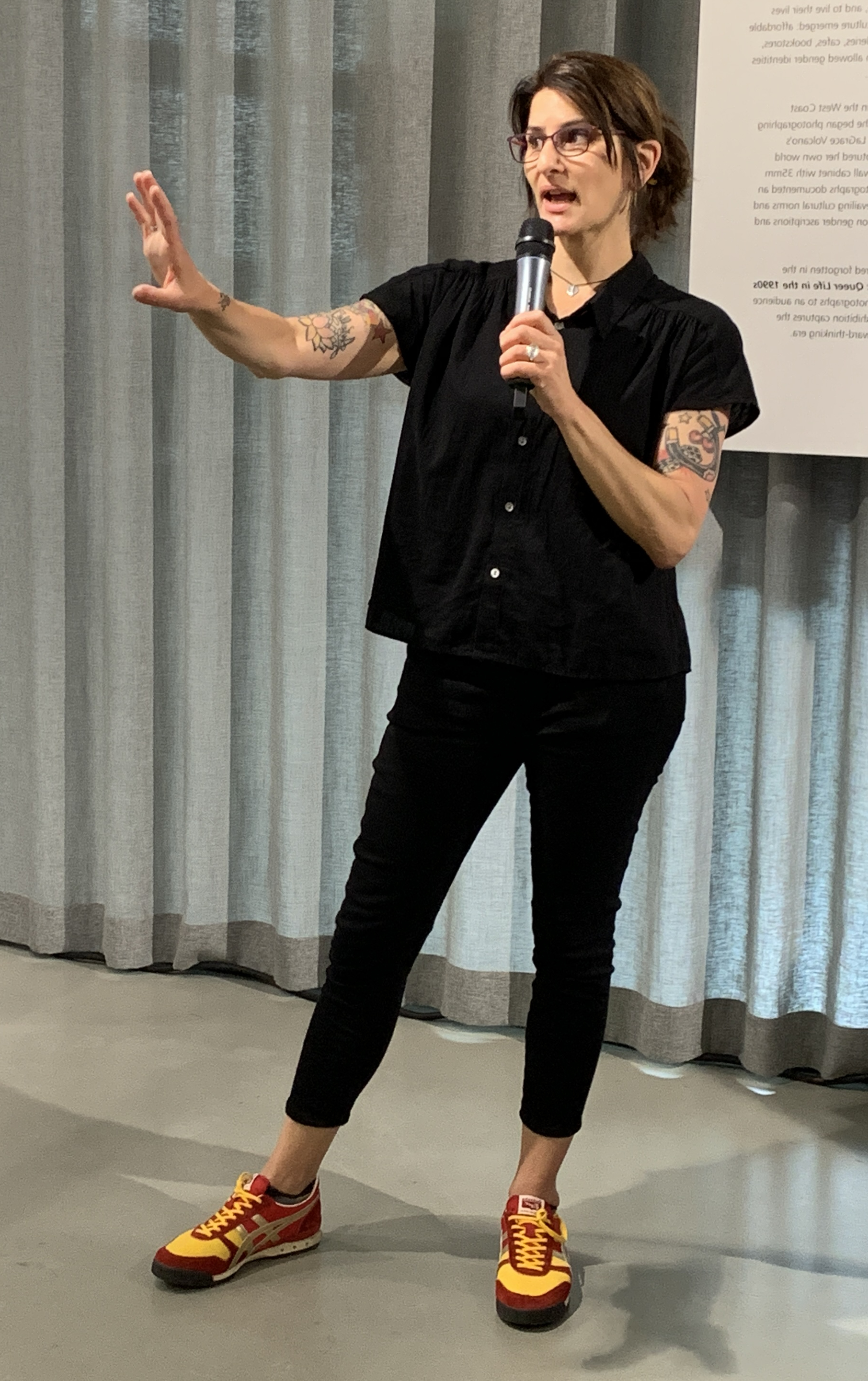
- Sherman in 2023
- Born: 1969 (age 56–57); New York City, US
- Education: San Francisco Art Institute (BFA)
- Occupation: Photographer
- Website: chloeshermanstudio.com

Chloe Sherman (born 1969) is an American photographer. She is best known for her 1990s film photographs of the lesbian and queer community in the Mission District of San Francisco, and her related traveling solo exhibition Renegades: San Francisco, The 1990s.

== Life and work ==
Chloe Sherman was born in 1969, in New York City, and raised by hippie parents who would move the family to Portland, Oregon, where she would grow up.

Her move to San Francisco, California was inspired by a zine she read in her hometown bookstore titled Love Bites (1991) by Del LaGrace Volcano. Upon visiting for the first time Sherman would come across a newly opened cafe, the Bearded Lady Cafe in the Mission District. This became the social hub for Sherman and other artists alike, such as Catherine Opie, who would be an important factor in Sherman's attendance to the San Francisco Art Institute. Sherman would later graduate with a BFA degree in photography from the San Francisco Art Institute.

Sherman's work was heavily inspired by the work of Del LaGrace Volcano's photographs capturing the lesbian/dyke culture of London. Her photographs act as an archive of her life. Shot on 35mm film Sherman took to snapping photos that highlighted her world, the intimacy, community, and resistance from the mainstream. These shots included an emphasis on the butch and femme subculture of the 1990s.

However, may of these photos were not made public for roughly thirty years. In 2021, Sherman's daughter saw a photo her mother had taken uncredited on Instagram. This led to her daughter pushing Sherman to create an account and share the work she had done, leading to her eventual exhibitions and publications.

== Exhibitions ==
=== Solo exhibitions ===
- 2022: RENEGADES San Francisco: the 1990s, Schlomer Haus Gallery, San Francisco, California
- 2023: RENEGADES San Francisco: Queer Life in the 1990s, F³ Freiraum für Fotografie, Berlin, Germany
- 2024: RENEGADES San Francisco: the 1990s, Leica Camera Gallery, San Francisco, California
- 2025: RENEGADES San Francisco: the 1990s, Von Lintel Gallery, Los Angeles, California
- 2025: RENEGADES. San Francisco: Queer Life in the 1990s, Photobastei, Zürich, Switzerland

=== Group exhibitions ===
- 2026: Photos on Fridges, Harkawik Gallery, New York City, New York
- 2025: Around Group f/64: Legacies and Counterhistories in Bay Area Photography, SF MOMA, San Francisco, California
- 2024: What We Love: Street Photography, San Francisco, California and Warsaw, Poland
- 2024: Who's Afraid Of Stardust, Kunsthalle Nürnberg, Nürnberg, Germany

== Collections ==
- Addison Gallery of American Art at Phillips Academy, Andover, Massachusetts
- National Portrait Gallery, Washington, D.C.
- San Francisco Museum of Modern Art (SFMoMA), San Francisco, California

== Publications ==
- Bright, Susie; Posener, Jill, eds. (1997). Nothing but the Girl: The Blatant Lesbian Image: A Portfolio and Exploration of Lesbian Erotic Photography. Freedom Editions. ISBN 978-1860470011.
- Sherman, Chloe (July 2023). Barth, Nadine; Mouratidi, Katharina (eds.). Renegades: San Francisco: The 1990s. Lynn Breedlove (text), Catherine Opie (text), Anna Joy Springer (text). Hatje Cantz. ISBN 978-6-00003153-4.
- Cotton, Charlotte, ed. (November 2025). femxphotographers.org: Love. Hatje Cantz. ISBN 978-3-7757-6137-6.
- Ramos, Alex, ed. (2026). Meet Me In The City - Trick Dog. Trick Dog. ISBN 979-8-218-82764-9.
