= Shearman =

Shearman is an English surname, which may be pronounced as "Sherman" (as for example with John Shearman). Notable people with the surname include:

- Ben Shearman (1884–1958), English footballer
- Billy Shearman, English footballer
- Bob Shearman (1939–1999), Australian rules footballer
- Donald Shearman (1926–2019), Australian Anglican bishop
- Douglas James Shearman (1918–2003), British geologist
- Edward James Shearman (1798–1878), British surgeon and writer
- Ernest Charles Shearman (1859–1939), British architect
- James Shearman, English conductor, orchestrator and composer
- John Shearman (1931–2003), English art historian
- John Francis Shearman (1831–1885), Irish priest, antiquarian and historian
- Linda Shearman, British ice dancer
- Montague Shearman (1857–1930), English judge and athlete
- Robert Shearman, English writer
- Robert Clarke Shearman (1825–1910), New Zealand policeman and farmer
- Russell Shearman (died in 1956), American special effects artist
- Simon Shearman (born 1964), English cricketer
- William Shearman (1767–1861), British physician and medical writer

== See also ==
- A Tribute to Buzz Shearman, album by the Canadian rock group Moxy
- Shearman & Sterling, New York law firm
- shearman, a cloth-finisher
- Sherman-roots.com
