= Journal of Bacteriology =

- Discipline: Microbiology
- Language: English
- Edited by: George A. O'Toole Jr.

Publication details
- History: 1916–present
- Publisher: American Society for Microbiology (United States)
- Frequency: Monthly
- Open access: Delayed, after 6 months; Hybrid
- Impact factor: 2.7 (2023)

Standard abbreviations
- ISO 4: J. Bacteriol.

Indexing
- CODEN: JOBAAY
- ISSN: 0021-9193 (print); 1098-5530 (web)
- LCCN: sg16000091
- OCLC no.: 474775920

Links
- Journal homepage; Online access; Online archive

The Journal of Bacteriology is a monthly peer-reviewed scientific journal established in 1916. It is published by the American Society for Microbiology and the editor in chief is George A. O'Toole Jr. (Dartmouth College). The journal is delayed open access: content is available for free at the journal's website and at PubMed Central after a six-month embargo. The journal is also hybrid open access allowing authors to pay an article processing fee for their articles to be available for free immediately.

== Abstracting and indexing ==
The journal is abstracted and indexed in:

- Biological Abstracts
- BIOSIS Previews
- CAB Abstracts
- Cambridge Scientific Abstracts
- Chemical Abstracts Service
- Current Contents/Life Sciences
- Elsevier Biobase
- Embase
- Food Science and Technology Abstracts
- Global Health
- Index Medicus/MEDLINE/PubMed
- International Bibliography of Periodical Literature
- Referativnyi Zhurnal
- Science Citation Index Expanded
- Scopus
- Tropical Diseases Bulletin

According to the Journal Citation Reports, the journal has a 2023 impact factor of 2.7.
