= Will Sherman (rugby union) =

- Born: May 22, 2003 (age 23) Salt Lake City, Utah, United States
- Height: 196 cm (6 ft 5 in)
- Weight: 115 kg (254 lb; 18 st 2 lb)
- School: East High School
- University: UCLA

Rugby union career
- Position(s): Lock, Flanker
- Current team: Red Hurricanes Osaka
Youth career
- –2022: East High School
- 2022–2025: UCLA Bruins
Amateur team(s)
Years	Team	Apps	(Points)
2025	Randwick		
Senior career
Years	Team	Apps	(Points)
2026	Anthem	10	(5)
2026–	Red Hurricanes Osaka	0	(0)
- Correct as of 29 August 2026
International career
Years	Team	Apps	(Points)
2023	United States U20	4	(0)
2025	United States U23	2	(0)

William Sherman (born May 22, 2003) is an American professional rugby union player who currently plays as a lock for Japan Rugby League One club Red Hurricanes Osaka.

== Early life ==
Sherman was born in Salt Lake City, Utah in 2003. His father, Wade Sherman, had reportedly been a fan of rugby union after encountering people play the sport at Sydney's Bondi Beach in his youth. He later played the sport at school in California and Utah.

Growing up, Sherman was more interested in ice hockey, however later transitioned to playing rugby union at school. He was coached by his father, and was reportedly a talented player. After high school, Sherman enrolled at the prestigious University of California, Los Angeles (UCLA), and became a standout player in the schools rugby program.

== Career ==
At the end of the 2025 MLR season, Sherman was selected by Anthem Rugby Carolina as the first pick in the 2025 Major League Rugby Collegiate Draft. At the time of the draft, he was playing club rugby for Randwick in the Shute Shield. He later made several appearances for the United States U23s on their tour of South Africa under Anthem coach Agustín Cavalieri, before later joining the team ahead of their 2026 campaign.

Sherman was a regular in the Anthem lineup during his rookie season, featuring in all ten of the club's regular-season matches in 2026. He started in six matches, including the historic season opener, when Anthem secured the first victory in franchise's history with a win over the California Legion. Sherman recording an impressive 19 tackles. He also notably contributed to Anthem's only other victory of the regular season, coming off the bench against the Seattle Seawolves in third round and scoring his maiden MLR try.

In July 2026, World Rugby had made the decision to cease its funding of Anthem RC, forcing the club to fold. By August, Sherman joined the Red Hurricanes Osaka in the Japan Rugby League One, Division 2.

== Career statistics ==
=== Club ===
As of 29 August 2026.

Statistics by club, season and competition
Club	Season	League			
Club	Season	Division	Apps	Tries	Points
Anthem	2026	Major League Rugby	10	1	5
Red Hurricanes Osaka	2026–27	Japan Rugby League One, Division 2	TBD		
Red Hurricanes Osaka	Total		10	1	5
