= James Sherman (cricketer) =

English cricketer

James Sherman (25 March 1791 – 21 June 1831) was an English professional cricketer. He was the younger brother of John Sherman and the father of Tom Sherman.

== Career ==
Sherman, an occasional wicketkeeper, was mainly associated with Surrey and he made 12 known appearances from 1810 to 1821. He played in the England v Surrey match at Lord's (Old), July 16–18 1810. His last appearance was at the Gentlemen v Players at Lord's, July 23–24, 1821.

== External sources ==
- CricketArchive record
