= John Sherman (cricketer) =

English cricketer (1788–1861)

John Sherman (17 October 1788 – 31 August 1861) was an English professional cricketer. His career spanned a record-equalling 44 seasons from 1809 to 1852 – he shares this record with W G Grace. He was the elder brother of James Sherman and the uncle of Tom Sherman.

He made 27 known appearances from 1809 to 1852.

Sherman was a right-handed batsman and a right arm slow underarm bowler. He played his first four matches at the original Lord's Cricket Ground and the next four at its present location. His career fell into a long hiatus from 1823 but after a gap of 21 years he reappeared for Manchester and took 11 for 50 against Yorkshire. He played another five matches before his last appearance in 1852.
