= Wild Country =

Wild Country may refer to:

== Film ==
- Wild Country (1947 film), an American film directed by Ray Taylor
- The Wild Country, a 1970 Disney film directed by Robert Totten
- Wild Country (2005 film), a low budget British horror film

== Literature ==
=== Fiction ===
- The Wild Country, a 1948 novel by Louis Bromfield
- Wild Country, a 1985 novel by Dean Ing, the third installment in the Quantrill series
- Wild Country, a 1992 novel by David L. Robbins under the pseudonym John Killdeer, the first installment in the Mountain Majesty series
- Wild Country, a 2019 novel by Anne Bishop

=== Non-fiction ===
- Wild Country: The Best of Andy Russell, a 2004 book by Andy Russell
- Wild Country: The Man Who Made Friends, a 2016 book by Mark Vallance

== Television ==
- "Wild Country", Eagle Riders episode 35 (1997)
- Wild Wild Country, a 2018 Netflix documentary series about the Rajneesh movement

== Other uses ==
- Wild Country (company), a manufacturer of climbing equipment

== See also ==
- Wild in the Country (disambiguation)
