= Hex (climbing) =

Rock climbing equipment to arrest a fall

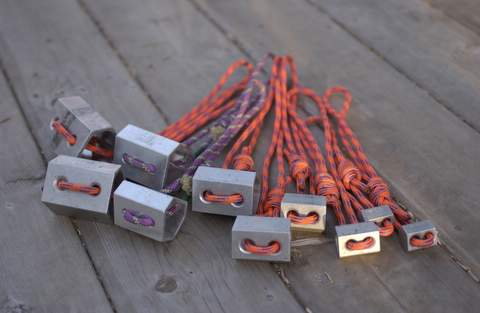
Hexentrics (Black Diamond's brand of hexes)

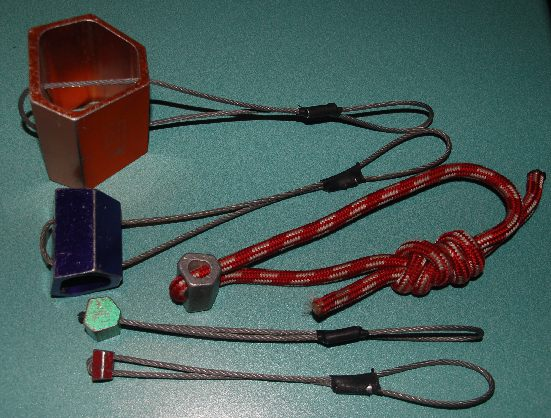
Different kinds of hexes

A hex is an item of rock-climbing equipment used to protect climbers from falls. They are intended to be wedged into a crack or other opening in the rock, and do not require a hammer to place. They were developed as an alternative to pitons, which are hammered into cracks, damaging the rock. Most commonly, a carabiner will be used to join the hex to the climbing rope by means of a loop of webbing, cord or a cable which is part of the hex.

Hexes are a type of nut, a hollow eccentric hexagonal prism with tapered ends, usually threaded with webbing, a swaged cable, or a cord. They are manufactured by several firms, with a range of sizes varying from about 10–100 millimetres (0.4–4 in) wide. Climbers select a range of sizes to use on a specific climb based on the characteristics of the cracks in the rock encountered on that particular climb. Sides may be straight or curved although the functioning principles remain the same no matter which shape is selected; the lack of sharp corners on curved models may make them easier to remove from the rock.

Hexes may be placed either as passive or active protection. When placed passively they work like chock stones in flared cracks, like other climbing nuts, just larger and with a different shape. Active protection is achieved by orienting the webbing so that a pull causes a camming action against the rock similar to Tricams, allowing for placement in parallel cracks. They are often preferred by alpine mountaineers over spring-loaded camming devices because of their lack of moving parts and overall lower weight for the same size crack.

The original hexes were invented by Yvon Chouinard and Tom Frost, and called Hexentrics. The "polycentric" hexentric was designed by Swedish–Norwegian climber Tomas Carlstrom and given to Chouinard Equipment in 1973. They applied for a U.S. patent in 1974 and it was granted on April 6, 1976. Hexes were produced by Chouinard Equipment, Ltd until 1989, when they was sold as a design to Black Diamond Equipment. They are produced and sold in much the same design today.
