= CAMP (company) =

Italian manufacturer of climbing equipment

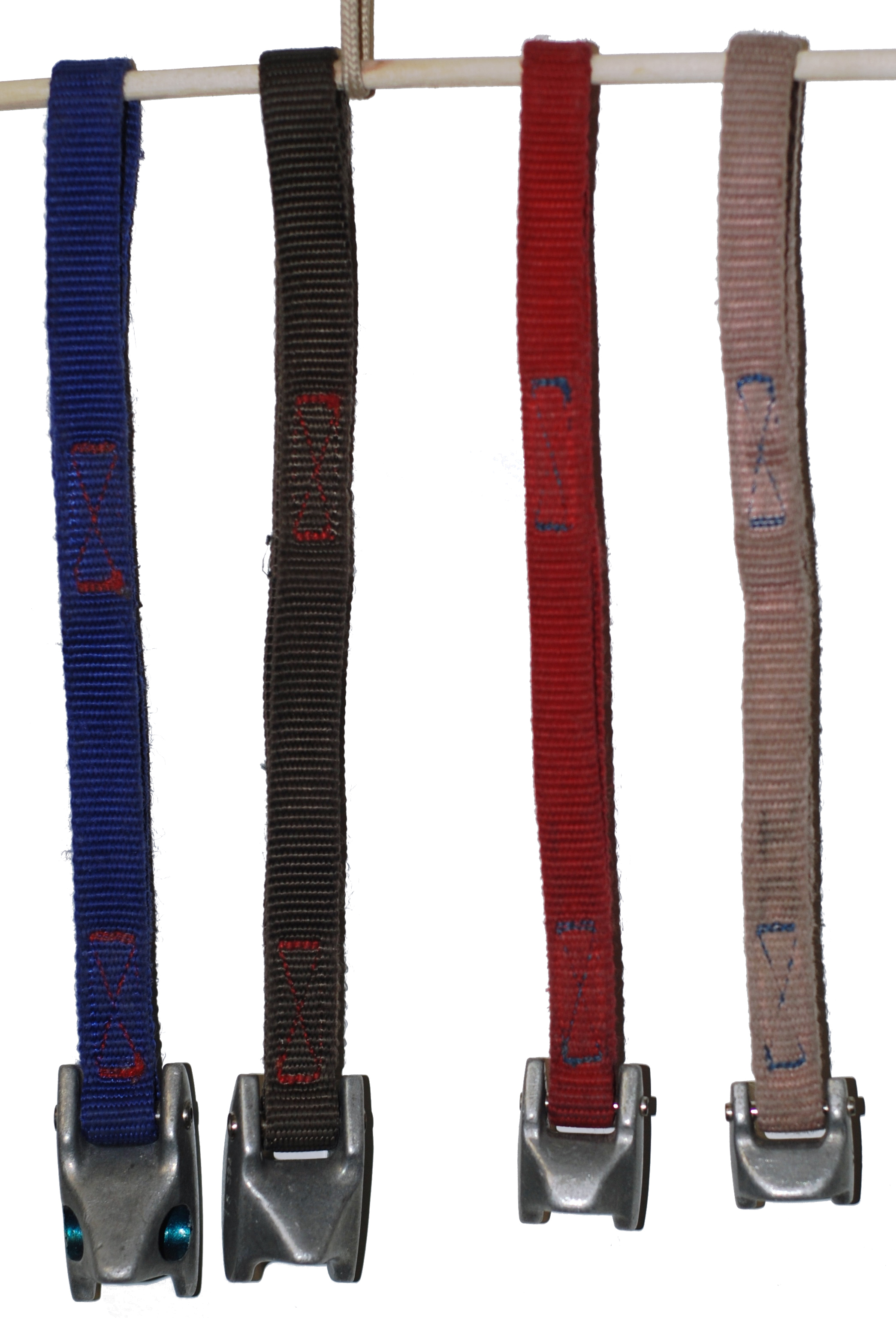
Tricams made by CAMP

CAMP (also spelled C.A.M.P. or Camp, acronym of Costruzione Articoli Montagna Premana, meaning "Premana Mountain Equipment Manufactory") is an Italian manufacturer of equipment for climbing and associated activities such as ski mountaineering and industrial safety (i.e., working at heights).

CAMP manufactures a wide range of products, including ice axes, crampons, ice screws, pitons, carabiners, nuts, tricams, camming devices, harnesses, helmets, ropes, rucksacks, tents, ski-racing clothing, and various snow tools.

The company was founded by Nicola Codega, a blacksmith, in 1889 in the Italian alpine village of Premana, where it is still based. Originally producing wrought-iron goods, an order in 1920 for ice axes for the Italian army was their first foray into the world of climbing equipment. From there the company extended its climbing range to include crampons, pitons, and nuts, and eventually (with the encouragement of mountaineer Riccardo Cassin and collaboration with American climber and entrepreneur Greg Lowe) into non-metallic equipment. The company is still run by Codega's descendants.
