= Ryan Gellert =

American business executive (born 1972)

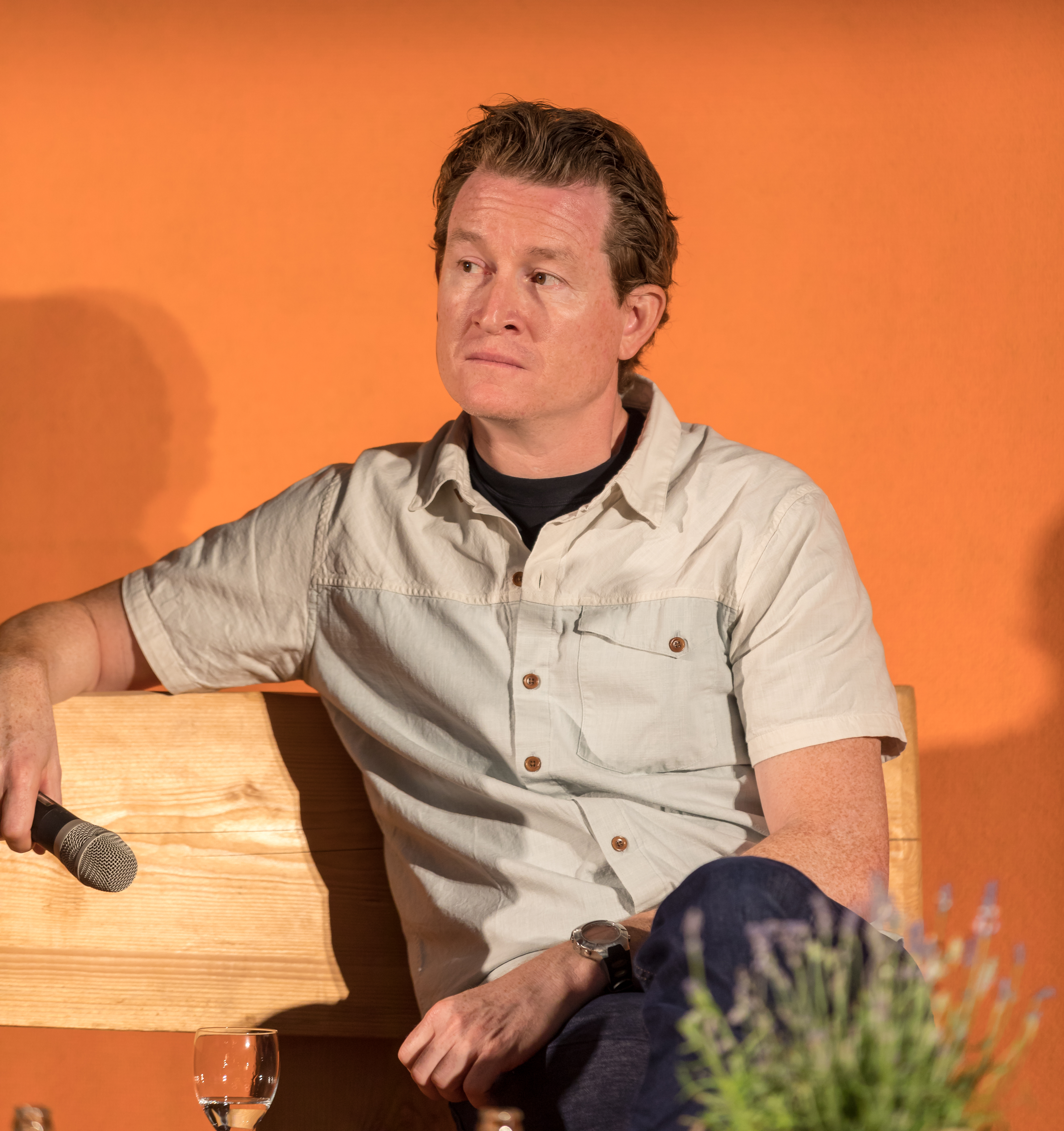
- Born: January 3, 1972 (age 54)
- Education: University of North Carolina at Charlotte (BSBA); Florida Institute of Technology (MBA); University of Utah (JD)
- Occupation: Businessperson
- Employers: Black Diamond Equipment; Patagonia, Inc.
- Title: Chief Executive Officer

Ryan Gellert (born January 3, 1972) is an American business executive who is the chief executive officer of Patagonia, Inc. as of September 2020. Previously, he was the manager of EMEA - Patagonia for the European market. Prior to working at Patagonia, Gellert worked 15 years at Black Diamond Equipment, where he was president since 2012.

== Early life and education ==
Gellert grew up in Cocoa Beach, Florida, where he attended Cocoa Beach High School. He earned a Bachelor of Science in Business Administration in Finance from the University of North Carolina at Charlotte in 1994, a Master of Business Administration from the Florida Institute of Technology in 1996, and a juris doctor from the University of Utah S.J. Quinney College of Law in 2005.

== Career ==
In September 2020, Gellert was appointed to CEO of Patagonia, Inc. after six years of leading Patagonia's European operations.

== Personal life ==
Gellert is married, with two children, and lives in Santa Barbara County, California.
