= Camalot =

Spring-loaded camming device

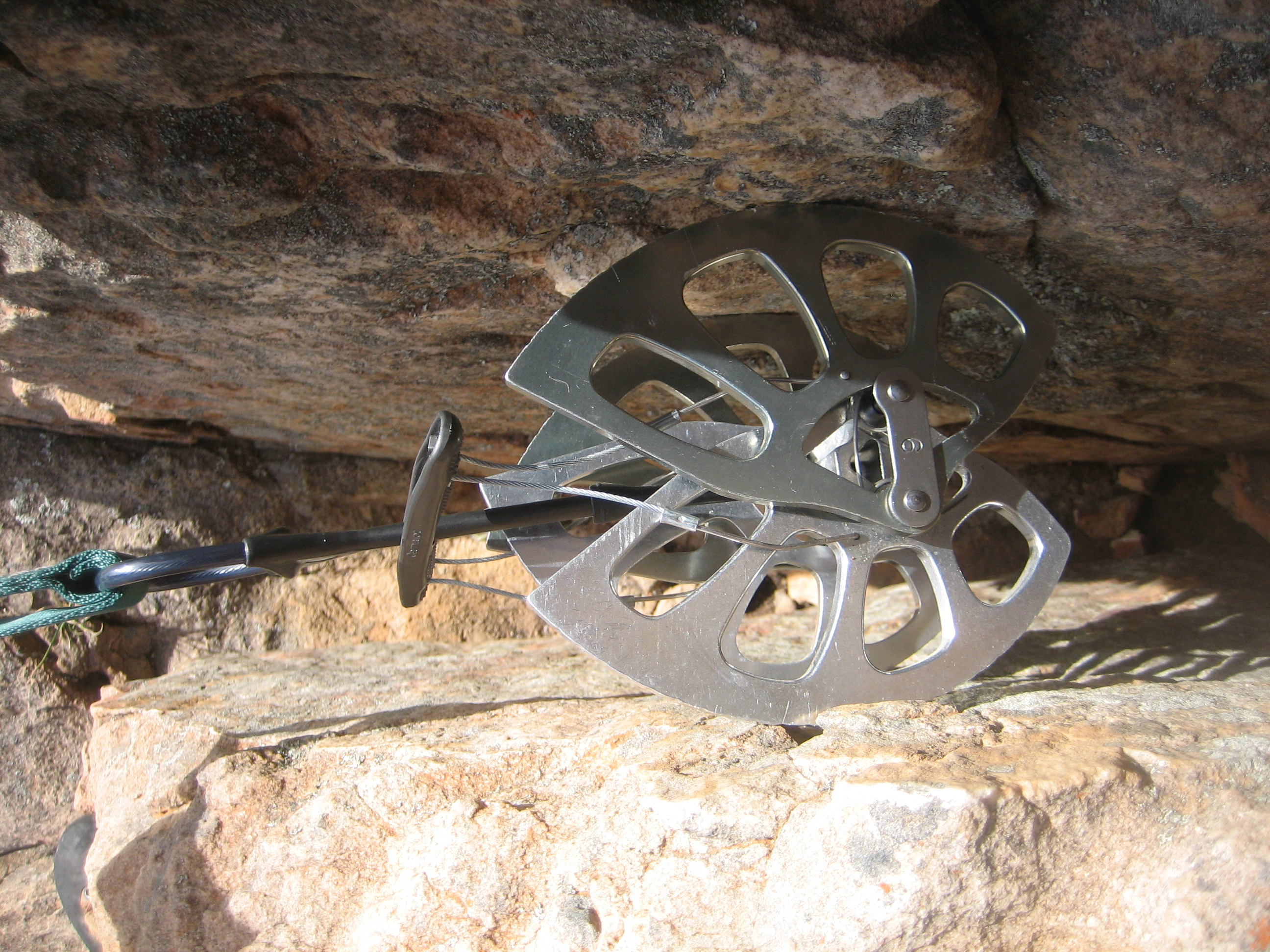
A #6 Camalot C4 placed in a crack.

Camalot is a brand of spring-loaded camming devices manufactured by Black Diamond Equipment used to secure ropes while rock climbing. Camalots use a dual-axle system, resulting in a slightly higher expansion range than similarly sized single axle units, however that results in significant weight penalty. Dual-axle was patented and for decades was only used by Black Diamond, however the patent expired in 2005 and several other manufacturers began producing dual-axle cams, often also replicating Camalots sizes and coloring. Most notable Camalot look-alikes include DMM Dragons and Wild Country's New Friends.

Like other cams, Camalot lobes are in the shape of a logarithmic spiral, resulting in a constant angle between the cam and the rock at each contact point; this constant angle is designed to always provide the necessary friction to hold a cam in equilibrium.

== Models ==
Black Diamond has produced several different models of Camalots:

image	name, sizes and year of introduction	description
	Camalot (Chouinard) #1 to #4; 1987	The original Chouinard Camalots using U-stem design and 7075-T6 aluminum cams and three part plastic sleeve. Those cams used ball shaped swages attaching the axle housing to the cable stem, and those when weighted could cause cracking in the axle housing compromising the strength of the piece. The ball design was changed in later units. US patent number 4643377.
	Camalot (Black Diamond) #1 to #4; 1989	First Black Diamond Camalots with single plastic molded sleeve and slight changes to axle housing to prevent cracking affecting the original cams.
	Camalot junior #0.5 to #0.75; 1991-2000	Last U-stem design Camalot was using injection molded Zyntel thumb loop. The original 1991 version didn't have sewn slings, which were introduced in 1994.
	Camalot #1 to #5; 1994	First T-stem design Camalots switched to 6061-T6 aluminum alloy and introduced sewn nylon slings. Sizes #1 to #4 were first released in 1994, #5 in 1995 and #3.5 & #4.5 in 1999. Initially 1994 cam used continuous plastic sleeve which had no trigger keep, preventing the trigger from sliding up into the cam lobes. This was corrected in 1995 by adding an aluminum ring to the sleeve, and further refine this in 2000 by adding a small injection molded ring in place of the aluminum ring.
	Micro Camalot #0.1 to #0.75; 2000	Micros replaced 1991 juniors and switched to a single T-stem design. Smallest micros used single-axle while larger ones use the iconic double axle design.
	Camalot C4 #0.4 to #6; 2005	4th version of the single stem Camalot which intruduced thumb-loops and changed sizes of cams larger than #3. Camalots #3.5, #4, #4.5 and #5 were replaced with resized #4, #5 and #6. US patent number 7959118/7959119
	Camalot C3 #0000 to #2; 2006 (or 2007) - 2018	Designed for placements in very small cracks, with a single axle and a narrow, three-lobed head. US patent number 7275726/7278618
	Camalot X4 #0.1 to #0.75 Spring 2013 - 2020	With smaller heads and flexible cable stems, X4 were designed for placement in very small cracks. The X4 were discontinued with the released of the Z4. US patent number 9079065/9302154
	Camalot X4 Offsets #0.1/#0.2 to #0.5/#0.75; 2014 - 2020	A version of the X4 with heads of two different sizes for flaring cracks or other asymmetric placements. Available in sizes #0.1/#0.2, #0.2/#0.3, #0.3/#0.4, #0.4/#0.5, #0.5/#0.75. Now discontinued with the released of the Z4.
	Camalot Ultralight #0.4 to #4; 2016	a lighter-weight version of the C4 with a core made of dyneema instead of steel. The 25-30% weight reduction come at the cost of higher prices and shorter lifespan. US patent number 2015/0290499
	Camalot C4 #0.3 to #8; 2019	Version of the 2005 model, updated in early 2019 to modernize and lower the weight. In April 2020, Black Diamond introduced the #7 and #8 C4s, the largest and most expensive Camalots ever built. The cams were initially teased with an April Fool's Day video of Alex Honnold supposedly placing a "#21" C4.
	Camalot Z4 #0.0 to #0.75; 2020	A replacement for the X4 and C3 as Black Diamond's small-sized cams. Available in sizes #.0, #.1, #.2, #.3, #.4, #.5, #.75.
	Camalot Z4 Offsets #0.1/#0.2 to #0.5/#0.75; Feb 2020	Similar to the older discontinued X4 Offset this newer version a combination of the two different sized head from the X4 Offset and the compact lobes of the Z4. Available in sizes #0.1/#0.2, #0.2/#0.3, #0.3/#0.4, #0.4/#0.5, #0.5/#0.75.
