= Rose Marcario =

American businessperson and CEO

Rose Marcario is the former CEO of outdoor apparel company Patagonia. She currently sits on the boards of two companies: plant-based protein brand Meati and electric car maker Rivian. A founding governing board member of The Society To Protect Underground Networks, an NGO to protect and harness the mycorrhizal networks that regulate the Earth's climate and ecosystems, Marcario is a vocal supporter of environmental activism, fair labor practices, and corporate transparency.

== Biography ==
Rose Marcario earned a BS in Business and Finance from the University of Albany and an MBA at California State University, Los Angeles. She then spent 15 years in private equity.

Rose Marcario joined Patagonia in 2008 as CFO. Marcario has been a vocal supporter of on-site child care, which Patagonia established in 1983. Under her leadership, 100 percent of the company's working mothers have returned to work after giving birth. On June 1, 2017, Marcario opened an on-site child care facility at Patagonia's distribution center in Reno, Nevada. Marcario believes that employer-operated child care facilities are the answer to getting more women on company boards and in CEO positions.

On June 10, 2020, Marcario announced she was stepping down as president and chief executive officer of Patagonia, effective June 12, 2020. She was included in the 2021 and 2022 Fast Company Queer 50 lists. In 2020 she joined the boards of two private companies: Meati, which makes plant-based meat, and Rivian, which makes electric cars.

As of 2023, Marcario is also a partner at ReGen Ventures, a venture capital firm focused on regenerative technology.

== Political involvement ==
In February 2016, Marcario and Patagonia founder Yvon Chouinard made a public statement about the company's commitment to public lands by choosing to withdraw the company's participation from the annual Outdoor Retailer trade show. The show was hosted in Salt Lake City, Utah, and Marcario and Chouinard said they were protesting Utah Governor Gary Herbert's attempts to rescind the Bears Ears National Monument. Marcario's decision to use the company's participation in Outdoor Retailer as a bargaining tool to change Herbert's stance on public lands spurred a boycott of the trade show. Marcario and Patagonia said the brand would boycott the show, one of Salt Lake City's most profitable annual conventions, unless the state's elected officials backed down on their efforts to rescind Bears Ears. Many other companies said they, too, would boycott the show in solidarity with Patagonia, which caused Outdoor Retailer and the Outdoor Industry Association to seek a new home for the show in a state deemed more friendly to public lands.

On Election Day 2016, Marcario closed all Patagonia retail locations in an effort to encourage people to make time to vote. Four days after the inauguration of President Donald Trump, she spoke out against the Trump administration and in defense of public lands and the fight against climate change. Patagonia has sought to mobilize its customers over Trump's executive order to reduce some national monuments, particularly Bears Ears National Monument, and has sued the Trump administration over the matter.
