= Mark Vallance =

British rock climber and company founder

Mark Vallance (1946 – 19 April 2018) was a British rock climber, mountaineer and founder of Wild Country, a climbing equipment company.

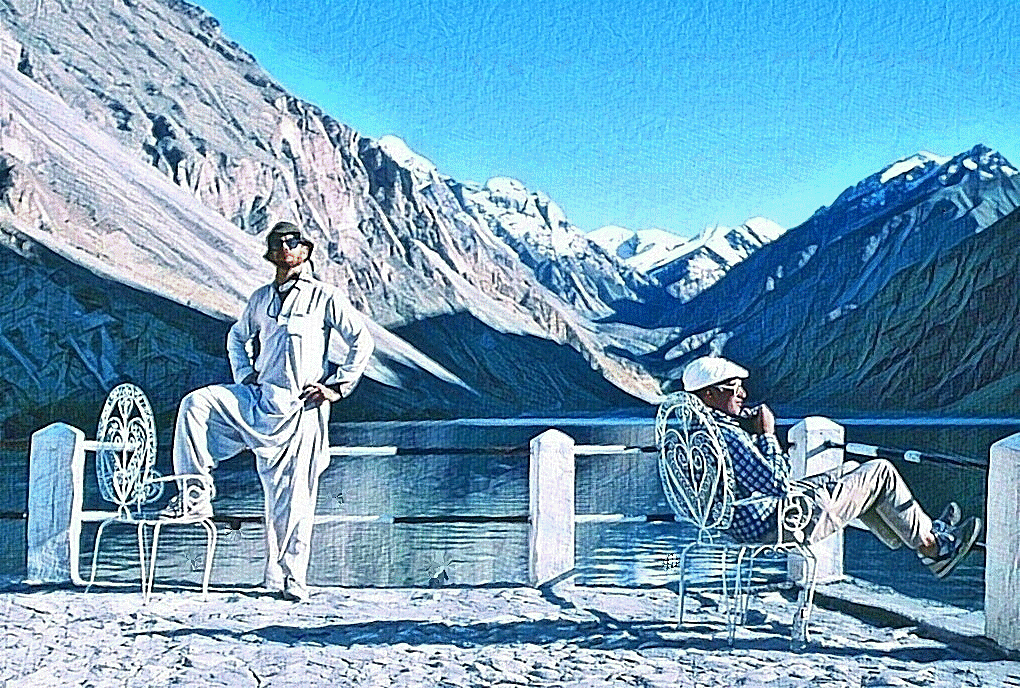
Mark Vallance (right) at Satpara Lake launching Broad Peak expedition

== Founder of Wild Country ==
He was instrumental in the design and development of a range of new equipment. American climber Ray Jardine, a climbing partner, had developed the first SLCD which were called "friends" by Yosemite climbers who had seen Jardine's climbs. Vallance took out a second mortgage on his house around 1977 so that he and Ray could produce "friends". A particularly successful design was a spring-loaded camming device branded the 'Friend'. It was revolutionary as a form of climbing protection, enabling climbers to tackle routes involving parallel or flared cracks in relative safety.

== Mountaineering career ==
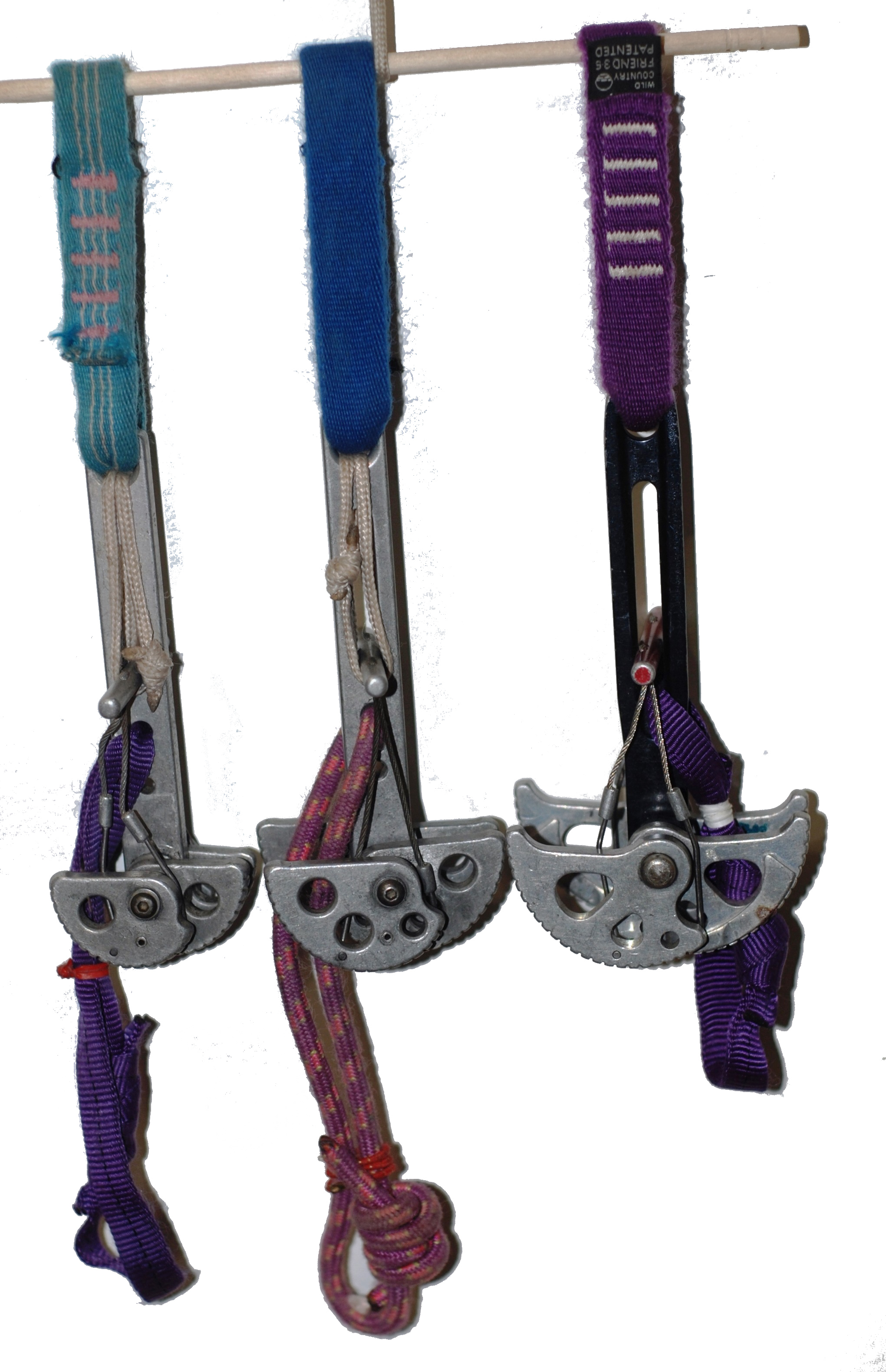
Wild Country rigid Friend cams

Vallance was a member of numerous Himalayan climbing expeditions, including one to Broad Peak.

== Wider climbing roles ==
Vallance was co-founder and part of the build team of the Foundry Climbing Wall in Sheffield—the first modern climbing wall in the UK. Vallance started the retailer Outside in the Peak District.

He served on the board of the Peak District National Park and was president of the British Mountaineering Council.

== Writer ==
Vallance's book, Wild Country: The Man Who Made Friends was shortlisted for the Boardman Tasker Prize for Mountain Literature. The prize is awarded annually to the author or authors of the best literary work, whether fiction, non-fiction, drama or poetry, the central theme of which is concerned with the mountain environment.

== See also ==
- Yvon Chouinard, founder of Patagonia
