= Patagonia, Inc. =

American clothing retailer

- Type: Private benefit corporation
- Industry: Apparel
- Founded: May 9, 1973; 53 years ago
- Founder: Yvon Chouinard
- Headquarters: Ventura, California, U.S.
- Key people: Ryan Gellert, CEO; Charles R. Conn, Chair
- Products: Outdoor clothing
- Revenue: $1.5 billion (2022 estimate)
- Number of employees: 3,000 (2024)
- Website: patagonia.com

Patagonia, Inc. is an American retailer of outdoor recreation clothing, equipment, and food. It was founded by Yvon Chouinard in 1973 and is based in Ventura, California. Patagonia operates stores in over ten countries, and factories in sixteen countries.

== History ==
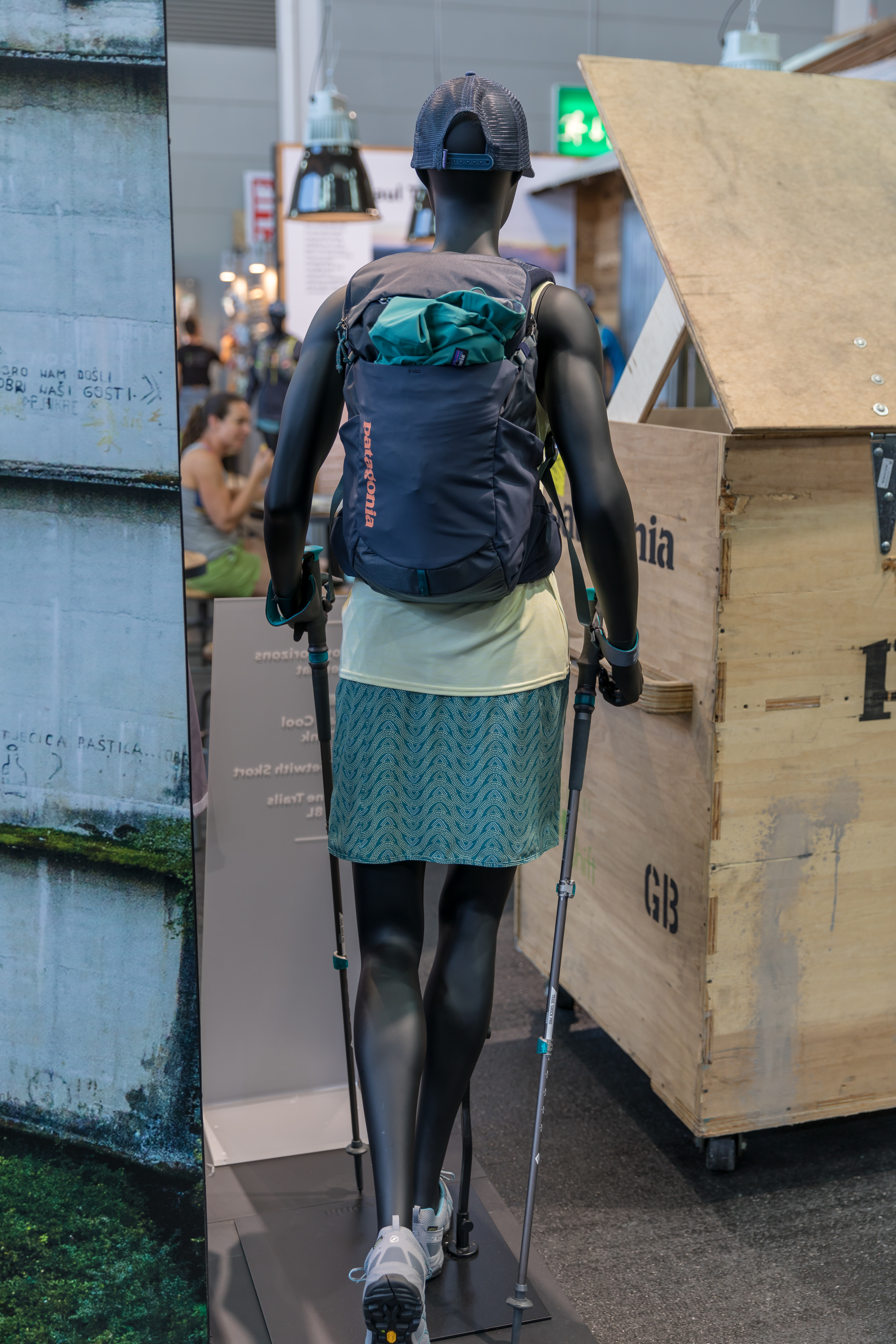
Mannequin dressed in Patagonia clothing and gear

Yvon Chouinard, an accomplished rock climber and big wall climber, began selling hand-forged rock-climbing equipment in 1957 through his company Chouinard Equipment. He worked alone selling his gear until 1965, when he partnered with Tom Frost in order to improve his products and address the growing supply and demand issue he faced. In 1970, Chouinard obtained rugby shirts from Scotland that he wore while climbing because the collar kept the climbing sling from hurting his neck. Great Pacific Iron Works, Patagonia's first store, opened in 1973 in the former Hobson meat-packing plant at Santa Clara St. in Ventura, near Chouinard's blacksmith shop. In 1981, Patagonia and Chouinard Equipment were incorporated within Great Pacific Iron Works. In 1984, Chouinard changed the name of Great Pacific Iron Works to Lost Arrow Corporation. In 1993, Patagonia became the first company to manufacture clothing using polyester sourced from recycled bottles.

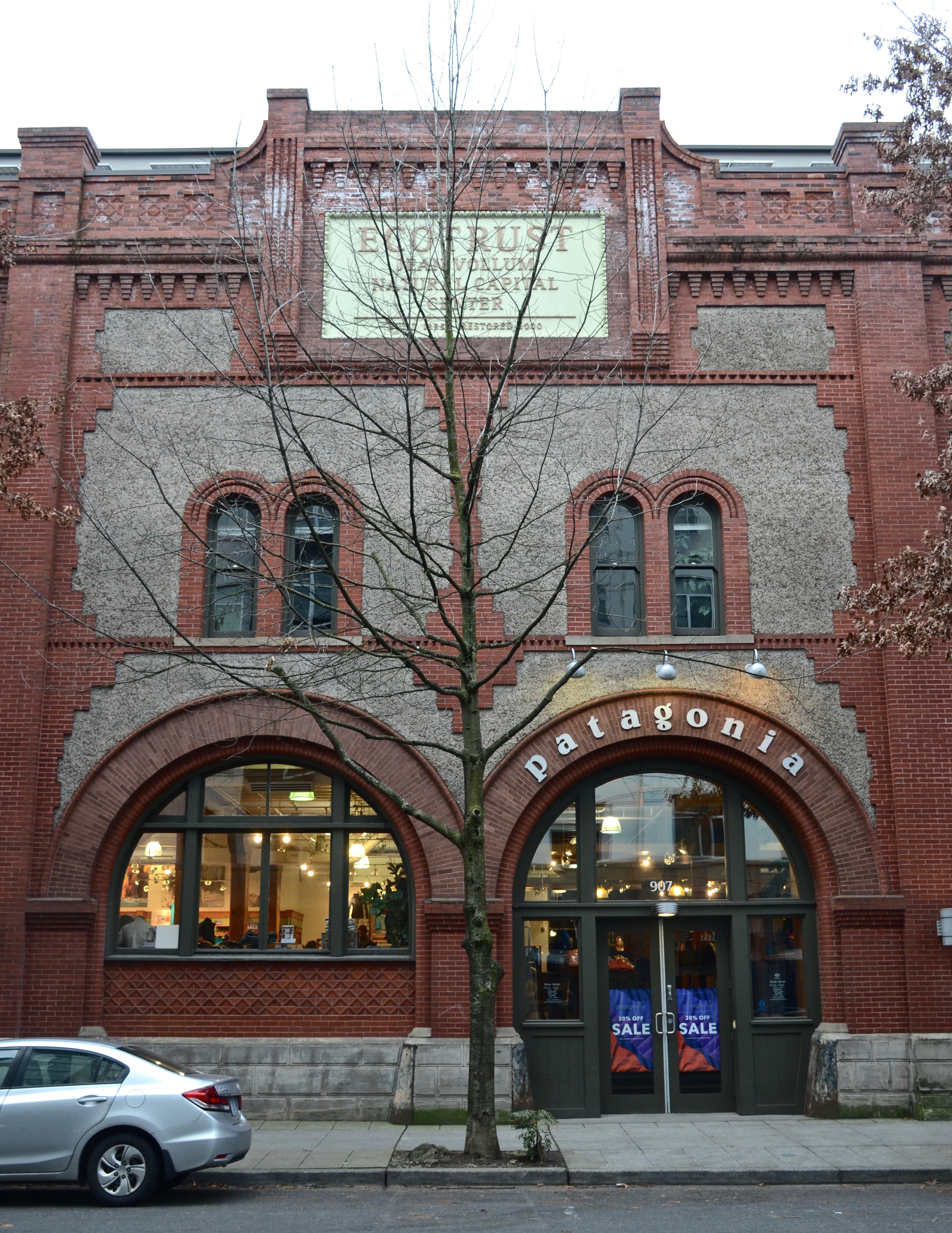
A Patagonia store in Portland, Oregon, was located in a renovated 1895-built former warehouse until moving to a new location in 2017.

In 2012, Patagonia created a new division called Patagonia Provisions to produce food products. In 2017, Patagonia created a trade-in and exchange program called Worn Wear. In 2019, Patagonia launched a program named ReCrafted that creates and sells clothing made from scraps of fabric coming from used Patagonia gear. The program promotes longer life spans for their clothing by providing sewing videos and/or the help of professionals via events in both the United States and Europe. By the late 2010s, branded Patagonia fleece vests became known for their use by financial executives, and in 2019, Patagonia announced that its distribution of branded products would focus on firms committed to environmental, social, and corporate governance initiatives.

In September 2020, Patagonia announced that Rose Marcario would step down as its chief executive officer and be succeeded by Ryan Gellert. By 2021, Patagonia announced that it would no longer produce its clothing with added corporate logos to improve garment life-spans.

In September 2022, Chouinard transferred ownership of Patagonia (all of its voting stock, about 2% of total stock) to the Patagonia Purpose Trust, a trust overseen by the Chouinard family and advisors. Chouinard's stated goal was for profits to be used to address climate change and protect land. All nonvoting stock was transferred to Holdfast Collective, a 501(c)(4) organization. The move allowed Chouinard to avoid taxation on the gift of the nonvoting shares since it was to a nonprofit holding company, while effectively maintaining control of the company via the affiliated trust's ownership of the voting stock, although a gift tax of $17 million was assessed on the transfer of the voting stock.

In January 2026, the company sued environmental activist and drag queen Pattie Gonia for $1 for trademark infringement. While the company provided images of Gonia using branding that closely resembled the Patagonia brand logo, the activist denied using the logo in merchandise.

=== Labor issues ===
In 2007 and 2011, internal audits revealed that factories in Patagonia's second-tier supply chain in Taiwan were involved in human trafficking, leading to company efforts to address the labor abuses. The Atlantic described the issue as "a sign not of corporate hypocrisy", but of the "near impossibility of treating workers well at every step in the production process, even when a company is genuine in its desire to do so." The Atlantic stated that the typical standard is for companies to monitor only their first-tier suppliers, but Patagonia is unusual in seeking to monitor their second-tier suppliers as well. In December 2021, the European Center for Constitutional and Human Rights filed a criminal complaint in a Dutch court against Patagonia and other brands, alleging that they benefited from the use of forced Uyghur labor in Xinjiang, China. Patagonia ended its relationship with cotton suppliers in China and switched to Peruvian sources in July 2020.

On 10 June 2023, a Dutch investigative journalism platform, Follow the Money, published an article about Patagonia's use of the same factories that fast-fashion brands use such as Decathlon and Primark. Workers in these factories work in far worse conditions than the standard that Patagonia publicly set; Patagonia claims it works with its suppliers to try to raise wages and meet working standards. In 2024, Patagonia was involved in a lawsuit over labor issues from employees of the company's Japanese branch.

== Social action ==
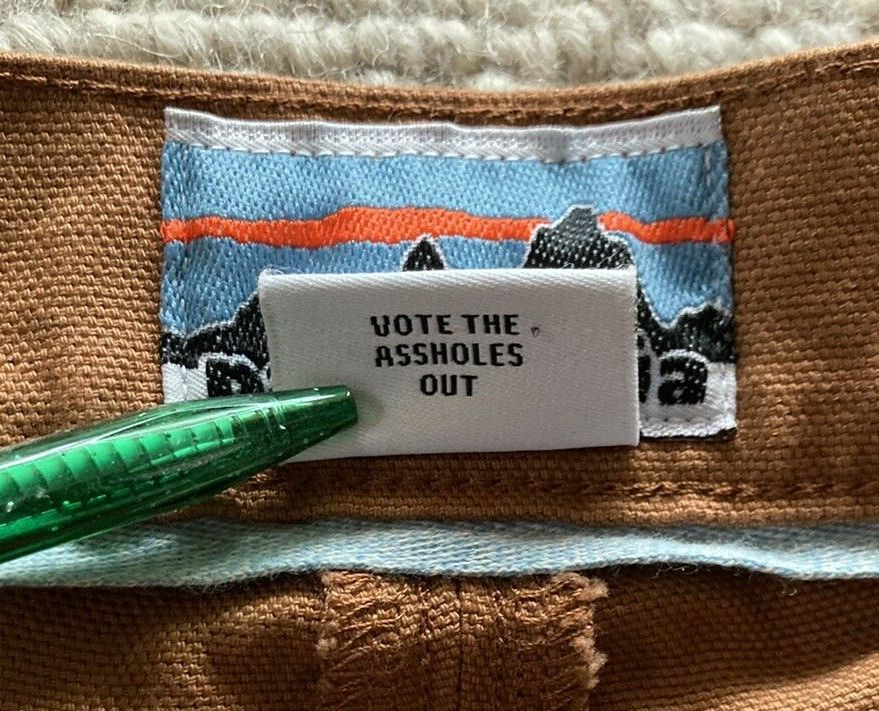
A Patagonia garment with a label saying "Vote the Assholes Out", which it featured in the lead-up to the 2020 United States elections.

Since 1985, Patagonia has committed 1% of its total sales to environmental groups through One Percent for the Planet, an organization of which Yvon Chouinard was a founding member.

In 2016, Patagonia pledged to contribute 100% of sales from Black Friday to environmental organizations, totaling $10 million.

In February 2017, Patagonia led a boycott of the Outdoor Retailer trade show, which traditionally took place in Salt Lake City, Utah, because of the Utah state legislature's introduction of legislation that would transfer federal lands to the state. Patagonia opposed then Utah Governor Gary Herbert's request that the Trump administration revoke the recently designated Bears Ears National Monument in southern Utah. After several companies joined the Patagonia-led boycott, event organizer Emerald Expositions said it would not accept a proposal from Utah to continue hosting the Outdoor Retailer trade show and would instead move the event to another state.

In 2017, Patagonia sued the United States Government and President Donald Trump for his proclamations of reducing the protected land of Bears Ears National Monument by 85% and the Grand Staircase–Escalante National Monument by almost 50%.

In June 2018, the company announced that it would donate the $10 million it received from President Trump's 2017 tax cuts to "groups committed to protecting air, land and water and finding solutions to the climate crisis."

In 2020, Patagonia joined other companies in the "Stop Hate for Profit" campaign; it suspended its advertising on Facebook and Facebook's photo-sharing app, Instagram.

In the lead-up to the 2020 United States elections, Patagonia began including labels in clothing with the message "Vote the Assholes Out", targeting politicians who endorse climate change denial. On April 5, 2021, Patagonia pledged $1 million to the activist groups Black Voters Matter and the New Georgia Project, regarding voter registration laws in Georgia.

== See also ==
- Business action on climate change
