= Wild in the Country (disambiguation) =

Wild in the Country is a 1961 film starring Elvis Presley.

It may also refer to:

- "Wild in the Country" (song), a song from the above-mentioned film
- Wild in the Country (festival), a music festival

== See also ==
- "Go Wild in the Country", a song by English band Bow Wow Wow
- Wild Country (disambiguation)
