= Wild Country (company) =

British manufacturer of rock climbing equipment

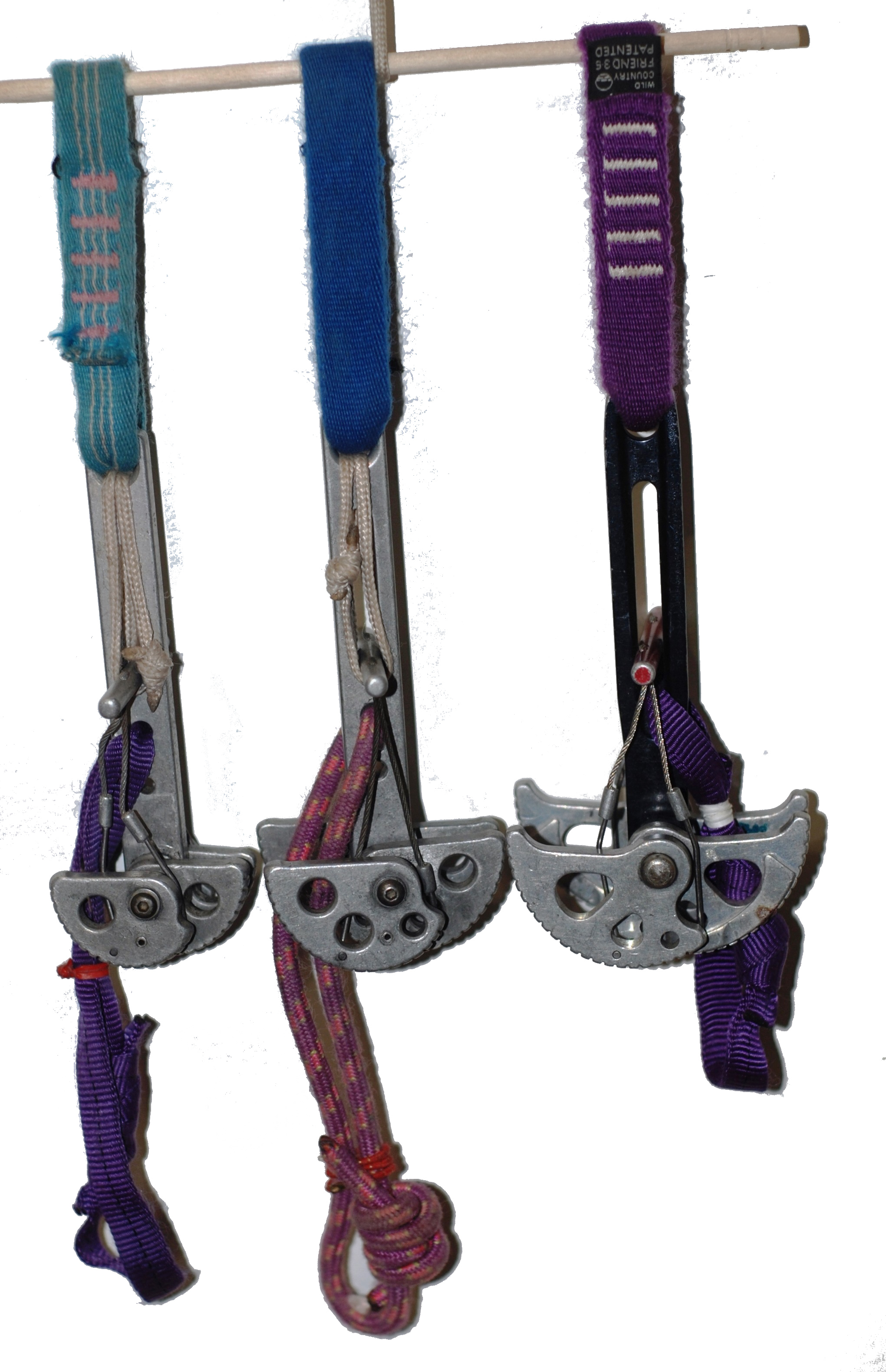
Wild Country rigid Friend cams: two from 1980s and one from 1990s.

Wild Country is a major manufacturer of rock-climbing equipment and is most noted for introducing the Friend, a spring-loaded camming device. The company is based in Tideswell in the English Peak District, close to some of the UK's most popular climbing areas.

== History ==
Wild Country was founded in 1977 by British climber Mark Vallance, after he met American climber Ray Jardine, who had made and used prototypes of the camming devices he had invented, but couldn't find anyone to produce them in volume. Vallance and Jardine set up a factory in the Peak District to manufacture the devices which they initially called Friends.

The company started expanding its range of products to include climbing harnesses, nuts, carabiners, and other climbing equipment. In 1986, Wild Country acquired Clog, a Welsh climbing equipment manufacturer. The company also distributes various other international climbing brands in the UK.

In 1979, Vallance introduced the Wild Country Rocks; passive protection which used three contact points compared to the usual two of other designs. The range of classic nuts has now been superseded by anodized rocks, which feature coloured anodising on the material to make identification easier . Both these ranges are produced in China, though their smaller superlight range is still produced in the UK. For a while, they also produced tents, backpacks, and technical clothing.

In February 2012 Wild Country was bought by Italian climbing equipment manufacturer Oberalp.

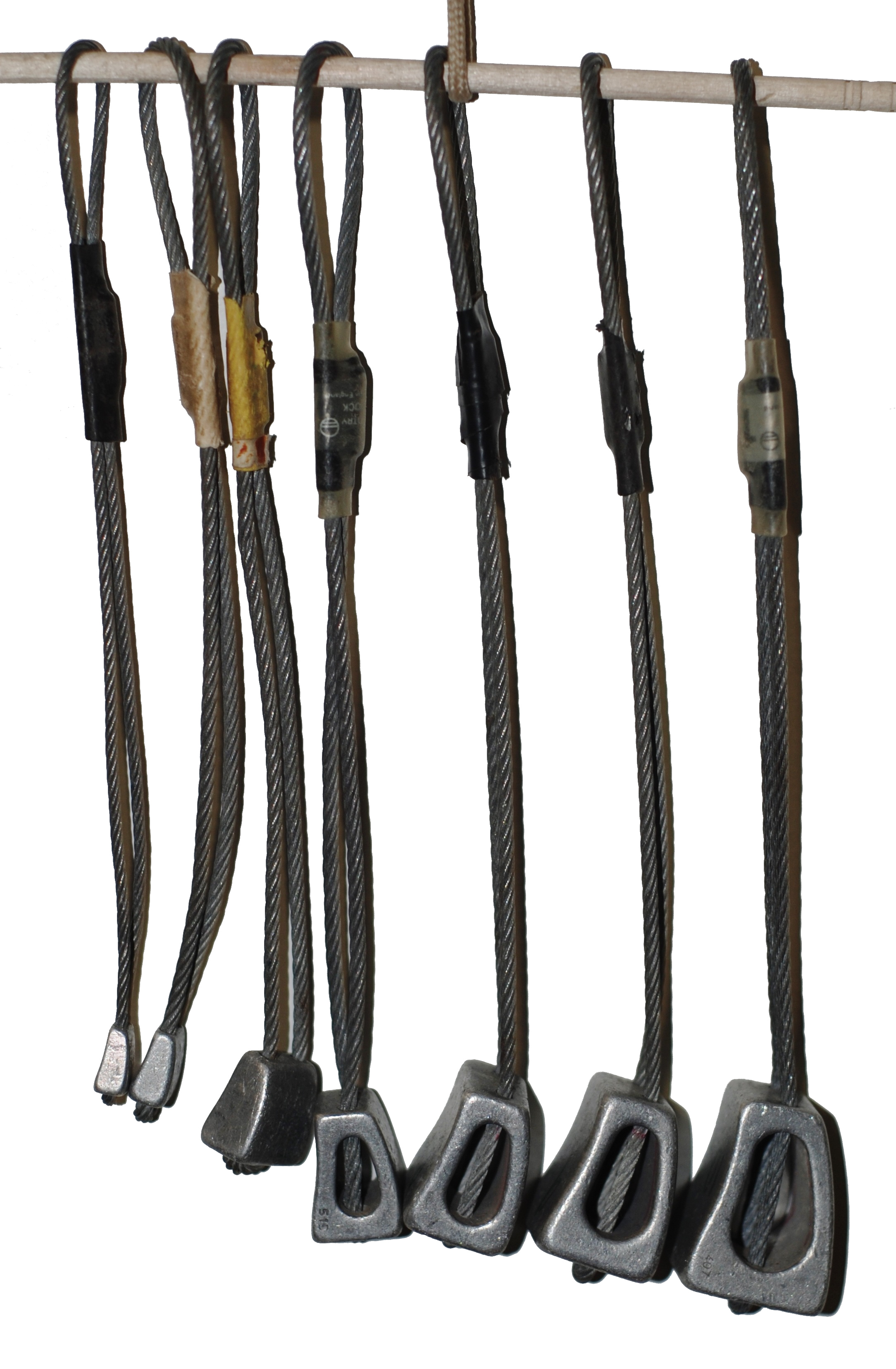
Wild Country Rock nuts from 1980s or 1990s.
