= Tricam =

Type of rock climbing protection

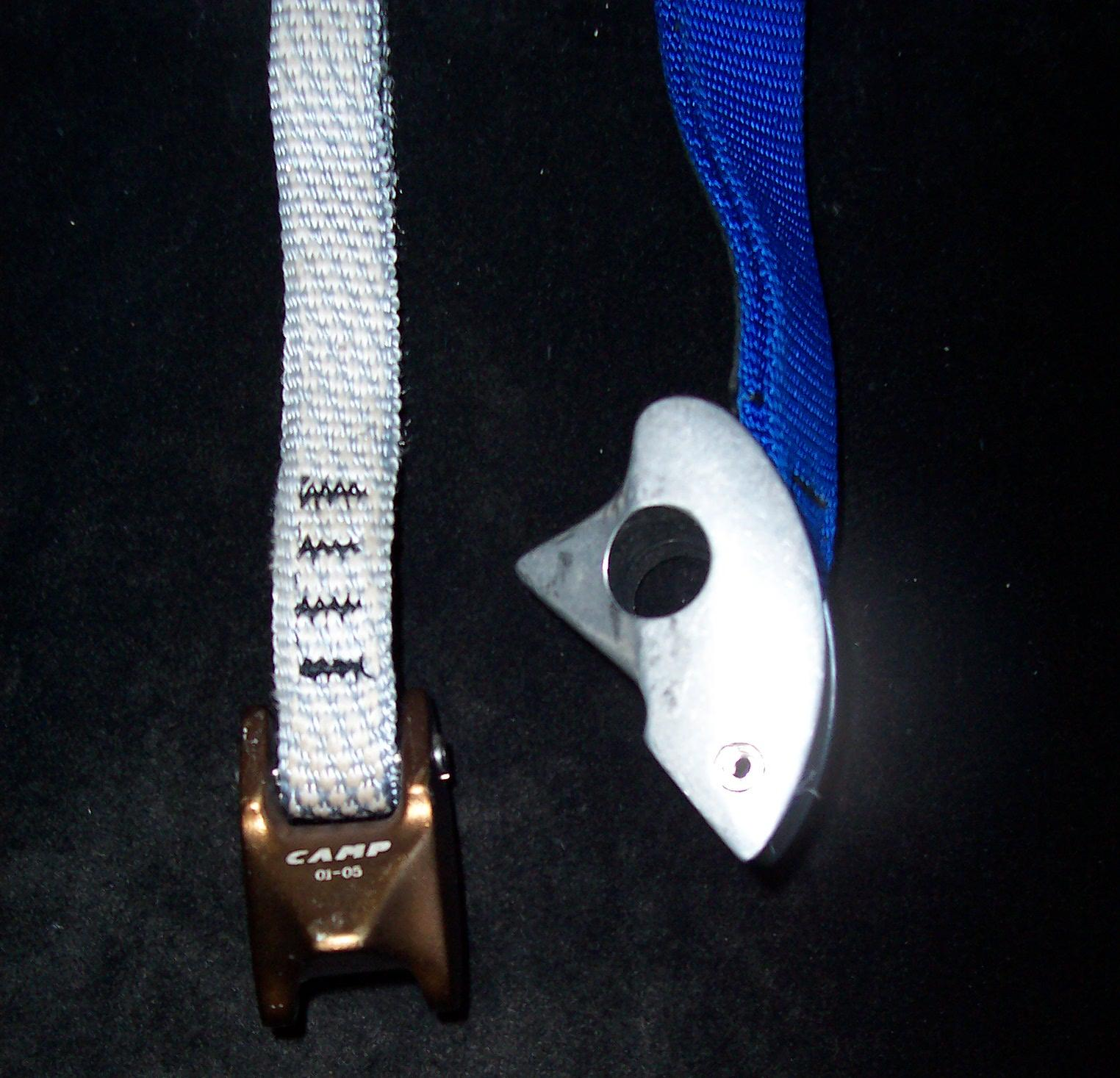
A pair of Tricams: on the right, a nylon size 2.0, and on the left, a Dyneema size 1.5.

A tricam is a type of climbing protection equipment. A versatile nut/cam hybrid, the Tricam was invented by Greg Lowe in 1973, and came to market in 1981. They are currently manufactured by C.A.M.P. of Premana Italy.

== Design ==
The Tricam is a passive camming device consisting of a carefully shaped aluminium-alloy cam attached to a length of webbing tape. Most sizes are produced as a solid forged unit, but the larger sizes are made from riveted sheet metal.

The device is inserted into a crack so that pulling on the tape makes the piece cam outward against the sides of the crack, gripping the rock tighter. Camming action is achieved by the position of the pointed fulcrum or pivot of the cam relative to the attachment of the tape. As the webbing is pulled, the downward force is pivoted onto the point, which can bite into soft rock or ice and increases the holding power of the tricam.

== Benefits ==
Tricams are not as easy to place or remove as spring-loaded camming devices (SLCDs) but are cheaper and lighter. Some cracks and pods too shallow to protect with SLCDs are easily protected with tricams. They have no moving parts to freeze, making them an excellent choice for a mountaineer's rack. They can also be used as nuts.

== Drawbacks ==
Placing a Tricam takes practice to achieve proficiency. Care must be taken so the Tricam does not loosen while climbing above it due to rope drag. Typically, this additional safety is provided by clipping a longer sling to the tricam. Tricams can "weld" into the placement after being subjected to a hard fall, making them hard to clean and likely to be left behind.

== Specifications ==
Tricams are available in a range of sizes to suit cracks from 10–140 mm wide. They are especially useful in horizontal cracks, quarry drill holes, and limestone pockets, where they may be the only type of protection that works. The smallest size can also work well in old piton scars.

As manufactured they come in size numbers 0.125 to 7, with strength 2–22 kN, width 10–140 mm, and weight 9–264 g.

== Gallery ==
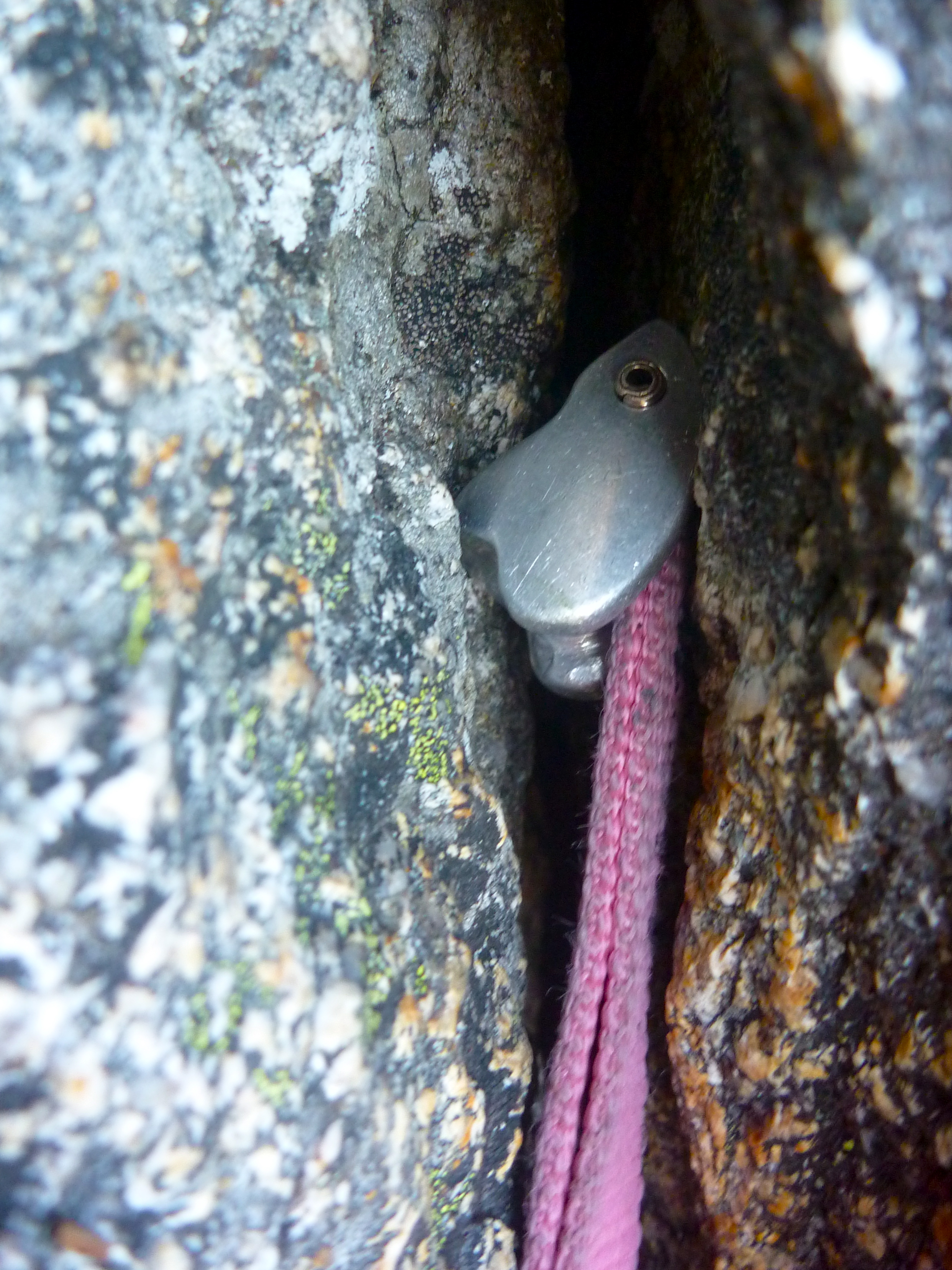
Typical placement of no. 0.5 Tricam

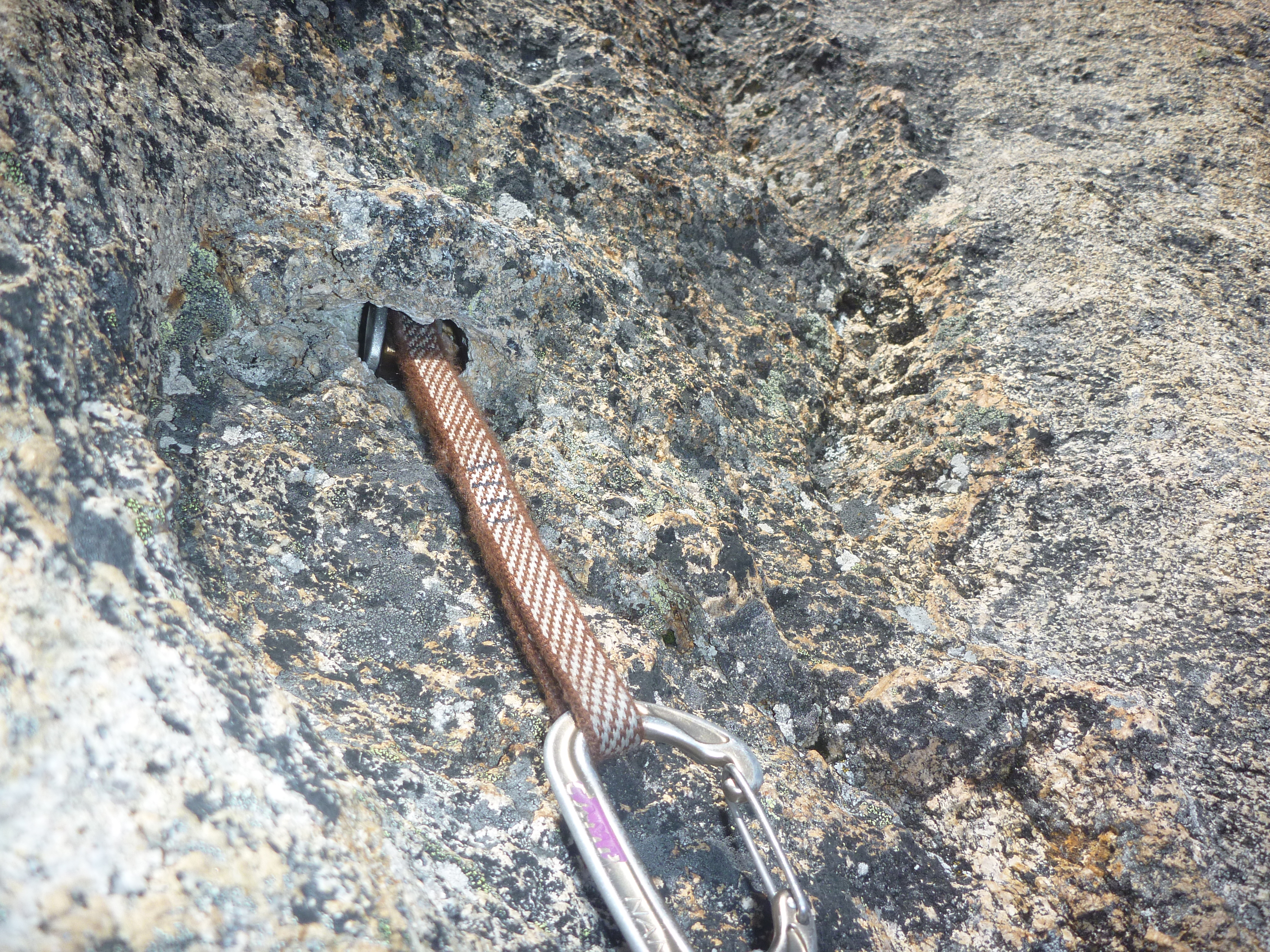
No. 1.5 Tricam in a placement where few other pieces would work

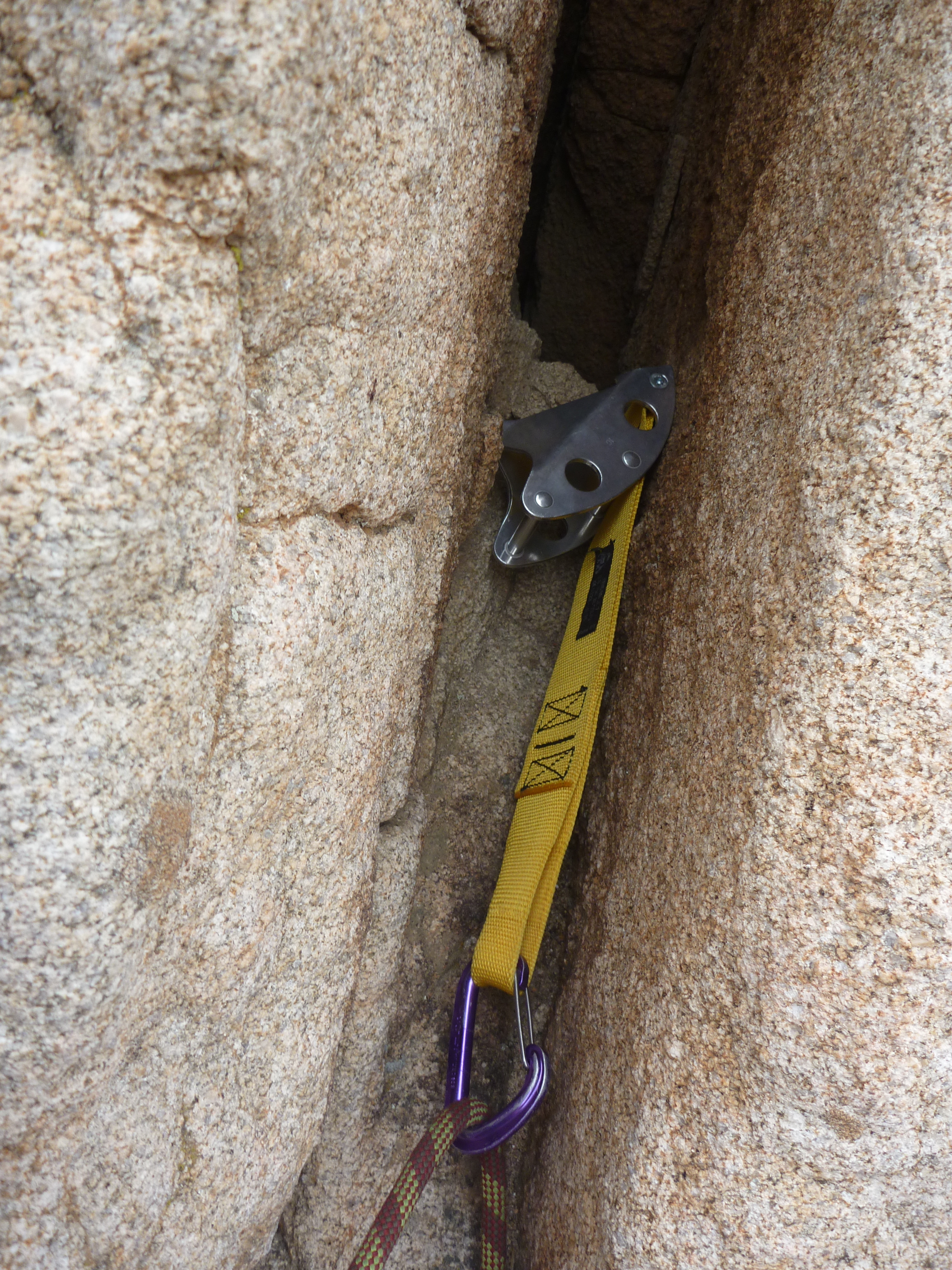
A no. 7 Tricam placed in a wide crack

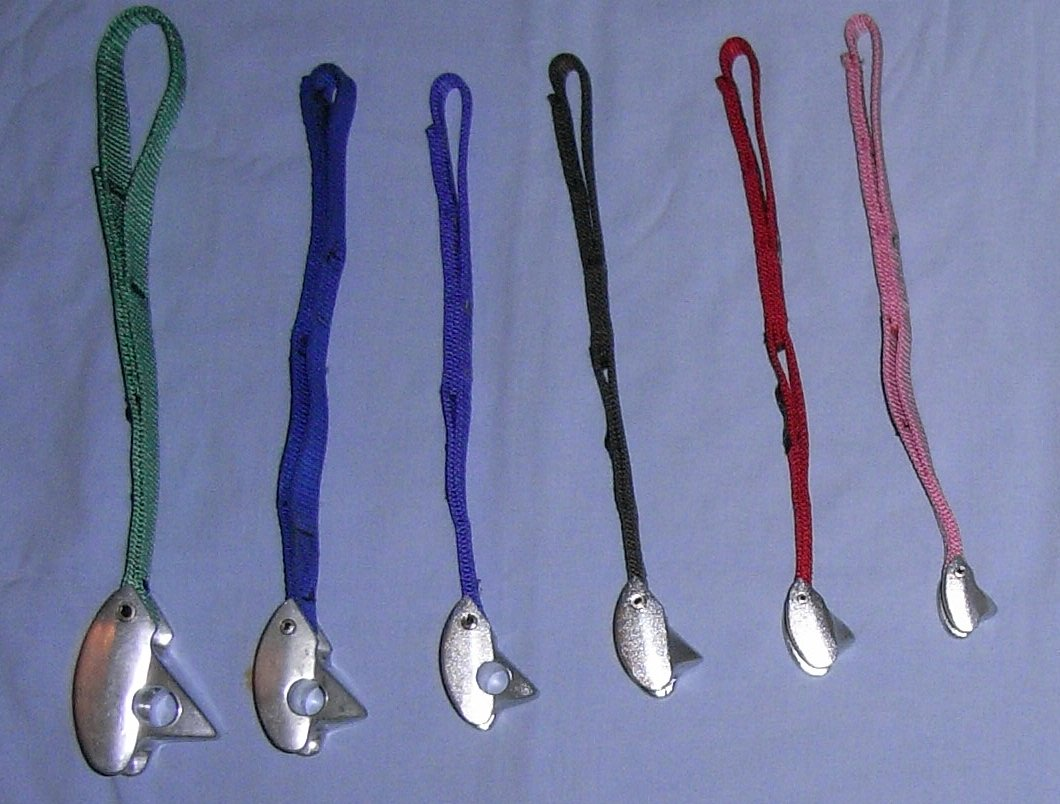
Set of Tricams
