= Ray Jardine =

American rock climber

Personal information
- Born: 1944 (age 81–82) Colorado Springs, Colorado, U.S.
- Occupation: Computer scientist

Climbing career
- Type of climber: Traditional climbing; Big wall climbing
- First ascents: The Phoenix (5.13a, 1977)
- Known for: First to climb consensus 5.13a (7c+); First to free climb the West Face of El Capitan; Inventor of spring-loaded camming devices ("friends")

Ray Jardine (born in 1944) is an American rock climber and rock-climbing equipment innovator, who specialized in traditional climbing and big wall climbing. In 1977, Jardine made the first free ascent of The Phoenix, which was the first-ever consensus route at the grade of 5.13a (7c+) in climbing history. In 1979, with Bill Price, he became the first to free climb the West Face of El Capitan in Yosemite Valley.

Jardine is noted for inventing and developing the spring-loaded camming devices (SLCDs, also called "Friends") with the late Mark Vallance, which revolutionized traditional climbing in the late 1970s. He is also noted for his major contributions to the ultralight backpacking community through his books and his "make-it-yourself" gear company, Ray-Way Products.

== Early life ==
Born in Colorado Springs, Colorado, as a youth, Jardine climbed Colorado's Pikes Peak dozens of times, mostly solo, and with the Boy Scouts of America. In 1959, Jardine achieved Eagle Scout (Boy Scouts of America). During his Junior and Senior years (1959-1961) at General William J. Palmer High School in Colorado Springs, Jardine competed in Gymnastics on the Trampoline. He worked part-time after school at his family's plumbing business.

In 1963, at the age of 19, Jardine took a summer job in Yellowstone National Park, and enrolled in his first rock climbing class with instructor Barry Corbet (member of the 1963 Mount Everest expedition), in Grand Teton National Park. In the fall of that year, Jardine enrolled at Northrop University in Los Angeles, California.

During the three years of his formal education at Northrop, Jardine worked evenings as a draftsman at North American Aviation in Los Angeles, California. In the spring of 1967 Jardine graduated from Northrop University with a degree in Aerospace Engineering.

== Professional life ==
Immediately following his graduation from Northrop University in 1967, Jardine was hired by Martin Marietta as a specialist in computer-simulated space-flight mechanics, shaping trajectories for earth satellite and interplanetary missions.

== Outdoor sports career ==
=== Rock climbing ===
He began his climbing career in 1963 in the Tetons and climbed in Eldorado Canyon State Park near Boulder, Colorado during the 1960s.

Jardine became active in Yosemite around 1970, and during the 1970s he materially pushed traditional climbing standards in Yosemite by creating new climbing routes that were of a grade never seen before. In 1977, Jardine made the first free ascent of The Phoenix, which was the first-ever consensus route at the grade of 5.13a (7c+) in climbing history. He used his new SLCDs on the route.

=== Sailing and SCUBA ===
In 1982, Ray and his wife Jenny sailed around the world in three years aboard their 41-foot ketch Suka (an acronym for "Seeking UnKnown Adventures"). During the voyage, they spent six months scuba diving and snorkeling in the Caribbean. Ray is a Professional Association of Diving Instructors (PADI) certified diver.

=== Hiking ===
In 1991 he discussed ideas related to backpacking with the publication of his PCT Hikers Handbook, which described hiking the entire Pacific Crest Trail in a much shorter time, using homemade lightweight gear and techniques including early start times with longer days and more mileage at a slower pace. The book was revised and retitled in 1999 as Beyond Backpacking, and revised and retitled again in 2009 as Trail Life.

In 1998, according to former GoLite owner Kim Coupounas, it was Ray Jardine who designed the original 12 lightweight backpacking products offered by the startup company, which had a royalty arrangement with Jardine in its early years.

=== Polar skiing ===
Starting on November 11, 2006, at the Patriot Hills Base Camp on Antarctica, Ray and his wife Jenny skied to the South Pole. They pulled sleds containing their gear and supplies. They traveled for 57 days, covered 750 miles, and reached the South Pole on January 8, 2007.

== See also ==
- List of grade milestones in rock climbing
- History of rock climbing
- Rock-climbing equipment
