= Black Diamond Equipment =

American outdoor sports equipment manufacturer

- Company type: Public
- Traded as: Nasdaq: CLAR
- Industry: Climbing and skiing equipment
- Founded: December 1, 1989; 36 years ago
- Headquarters: Holladay, Utah, US
- Key people: Neil Fiske (president)
- Parent: Clarus Corporation
- Website: blackdiamondequipment.com

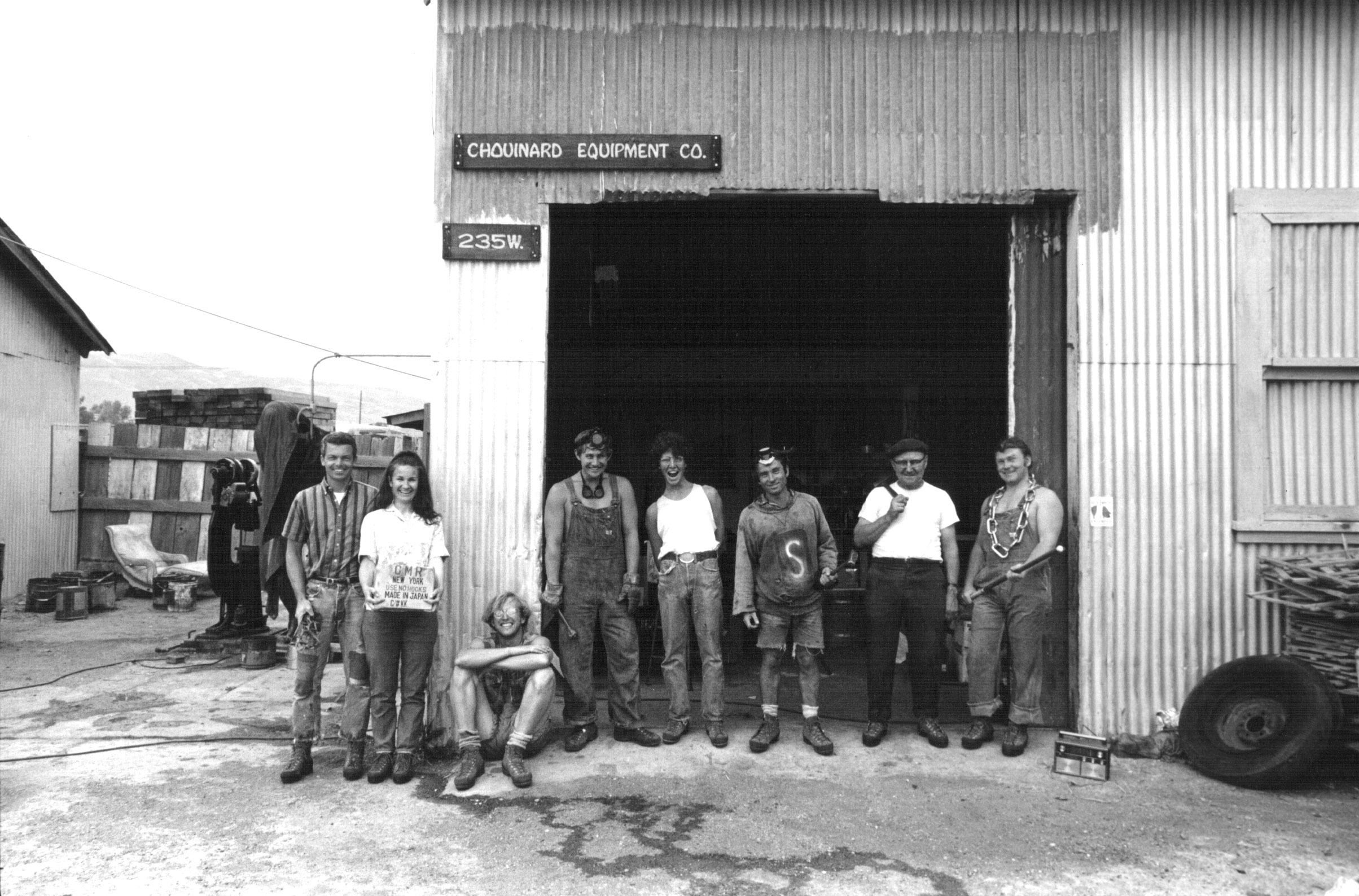
Chouinard Equipment Company, Ventura, California, 1969. Left to right: Tom Frost, Dorene Frost, Tony Jessen, Dennis Henneck, Terry King, Yvon Chouinard, Merle, and Davey Agnew.

Black Diamond Equipment is an American manufacturer of equipment for climbing, skiing, and mountain sports, based in Utah, United States. The company also has a global office in Innsbruck, Austria. The company is owned by Clarus Corporation, which also owns Pieps and ClimbOn! Skincare.

== History ==
Black Diamond Equipment's history dates from the late 1950s, when climber Yvon Chouinard began hand-forging pitons and selling them from the trunk of his car in Yosemite Valley. Chouinard's pitons quickly gained a reputation for quality, and Chouinard Equipment Ltd. was born soon after in Ventura, California.

In early 1989, after several product-liability lawsuits and a continued lack of profitability, Yvon Chouinard placed the company in Chapter 11 bankruptcy. Black Diamond was founded on December 1, 1989, when the assets of Chouinard Equipment Ltd. were purchased by a group of former company employees led by (now former CEO) Peter Metcalf, and a few outside investors. Metcalf moved the company and its 45 employees from Ventura, California, to the Salt Lake City, Utah, area in September 1991 to be closer to the climbing and skiing opportunities provided by the Wasatch Mountains.

In 1996, Black Diamond Equipment Europe was established in Reinach, Switzerland, making Black Diamond products more widely available throughout Europe. In 2006, Black Diamond Equipment Asia was established in Zhuhai, China to serve as both a secondary manufacturing facility and a global distribution hub. In May 2010, Black Diamond Equipment was acquired by Clarus Corporation for $90 million. The resulting corporation was renamed and is now publicly traded on the NASDAQ under the name CLAR.

In 2015, Black Diamond announced they would be expanding their Utah manufacturing facility. In 2016, they announced they would be moving their European headquarters from Reinach to Innsbruck in Austria.

In 2024, Black Diamond Equipment received third-party certification from UL Solutions verifying the use of recycled aluminum in several of its product lines.

== Products ==
Black Diamond Equipment design and manufacture products for climbing, skiing, and mountain sports. Climbing products include carabiners, quickdraws, harnesses, active and passive climbing protection, belay devices, helmets, ice tools and piolets, crampons, ice screws, bouldering pads, and big wall equipment. They also produce skiing and avalanche safety equipment. The company's mountain products include tents and shelters, lighting, trekking poles, and backpacks.

Over the years, Black Diamond has acquired and integrated several gear companies into its line, including Bibler tents (1997), Ascension climbing skins (1999), and Franklin climbing products (1998). In 2010, they acquired Gregory Mountain Products, a manufacturer of backpacks, but later sold it to luggage maker Samsonite in 2014.

Notable Black Diamond products include spring-loaded camming devices called Camalot and Magnetron carabiners, auto-locking carabiners that use magnets in the gate, and a steel insert in the carabiner's nose for added security.

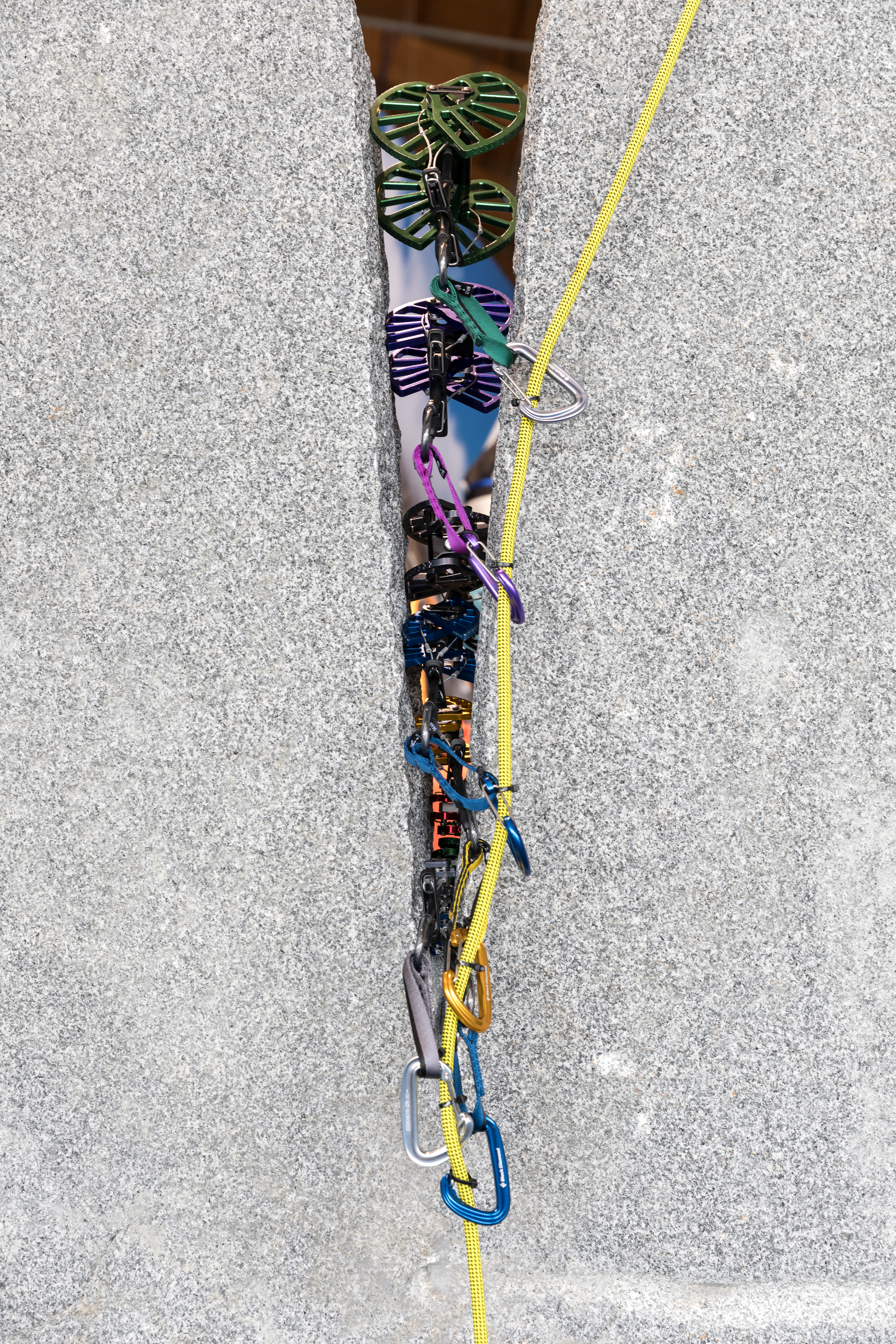

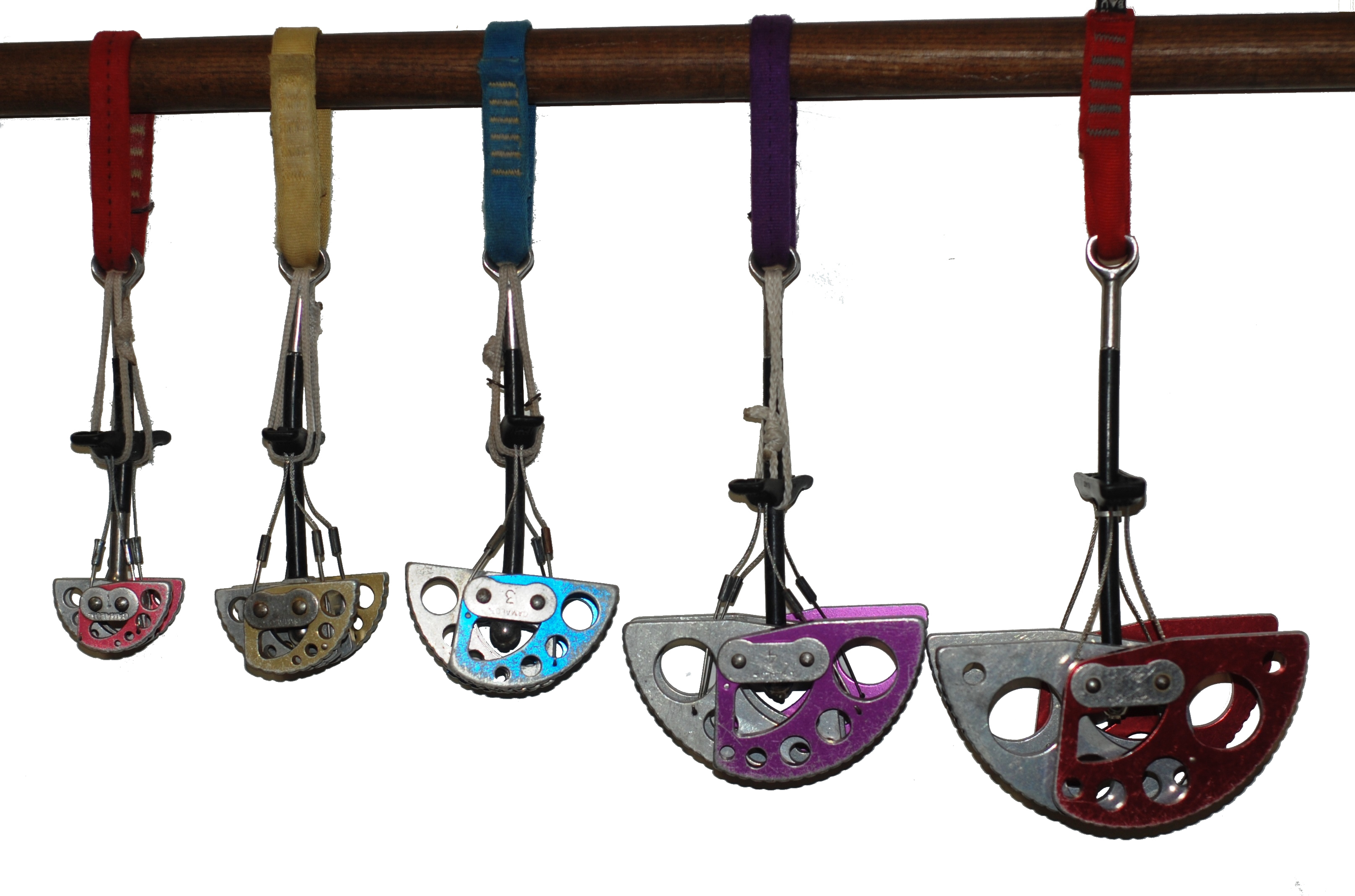
Black Diamond Camalot cams from around 2000

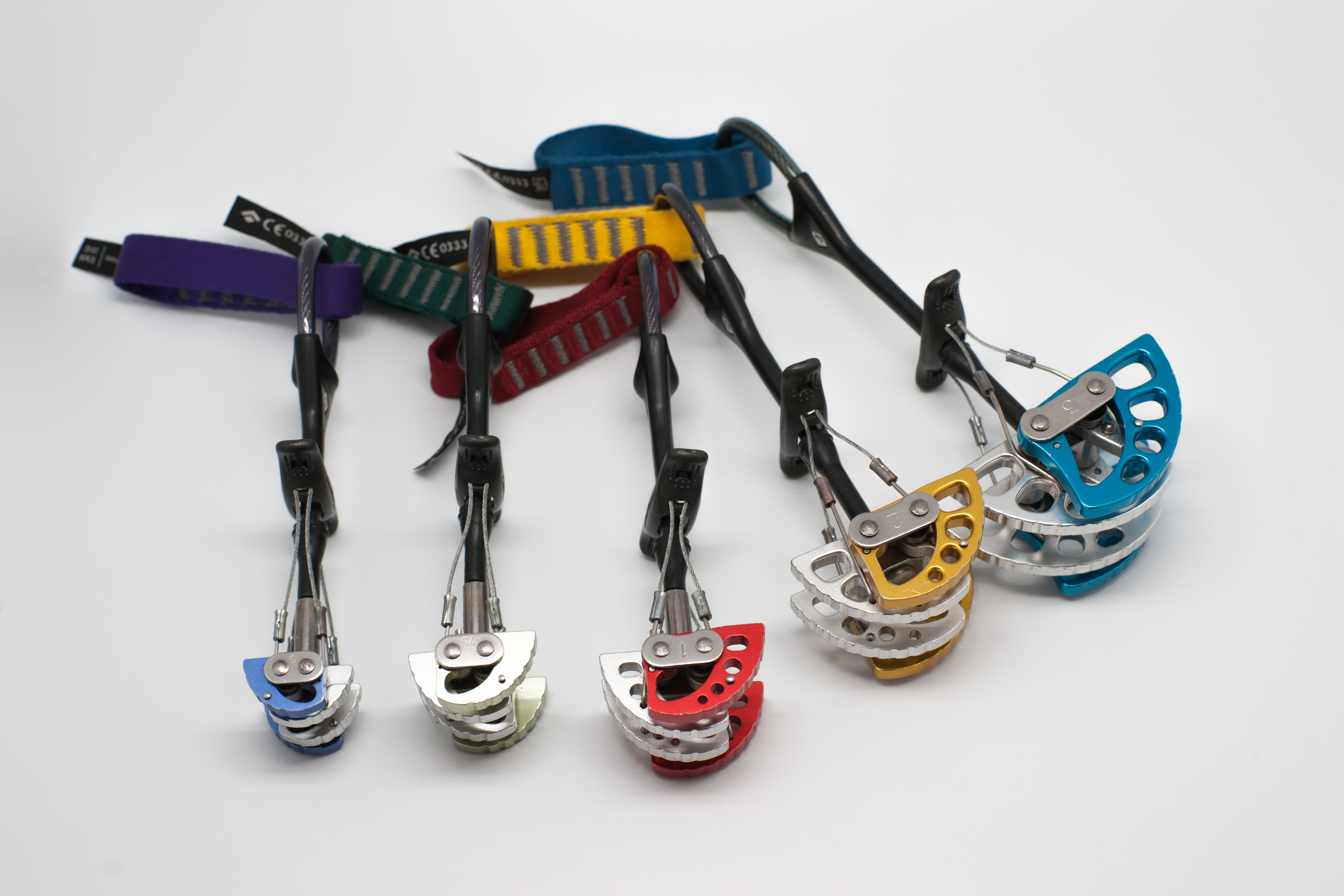
Black Diamond Camalot cams from 2010s

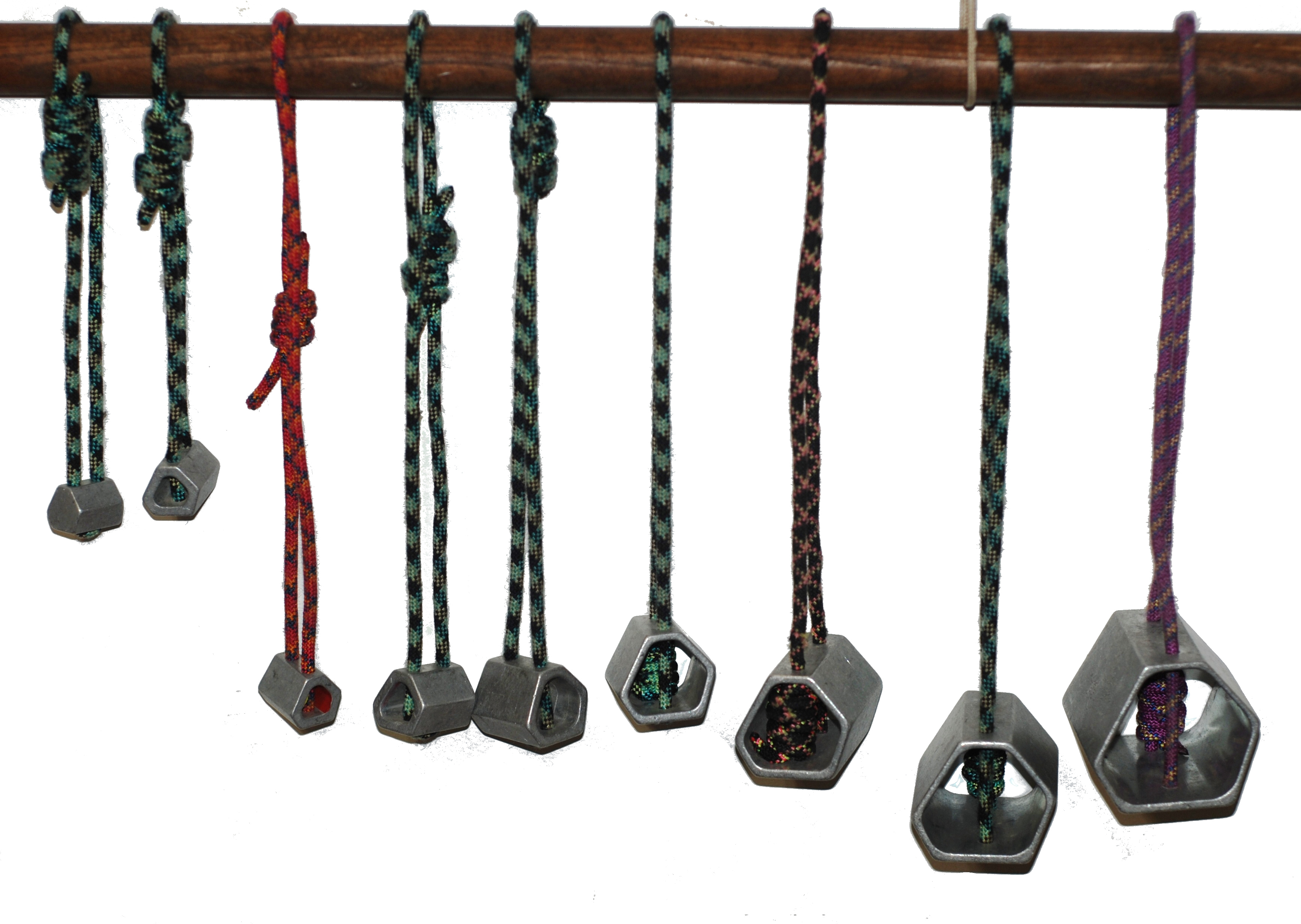
Black Diamond Hexes from around 1990s still followed design similar to Yvon Chouinard and Tom Frost patent from 1976

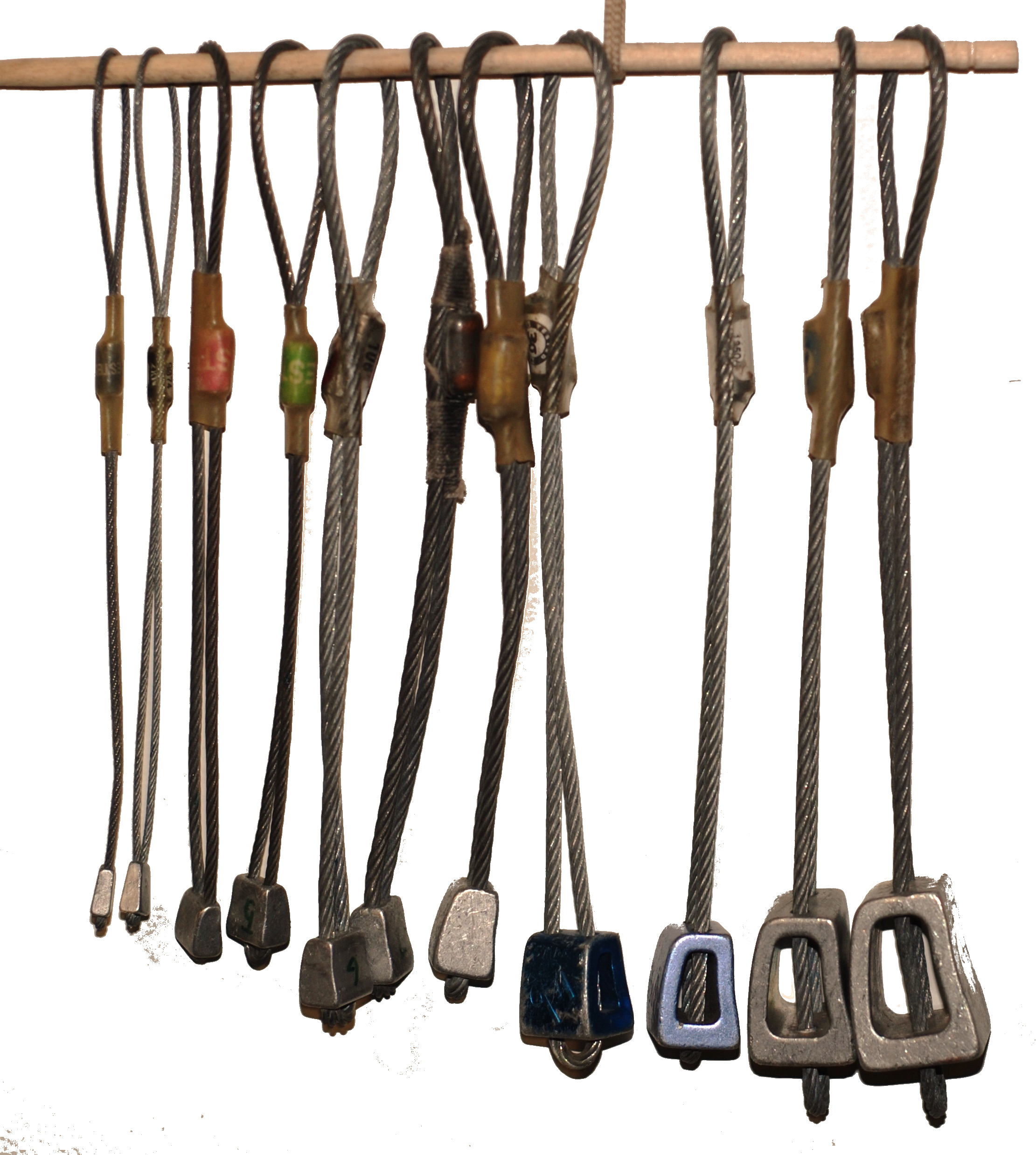
Black Diamond stopper nuts from 1990s

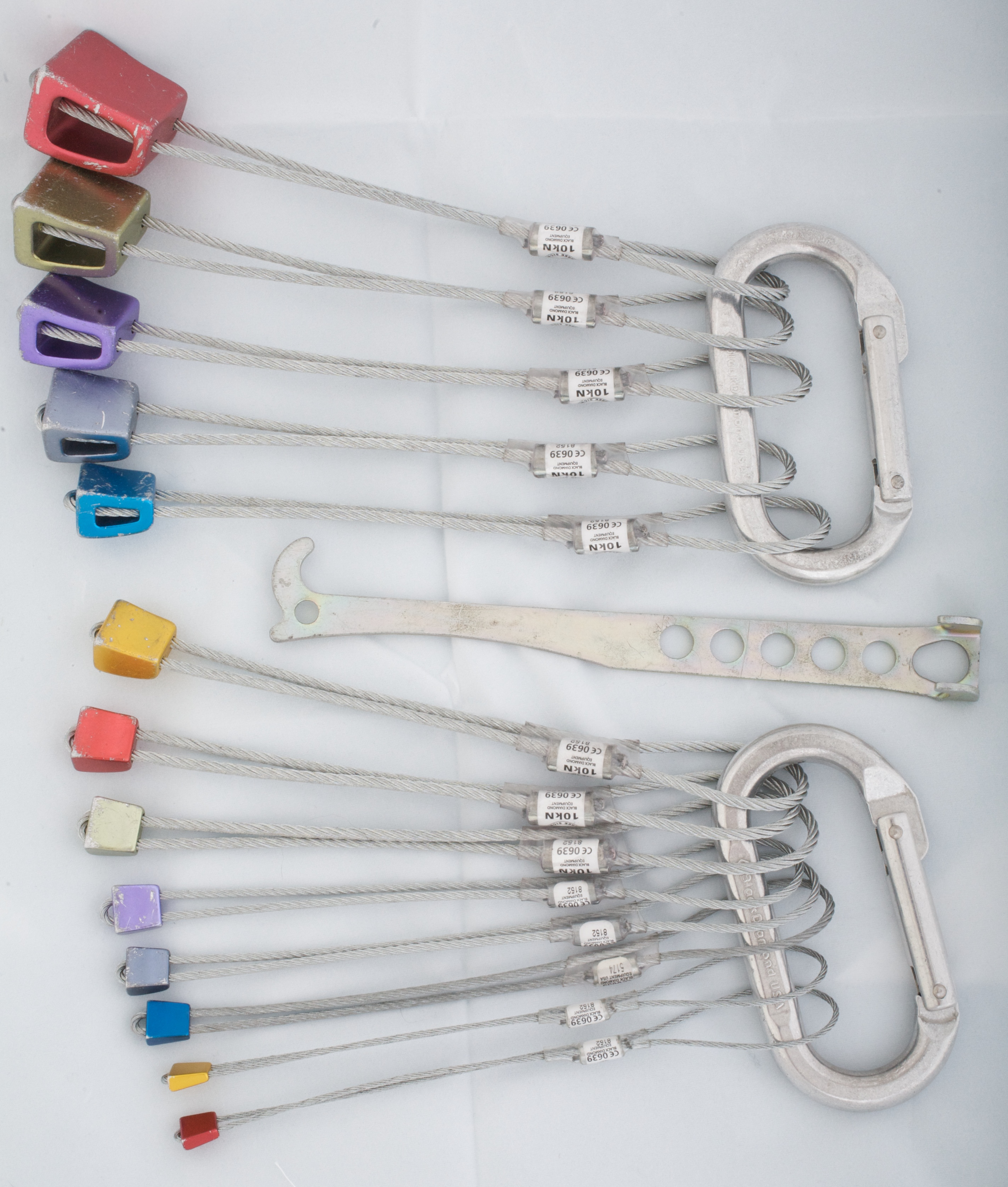
Black Diamond stopper nuts from 2010s

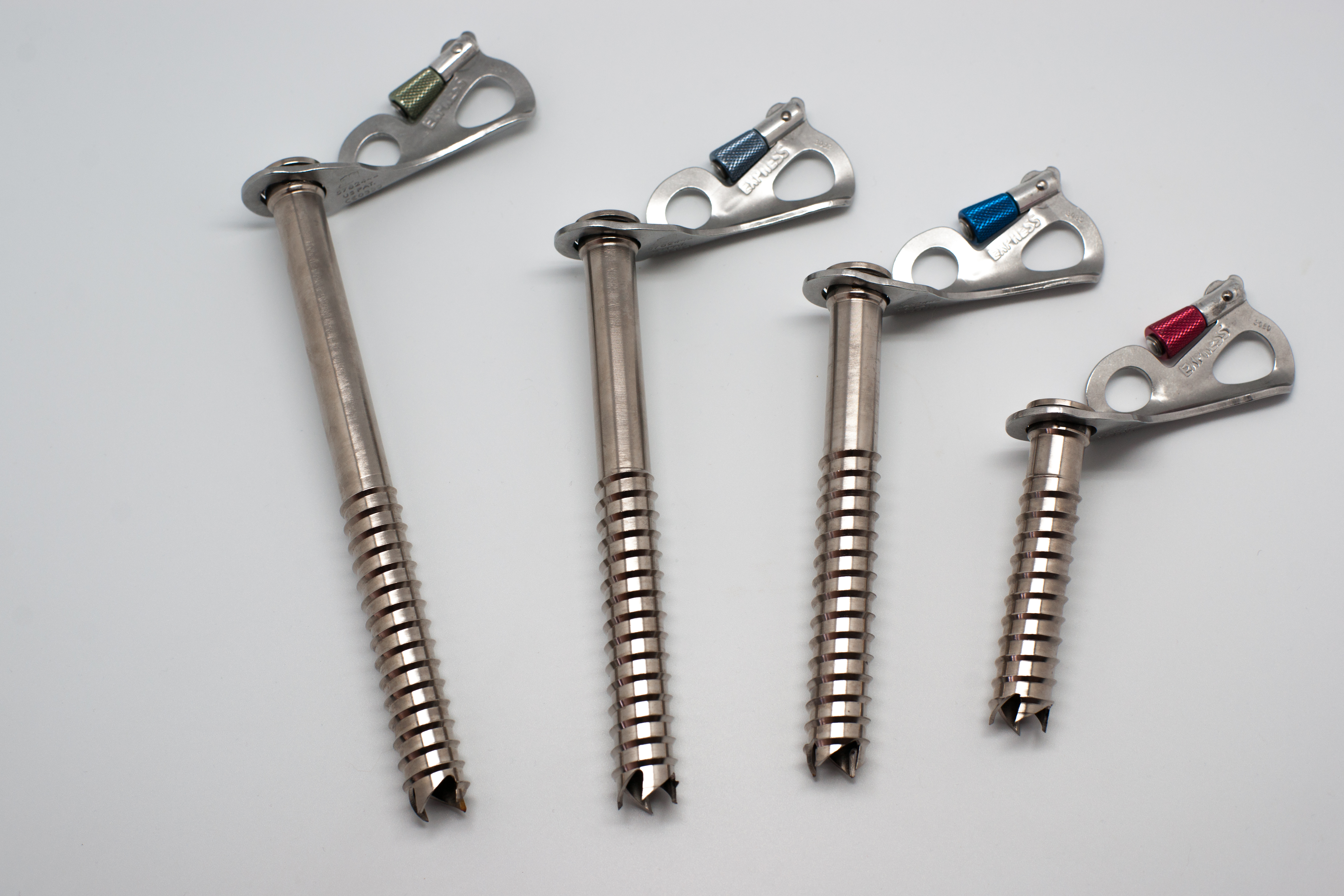
Black Diamond Express Ice Screws

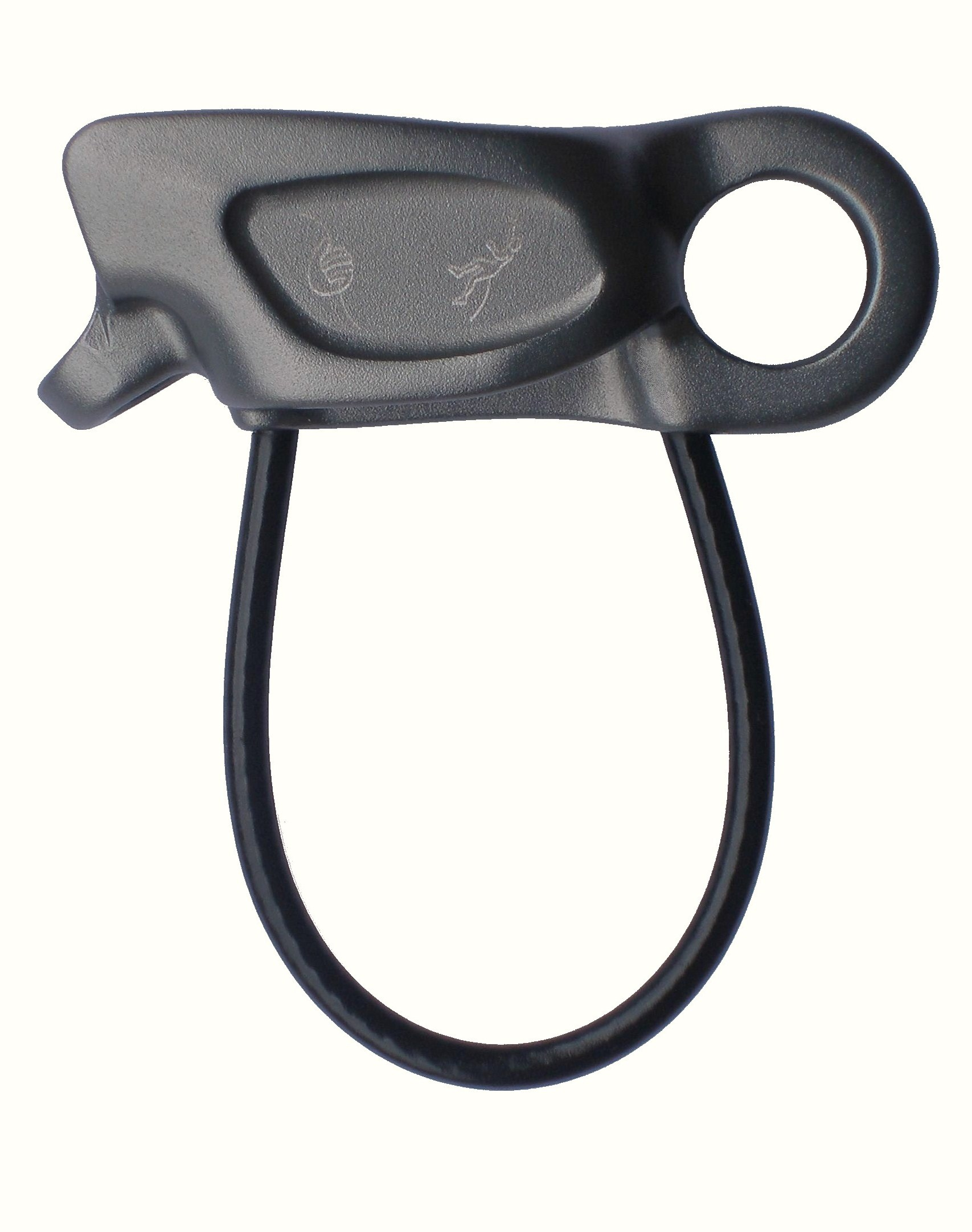
ATC Guide belay device

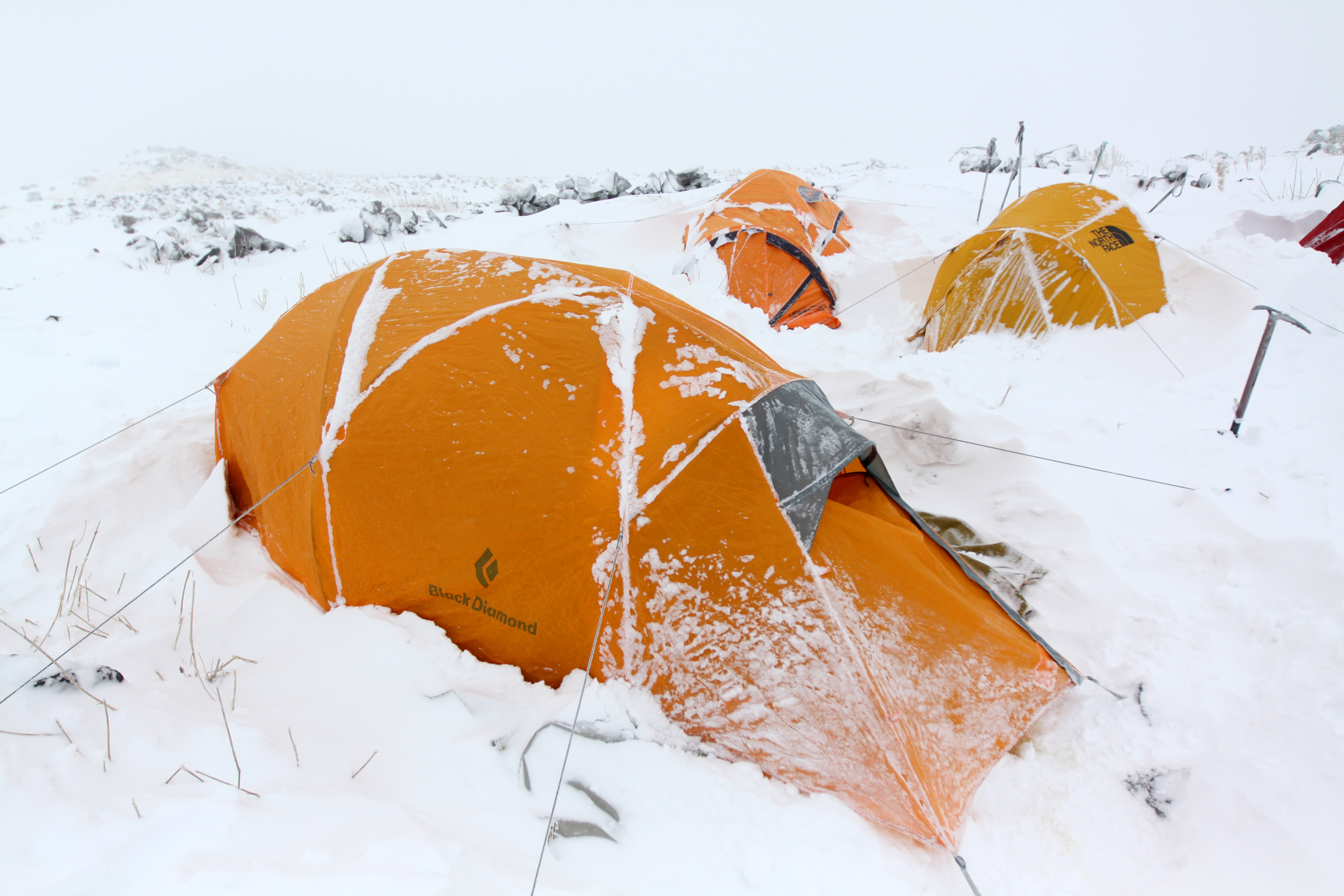
Black Diamond Tent, Stormtrack

As is common in safety-equipment industries, Black Diamond have issued many product recalls following safety concerns.

== Social justice and environmentalism ==
When the Instagram page of Black Diamond posted a black page in solidarity with anti–police violence protesters on June 5, 2020, in which Black Diamond pledged $250,000 to support access to the outdoors by athletes of color, the company acknowledged it was aware of "widespread concerns" about its "association" with Clarus Corporation chief executive Warren Kanders, who also leads Safariland, the company which manufactured the tear gas widely used against protesters. Activists have called for a boycott of Black Diamond over these ties, which has been embraced by various climbing-related organizations. Safariland announced the divestiture of its crowd control products divisions, including tear gas, on June 9, 2020. The Clarus Corporation also faced criticism for a lack of diversity from pension fund giant CalPERS, who recommended in June 2020 that Clarus shareholders vote against re-electing executive chairman and largest shareholder Warren Kanders and two other board members. On June 9, 2020, Warren Kanders and other board members were re-elected to the board of directors.

Black Diamond's parent the Clarus Corporation also owned ammunition company Sierra Bullets until its sale in 2024. In 2018, the company monitored discussions regarding the role of guns in the outdoor industry for boycotts.

Former Black Diamond CEO Peter Metcalf had a history of political advocacy for both the outdoor industry and the public lands of Utah, and united with other outdoor companies against policies that threaten public lands and outdoor recreation.

Black Diamond says that they recycle as much waste as possible, make substantial use of wind and solar power, and support environmental non-profit bodies.

== See also ==
- List of outdoor industry parent companies
