= Yvon Chouinard =

American climber and entrepreneur (born 1938)

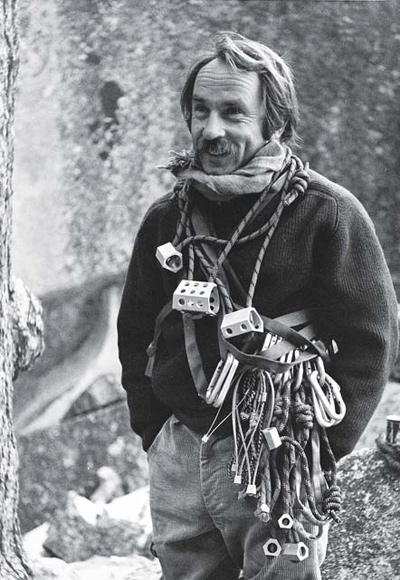
- Chouinard in 1972, photo by Tom Frost
- Born: November 9, 1938 (age 88); Lewiston, Maine, U.S.
- Occupations: Rock climber, equipment manufacturer
- Known for: Founder of Chouinard Equipment Ltd. and Patagonia
- Spouse: Malinda Pennoyer (m. 1971)
- Children: 2

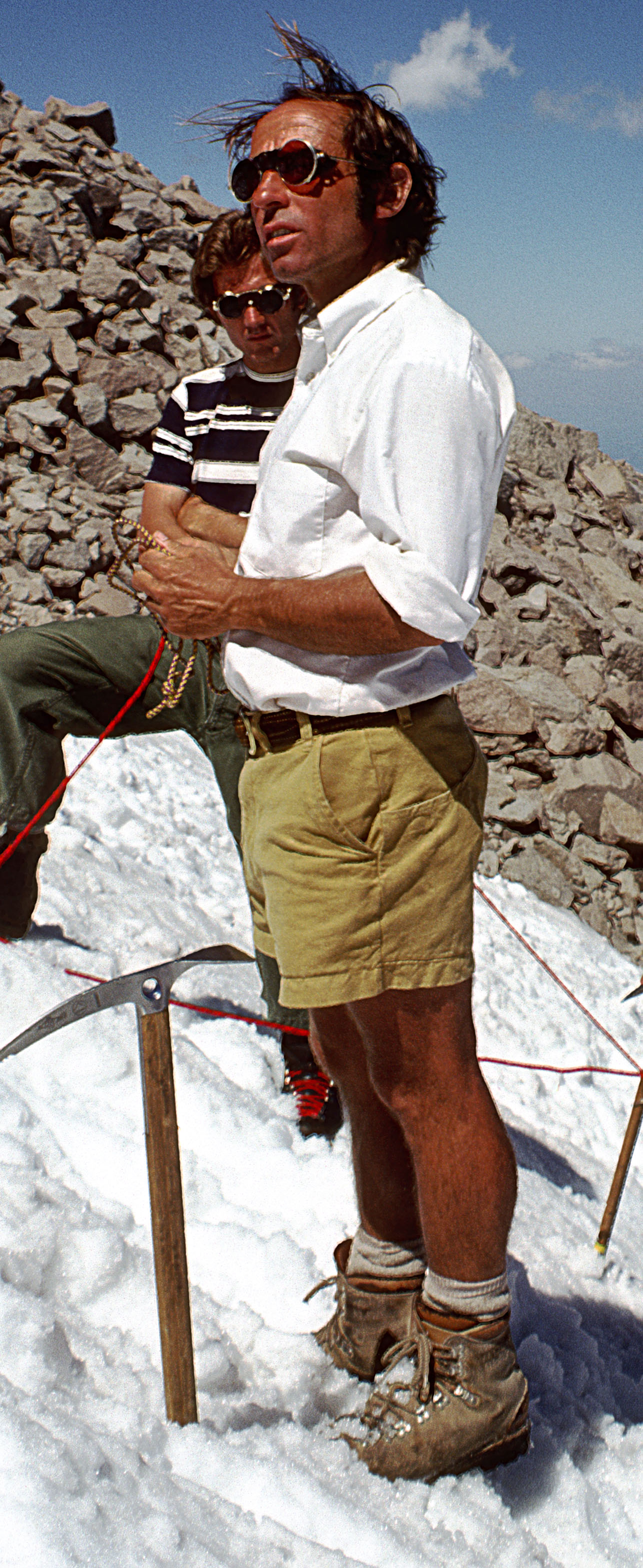
Chouinard in 1975

Yvon Chouinard (born November 9, 1938) is an American rock climber, environmentalist, and businessman. His company, Patagonia, sells outdoor products, outerwear, and food. He was named one of the 100 most influential people in the world by Time magazine in 2023.

== Early life ==
Chouinard's father was a French Canadian handyman, mechanic, and plumber. In 1947, Yvon and his family moved from Lewiston, Maine, to Southern California. They were Catholic.

His early climbing partners included Royal Robbins and Tom Frost. A Sierra Club member, in his youth he founded the Southern California Falconry Club, and it was his investigations of falcon aeries that led him to rock climbing. To save money and to make adaptations for the way he was climbing, he decided to make his own climbing tools by teaching himself blacksmithing, and eventually started a business.

== Yosemite rock climber to leading alpinist ==
Chouinard was one of the leading climbers of the "Golden Age of Yosemite Climbing." He was one of the protagonists of the film made about this era: Valley Uprising (2014). He participated in the first ascent of the North America Wall in 1964 (with Royal Robbins, Tom Frost, and Chuck Pratt), using no fixed ropes. The next year, his and TM Herbert's ascent of the Muir Wall on El Capitan improved the style of previous first ascents. Chouinard became the most articulate advocate of the importance of style, the basis of modern rock climbing.

In 1961, he visited Western Canada with Fred Beckey, and made several important first ascents, including the North Face of Mount Edith Cavell (Rockies), the Beckey-Chouinard Route on South Howser Tower in the Bugaboos (Purcell Mountains), and the North Face of Mount Sir Donald (Selkirk Mountains). These climbs opened his eyes to the idea of applying Yosemite big-wall climbing techniques to mountain climbing, and his advocacy was important to modern, high-grade alpinism. Also in 1961, he visited Shawangunk Ridge for the first time, freeclimbing the first pitch of Matinee (the hardest free climb done at Shawangunk Ridge at the time); and introducing chrome-molybdenum steel pitons to the area, which revolutionized climbing protection. In 1968, he climbed Cerro Fitzroy in Patagonia by a new route (The Californian Route, 3rd overall ascent of the mountain) with Dick Dorworth, Chris Jones, Lito Tejada-Flores, and Douglas Tompkins.

Chouinard has also traveled and climbed in the European Alps and in Pakistan.

== Chouinard Equipment, Ltd. ==
In 1957, he bought a second-hand coal-fired forge, and started making hardened steel pitons for use in Yosemite Valley. Between time spent surfing and climbing, he sold pitons out of the back of his car to support himself. The improved pitons were a big factor in the birth of big-wall climbing from 1957 to 1960 in Yosemite. The success of his pitons caused him to found Chouinard Equipment, Ltd.

In the late 1960s, Chouinard and business partner Tom Frost began studying ice climbing equipment, and re-invented the basic tools (crampons and ice axes) to perform on steeper ice. These new tools and his book Climbing Ice (1978) started the modern sport of ice climbing.

Around 1970, he became aware that the use of steel pitons made by his company was causing significant damage to the cracks of Yosemite. These pitons composed 70 percent of his income. In 1971 and 1972, Chouinard and Frost introduced new aluminum chockstones, called Hexentrics and Stoppers, along with the less successful steel Crack-n-Ups, and committed the company to the advocacy of the new tools and a new style of climbing called "clean climbing." This concept revolutionized rock climbing and led to further success of the company, despite cannibalizing the sales of pitons, formerly his most important product.

They applied for a U.S. patent on Hexentrics in 1974, and it was granted on April 6, 1976. These are still manufactured by Black Diamond Equipment.

In the latter 1960s, Chouinard attempted a number of significant technological and technique changes to ice climbing after trips to the Alps in Europe and Sierra Nevada ice gullies in autumn. He removed the flex from crampons, making them more rigid for front-pointing. He drew the taper of a rock hammer into a point for better ice purchase. He increased the cross section of ice screws while also using lighter materials. He experimented with pick and blade issues with ice axes. Prior to this, much of ice climbing was seen as mere step cutting. He attempted to replace hand ice picks (climbing type) with a small ice axe head called a Climaxe.

In 1989, Chouinard Equipment, Ltd. filed for bankruptcy protection in order to protect it from liability lawsuits. The hard assets of Chouinard Equipment, Ltd. were acquired by its employees through the Chapter 11 process, and the company was reestablished as Black Diamond Equipment, Ltd.

== Patagonia and environmentalism ==
Chouinard is most known for founding the clothing and gear company Patagonia. Chouinard started to sell clothes by chance as a way to support his moderately profitable equipment business. In 1970 on a trip to Scotland, he purchased some rugby shirts and sold them with great success. From this small start, the Patagonia company developed a wide selection of rugged technical clothing. According to Chouinard, the intent of Patagonia is to make clothes for people under the rugged, southern Andes/Cape Horn conditions of places like Patagonia.

Recognizing that the financial success of the company provided the opportunity to also achieve personal goals, Chouinard committed the company to being an outstanding place to work, and to be an important resource for environmental activism. In 1984, Patagonia opened an on-site cafeteria offering "healthy, mostly vegetarian food," and started providing on-site child care. In 1986, Chouinard committed the company to "tithing" for environmental activism, committing one percent of sales or ten percent of profits, whichever is the greater. The commitment included paying employees working on local environmental projects so they could commit their efforts full-time.

In the early 1990s, an environmental audit of Patagonia revealed the surprising result (at the time), that corporate cotton, although it was a natural material, had a heavy environmental footprint. In 1996, Chouinard committed the company to using all organic cotton.

In 2002, Yvon Chouinard founded 1% for the Planet and Patagonia became the first business to commit 1% of annual sales to the environment.

In 2014, Patagonia supported the advocacy documentary film DamNation, which is about changing attitudes in America towards its dams. Chouinard was the executive producer of the film, and he was also featured in the film commenting about dams.

In 2018, in acknowledgment that sustainability and responsible practices are core to Patagonia, Yvon Chouinard was recognized with the Sierra Club's top award, the John Muir Award.

In 2022, Chouinard announced that he was donating ownership in Patagonia to a trust to ensure profits are used for addressing climate change. Chouinard's family retains control of the company's voting stock through the Patagonia Purpose Trust.

== Personal life ==
In 1971, Chouinard met and married his wife, Malinda Pennoyer, who was an art and home economics student at California State University, Fresno. They have a son (Fletcher) and a daughter (Claire), both of whom work for Patagonia.

In 2008, Chouinard received an honorary doctorate from Bowdoin College. In 2021, he received an honorary degree from Bates College.

== Bibliography ==
- Chouinard, Yvon (1982). Climbing Ice. New York: Random House. ISBN 0-87156-207-3.
- Chouinard, Yvon (2005). Let My People Go Surfing. New York: The Penguin Press. ISBN 1-59420-072-6.
- Chouinard, Yvon; Vincent Stanley (2012). The Responsible Company: What We've Learned from Patagonia's First 40 years. Patagonia Books. ISBN 978-0-9801227-8-7.
- Chouinard, Yvon; Mathews, Craig; Mazzo, Mauro (2014). Simple Fly Fishing: Techniques for Tenkara and Rod & Reel. Patagonia Books. ISBN 978-1938340369.
- Chouinard, Yvon; Mathews, Craig; Mazzo, Mauro (2025). Pheasant Tail Simplicity: Recipes and Techniques for Successful Fly Fishing. Patagonia Books. ISBN 978-1-952338-28-1.

== Notable ascents ==
- 1961 North Face, Mount Edith Cavell, Canadian Rockies (First ascent with Fred Beckey and Dan Doody).
- 1962 Northeast Face, Disappointment Peak, Teton Range, Wyoming. (IV 5.9 A3) First ascent with Tom Frost.
- 1964 North American Wall, El Capitan, Yosemite Valley – (VI 5.8 A5 3000') – First ascent with Royal Robbins, Tom Frost and Chuck Pratt.
- 1965 Muir Wall, El Capitan, Yosemite Valley – (VI 5.10 A3) – First ascent with TM Herbert, June 1965.
- 1968 Southwest Ridge aka California Route, Cerro Fitzroy, Patagonia First ascent of route with Doug Tompkins, Lito Tejada-Flores, Chris Jones and Dick Dorworth, 3rd ascent of peak.
- 1975 Diamond Couloir (direct finish) Mount Kenya, Kenya. First ascent of direct finish with Michael Covington, January 1975.
