= Spring-loaded camming device =

Piece of rock climbing or mountaineering protection equipment

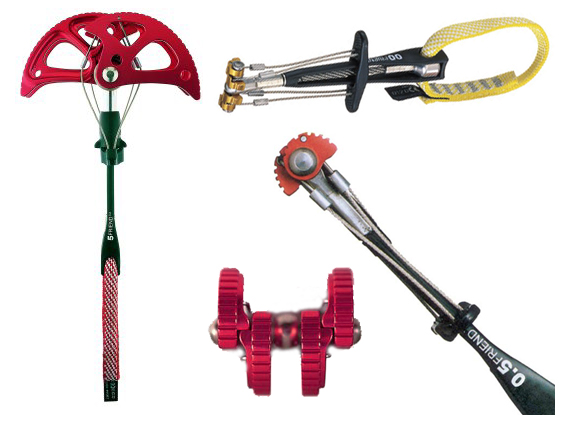
A selection of spring-loaded camming devices of differing sizes

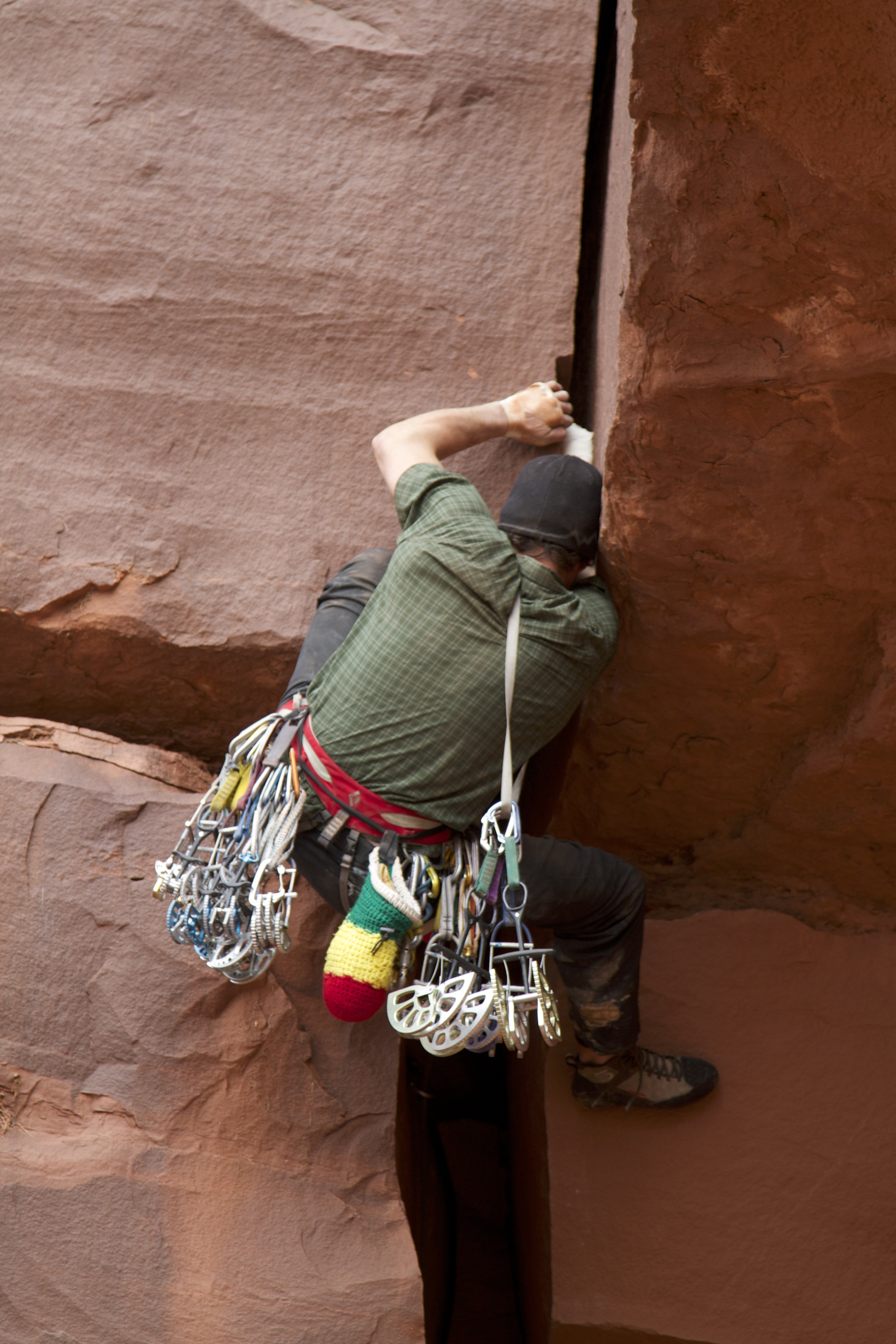
Climbers often carry a large number of cams on traditional climbs.

A spring-loaded camming device (also SLCD, cam or friend) is a piece of rock climbing or mountaineering protection equipment. It consists of two, three, or four cams mounted on a common axle or two adjacent axles, so that pulling on the axle forces the cams to spread further apart. It is then attached to a sling and carabiner at the end of the stem. The SLCD is used by pulling on the "trigger" (a small handle) so that the cams retract together, then inserting it into a crack or pocket in the rock and releasing the trigger to allow the cams to expand. A pull on the rope, such as that generated by a climber falling, will cause a properly placed SLCD to convert the pulling force along the stem of the unit into outward pressure on the rock, producing massive amounts of friction and preventing the removal of the unit from the rock. Due to the large forces exerted on the rock when an SLCD is fallen on, it is very important that SLCDs are only placed in solid, strong rock.

== History ==
Vitaly Abalakov's invention of the Abalakov Cam was the first application to climbing of the principle of a cam to climbing equipment. His cams were sections cut out of a pulley wheel and bore a remarkable resemblance to today's tricams. Since these shapes were eccentric, the intercept angle of the cam changed as the cam rotates and expands.

In 1973, Greg Lowe filed for a patent for a cam that had a "constant intercept" angle. Using a logarithmic spiral shape resulted in a uniform angle between the rock and each lobe of the cam; this constant angle is designed to always provide the necessary friction to hold a cam in equilibrium. Designed so that a load produces a rotational force, the logarithmic cam shape allowed for a single device to fit securely in a range of crack sizes.

Modern SLCDs were invented by Ray Jardine in 1978 (US patent 4,184,657) and sold under the brand name of "Friends". Ray designed a spring-loaded opposing multiple cam unit with a more stable 13.75 degree camming angle and an innovative triggering mechanism. (The term friend is widely used by climbers to refer to SLCDs in general, but properly speaking it refers to the brand popularized by Mark Vallance and manufactured by Wild Country). Other popular brands include Black Diamond Camalots, Metolius Power Cams, DMM 4CUs, Trango FlexCams, and CCH Aliens.

== Modern use ==
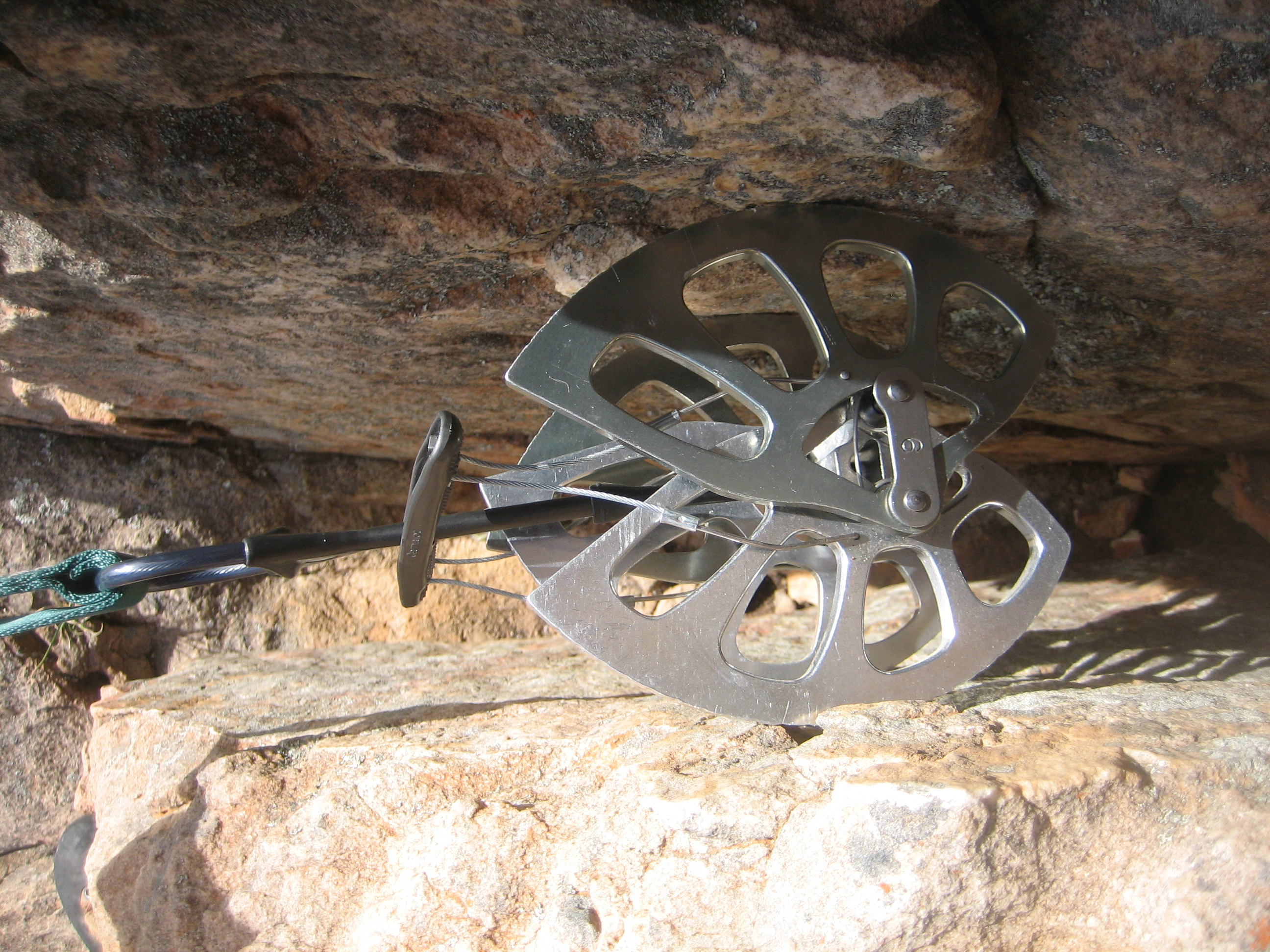
Use of a cam in a large crack

The invention of SLCDs revolutionized rock climbing because it meant that parallel and flaring cracks could be easily protected. Furthermore, unlike pitons, SLCDs can be removed easily without causing damage to the rock, which made clean climbing (climbing without damaging the rock) practical on many more climbs. Since the invention of the Technical Friend (that replaces the original one-piece machined alloy shaft with a brazed assembly incorporating a length of thick stainless-steel cable, which is better able to cope with loading over an edge), there has been a great deal of development of the SLCD by a variety of manufacturers. For example, the adoption of the dual axle design by Black Diamond, the invention of three-lobed camming units to fit smaller cracks, and the more recent invention of the Link Cam by Omega Pacific, a design that allows one SLCD to span an even larger range of crack sizes. SLCDs are sold in various sizes to fit a diverse range of cracks from about 6–300 millimetres (0.2–10 in) wide, though devices of below about 10 millimetres (0.4 in) or above about 100 millimetres (4 in) are not often seen. To fit non-parallel cracks, there are SLCDs with asymmetrical "offset" cams and devices that expand the lobes independently (Totem Cam).

Traditional climbers frequently climb with numerous and variously sized SLCDs to cover a wide range of crack sizes, often having multiples of the same size, depending on the protection requirements of the climb. Some popular climbing areas like Indian Creek, UT have extremely consistent feature sizes that require climbers to carry double-digit numbers of the same size SLCDs to properly protect a route.
