= Liz Robbins =

American rock climber and designer

Elizabeth Burkner Robbins
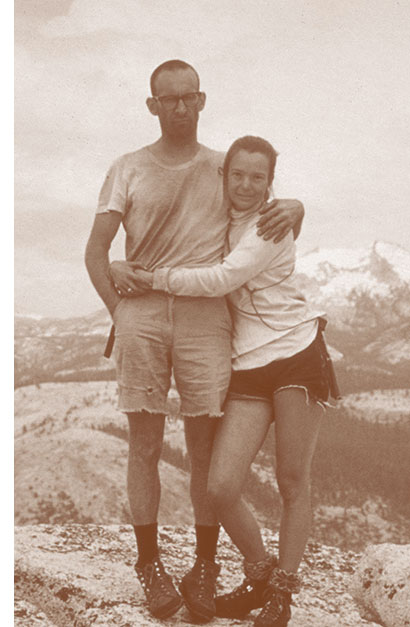
- Liz and Royal Robbins after climbing Half Dome
- Born: Elizabeth Burkner; Modesto, California, U.S.
- Education: University of California, Berkeley
- Occupations: Rock climber, designer
- Known for: First woman to climb a Grade VI route; co-founder of Royal Robbins Inc.
- Spouse: Royal Robbins (m. 1963)

Elizabeth Burkner Robbins is an American rock climber, outdoor equipment designer and co-founder of Royal Robbins Inc. In 1967, she became the first woman to climb a Grade VI route when she summitted Half Dome's Northwest Face. She and her husband Royal Robbins developed Royal Robbins Inc., an outdoor equipment manufacturer and clothing company.

== Biography ==
Elizabeth Burkner grew up in Modesto, California. Her father Earl Burkner owned a paint company in Modesto, and she grew up in a middle class household. Elizabeth was an only child.

=== Climbing ===
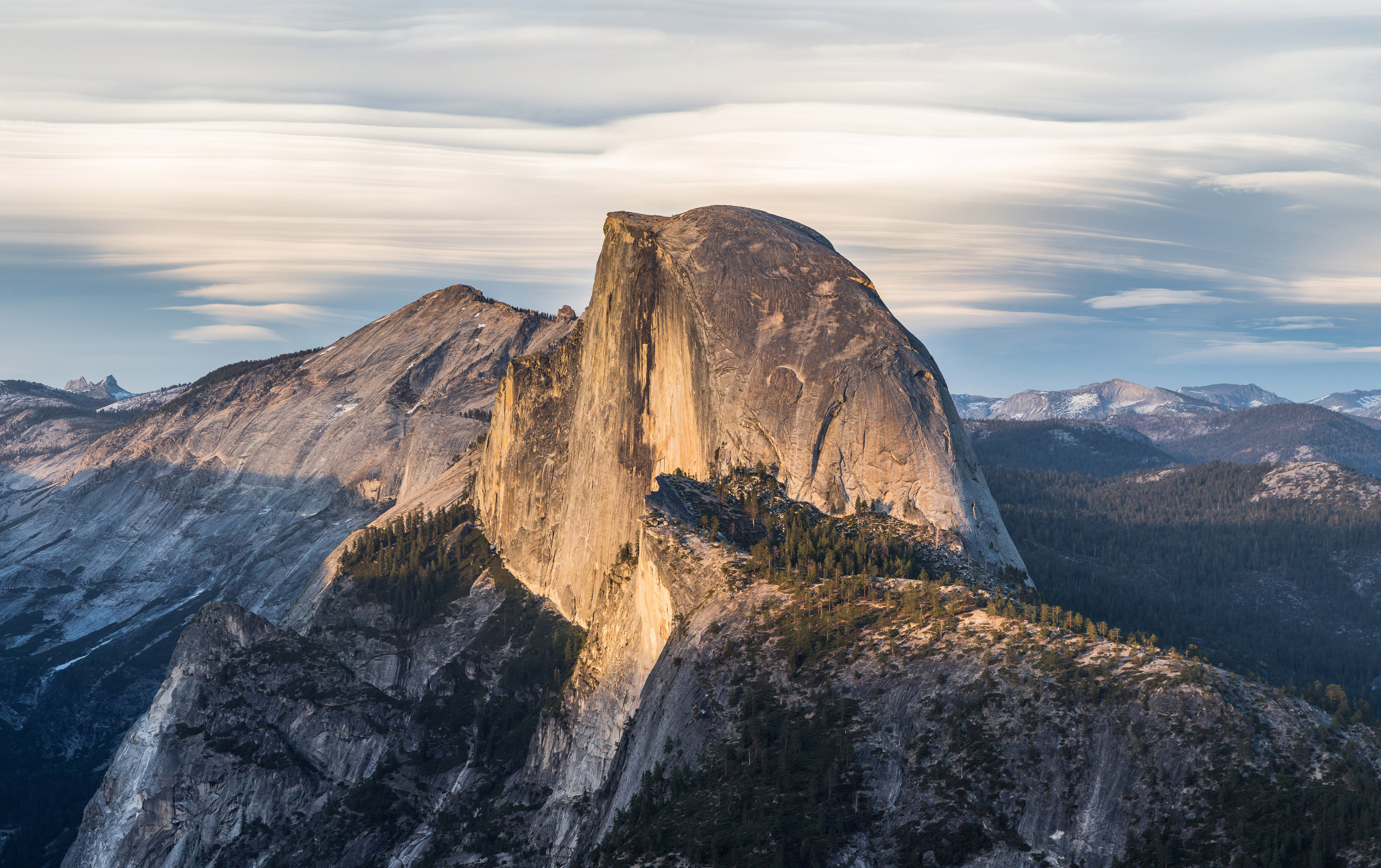
Half Dome at Yosemite, where Liz Robbins would make her historic ascent.

In 1960, Burkner took a break from her studies at University of California, Berkeley to work at the Ahwahnee Hotel in Yosemite. There, she began learning to rock climb and met Royal Robbins, a well-known mountain climber, in Yosemite’s Camp 4. For the next several years, Liz and Royal would make a number of first ascents across the Yosemite Valley.

On November 17, 1963, the couple married in San Francisco. After their honeymoon, Elizabeth and Royal returned to Modesto where Royal learned how to mix paints at Elizabeth's father's paint company. Royal's time at Valley Paints was short lived as he soon yearned to return to climbing. Royal Robbins would later support himself giving climbing lectures and Liz Robbins returned to her father's paint store where she sold paints and coatings in between climbing expeditions.

In 1965, the couple moved to Switzerland where Royal worked at the Leysin American School and set many first ascents across Europe. In 1967, the couple returned to California and started a climbing school. That year, Liz and Royal summitted Half Dome's Northwest Face. In doing so, Liz Robbins became the first woman to successfully complete a Grade VI climbing route. That same year, Liz and Royal made the first ascent of Nutcracker Suite on Ranger Rock. It is well regarded by climbers as being the first climb in the United States to be completed without pegs or expansion bolts, preventing scarring of the rock. The climb made a strong impression on the Robbinses, who would then advocate for "clean climbing" and leaving a limited environmental impact.

=== Business ===
In 1969 Liz and Royal Robbins opened their first outdoor equipment company, Mountain Paraphernalia. The shop opened in the basement of Liz Robbins's father's home in Modesto, California. The company quickly became known among climbers and outdoor enthusiasts for their European imports of climbing boots and English hiking sweaters.

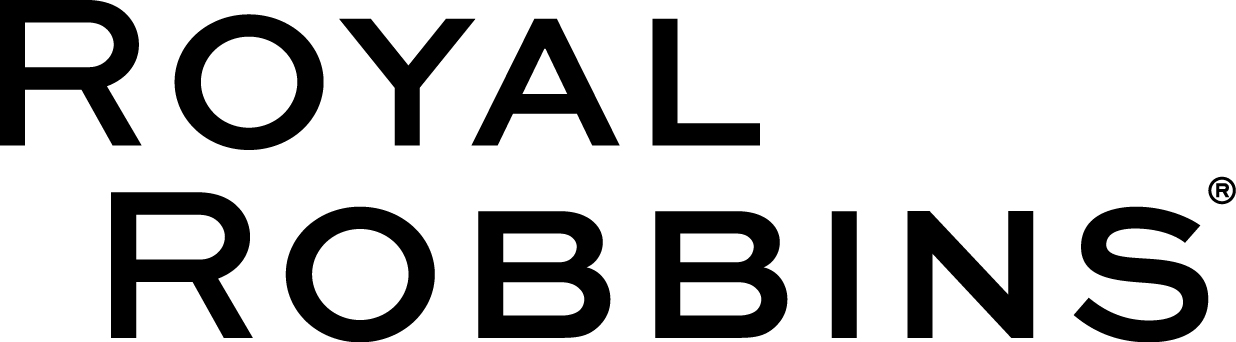
Royal Robbins Inc. logo

While selling climbing and outdoor equipment at Mountain Paraphernalia, Liz Robbins decided to try designing clothing as the types of clothes she was looking for while mountain climbing did not exist. She reached out to a friend, Susie Tompkins Buell for help. Working with Buell's pattern maker, in 1975 Liz Robbins designed her first-ever piece of clothing, the Billy Goat Short. It would go on to become a best seller, and encourage the couple to shift their product line to clothing from outdoor equipment. Liz Robbins became the company's lead designer.

The company would change names several times before settling on Royal Robbins Inc. in 1982. The company would go on to produce a number of well regarded items for climbers and mountaineers, and the Robbins family would raise two children together. Royal and Liz Robbins ran the business until 1999 when they appointed Dan Costa as CEO. In 2001, the couple sold their interest in the company to Costa. In 2015, Liz Robbins returned to Royal Robbins Inc. as a technical advisor.
