= Regular Northwest Face of Half Dome =

Big wall climbing route in Yosemite, US

Regular Northwest Face
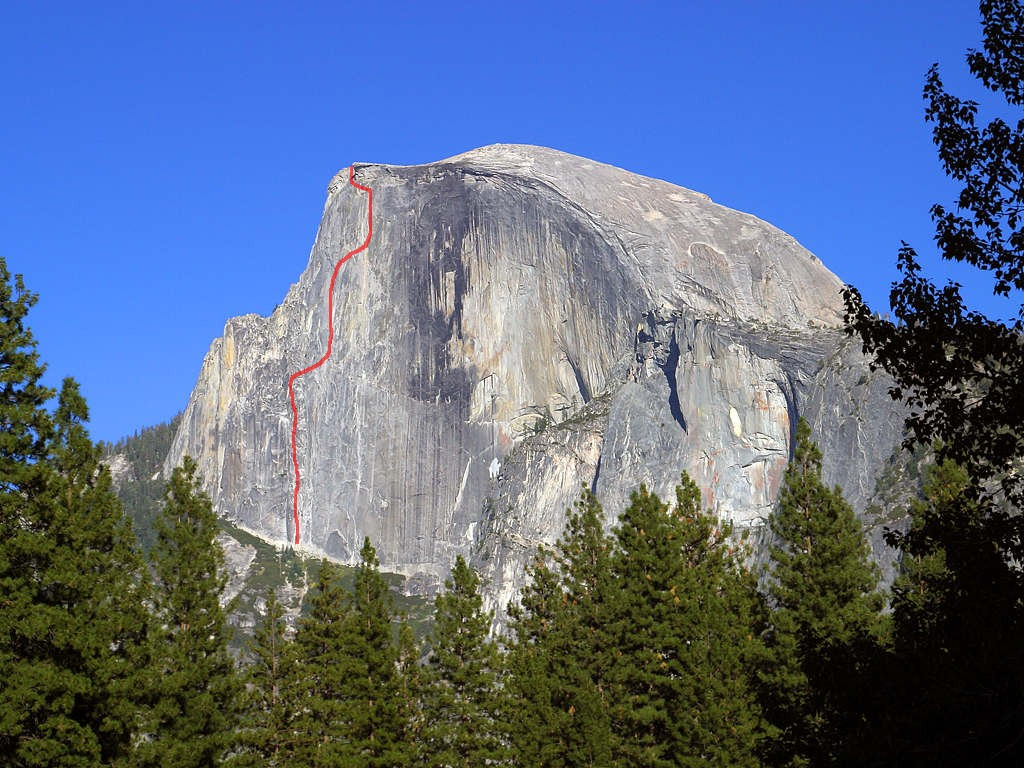
- The Regular Northwest Face of Half Dome approximately follows the red line
- Location: California, USA
- Coordinates: 37°44′44.4″N 119°32′06.5″W
- Climbing area: Yosemite Valley
- Route type: Aid climbing; Big wall climbing
- Vertical gain: 2,000 ft (610 m)'
- Pitches: 23
- Technical grade: 5.12 (7b/+) (full free climb); 5.9 (5c) A1 (use of aid)
- NCCS grade: VI
- First ascent: Royal Robbins, Mike Sherrick, and Jerry Gallwas, 1957
- First free ascent: Art Higbee, Jim Erickson, 1976
- First free solo ascent: Alex Honnold, 2008
- Fastest ascent: 1:22 Alex Honnold, 2012

The Regular Northwest Face of Half Dome was the first Grade VI big wall climbing route in the United States. It was first climbed in 1957 by a team consisting of Royal Robbins, Mike Sherrick, and Jerry Gallwas. Its technical grade is VI 5.9 A1 as an aid climbing route and 5.12 (7b/+) as a fully free climbed route. It is recognized in the historic climbing text Fifty Classic Climbs of North America and considered a classic around the world.

Although the first ascent took five days, most ascents now are accomplished in two. The record for the fastest ascent of the route is 1:22 and was set during a free solo climbing ascent in late May 2012 by Alex Honnold, who had previously recorded the first free solo ascent in 2008. This improved on a longstanding record of 1:53 set in October 1999 by Jim Herson and Hans Florine.

== History ==
All of the major walls and formations in Yosemite Valley had been climbed by the mid 1950s with the exception of the Northwest Face of Half Dome and El Capitan. El Capitan, with its intimidating 3000 foot face, was out of the question for at least a few years, leaving Half Dome, with a much more manageable 2000 foot face, as the logical next goal.

The first attempt to climb it was made in 1954 by Dick Long, Jim Wilson, and George Mandatory. However, they only managed to climb 175 feet before retreating. A more serious attempt to find passage up this cliff was made in 1955 by Jerry Gallwas, Don Wilson, Royal Robbins and Warren Harding. After climbing a mere 500 feet over five days, this party, too, retreated.

Gallwas and Robbins, armed with new chrome-molybdenum pitons made by Gallwas, recruited Mike Sherrick and set off on June 24, 1957, determined this time to finish the route. Over a period of five days, they encountered repeated obstacles and they surmounted all these difficulties. Five days after they had left the ground, they stood at the summit. Warren Harding had hiked up the backside of Half Dome via the hikers' trail for the occasion. He had been planning, along with Mark Powell and Bill "Dolt" Feuerer, to give the route another attempt, but had been beaten to it by the successful team. Nevertheless, Harding offered the triumphant team a warm congratulations.

The route was first climbed free in a 3-day push (with three variations to bypass bolt ladders) in 1976 by Art Higbee and Jim Erickson at 5.12b. Never having climbed the route before, they had made five, ground-up attempts, one per year, starting in 1972. They always had to retreat after only 3 pitches; trying to remove dirt from cracks while leading and searching for a possible free line proved difficult. The 24-pitch free climb they did in 1976, with three pitches of 5.12 and three of 5.11, was probably then the most difficult long free climb in Yosemite. In later years, new variations were discovered by other climbers which allowed a free ascent at only 5.12a.

In 2008, Alex Honnold, after a few rehearsals, made the first free solo ascent, via the 5.12a (7a+) variation, in 2 hours and 50 minutes.

Over the Fourth of July Weekend in 2015, a major rockfall occurred on the Regular Northwest Face, severely altering pitches 10 and 11. In September 2016, Yosemite National Park Climbing Rangers climbed the route to assess its condition. The Regular Northwest Face route tends to avoid areas that are likely to pose further rockfall hazard. However, much of the rock on Half Dome is alpine in nature, and it is often quite loose. There is speculation that much more rock will exfoliate off other routes on Half Dome in the near future.
