= Royal Robbins =

American rock climber (1935–2017)

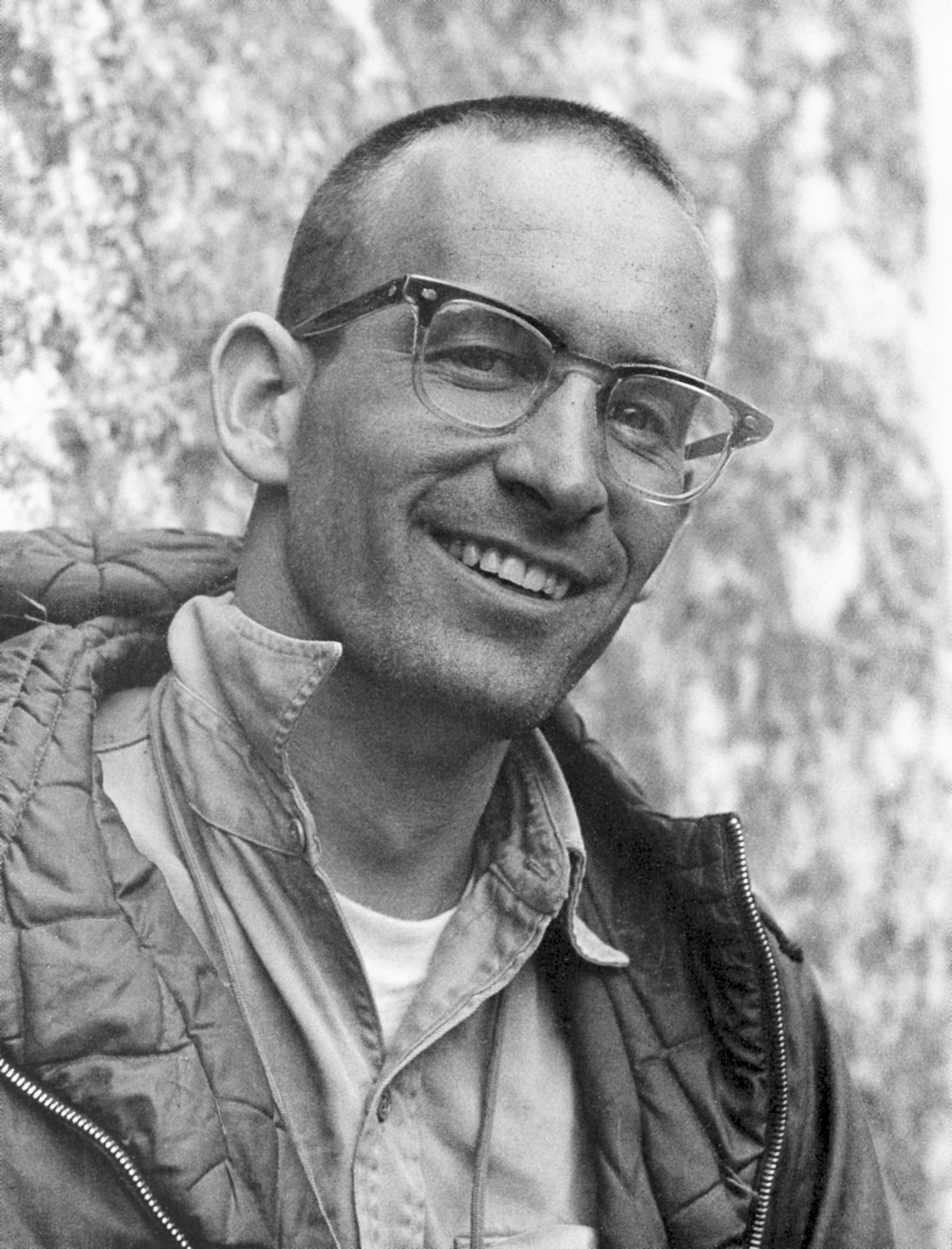
- Royal Robbins in the early 1960s.
- Born: February 3, 1935; Point Pleasant, West Virginia, U.S.
- Died: March 14, 2017 (aged 82); Modesto, California, U.S.
- Occupations: Rock climber, author, CEO
- Known for: Big wall climbing, clean climbing
- Spouse: Liz Robbins 1963-his death

Royal Robbins (February 3, 1935 – March 14, 2017) was one of the pioneers of American rock climbing.

After learning to climb at Tahquitz Rock, Robbins went on to make first ascents of many big wall routes in Yosemite. As an early proponent of clean climbing, he, along with Yvon Chouinard, was instrumental in changing the climbing culture of the late 1960s and early 1970s by encouraging the use and preservation of the natural features of the rock. He was also a well-known kayaker.

== Early life and early climbing career ==
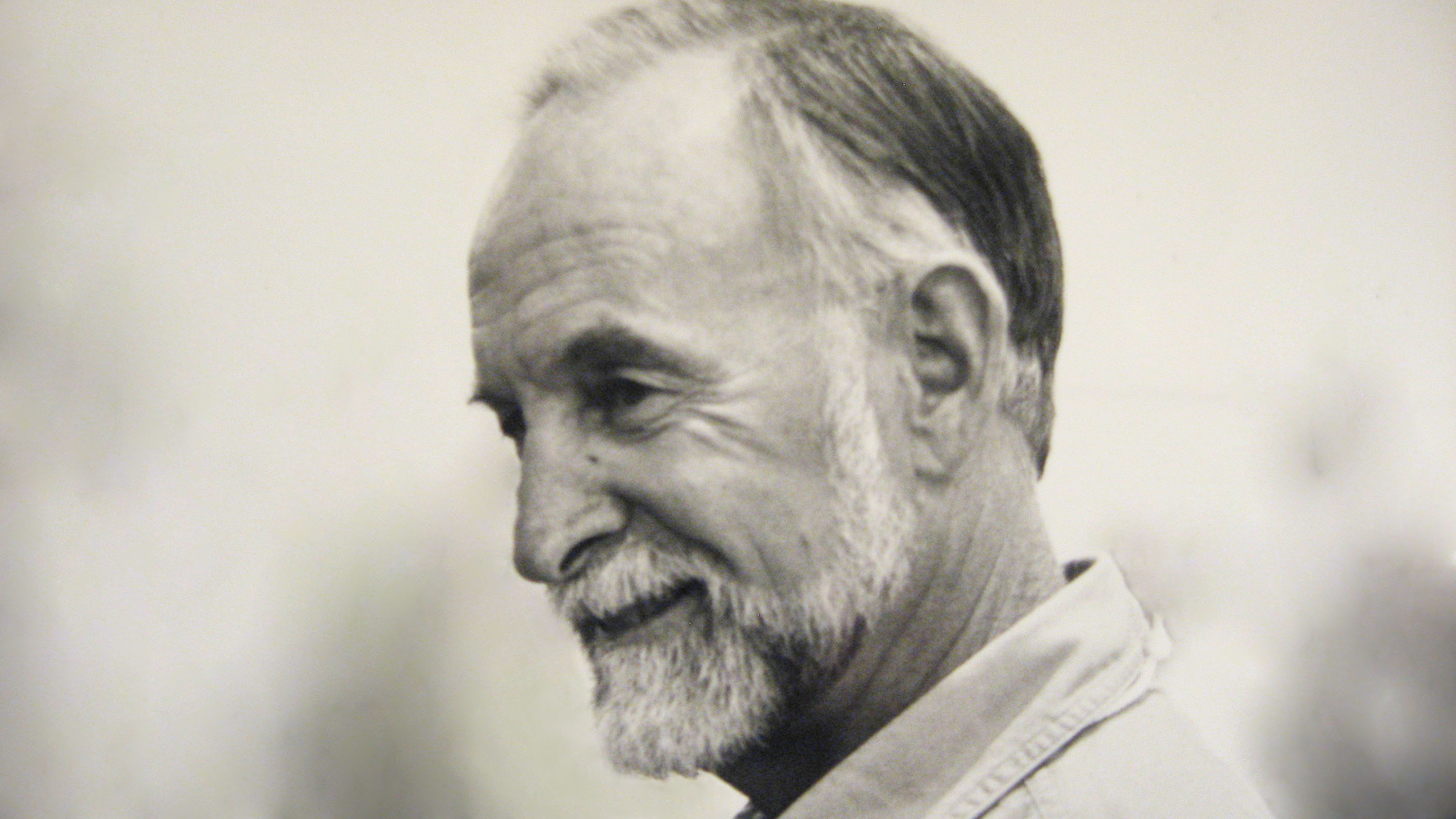
Royal Robbins in the 1990s

Robbins was born in 1935 and grew up in trailer parks in Southern California. Robbins first began to climb in the early 1950s at the nearby Tahquitz Peak. At age 17 in 1952 he climbed the now famous Open Book route up Tahquitz. In 1957, he was among a trio of climbers who ascended the Regular Northwest Face of Half Dome at Yosemite National Park.

== Dawn Wall ==
In 1971, Robbins completed the second ascent, with Don Lauria, of the Dawn Wall on El Capitan, with the (controversial) intention of erasing the route as they climbed it.

Their ascent closely followed the 1970 first ascent by Warren Harding and Dean Caldwell, completed with protective bolts – a method that offended Robbins and other clean climbing advocates. Harding had left all his bolts in the rock; Robbins and Lauria used the bolts to repeat the climb; and Robbins then chopped the heads off the bolts behind them. After two pitches, Robbins stopped chopping the bolts because (according to Lauria) "the quality of the aid climbing was much higher than he had ever expected of Harding or Caldwell and, of course, it was also taking us an awful long time to chop all those goddam bolts."

== Climbing philosophy in Advanced Rockcraft ==
Advanced Rockcraft
- Original Cover
- Author: Royal Robbins
- Language: English
- Subject: Rock climbing
- Publisher: La Siesta Press
- Publication date: 1973
- Publication place: US
- Pages: 96 pages
- ISBN: 0910856567
- Preceded by: Basic Rockcraft

Robbins authored two seminal books, Basic Rockcraft and Advanced Rockcraft, which emphasized free climbing skills and a clean-climbing ethic. In a section of Advanced Rockcraft called Values, he described his climbing philosophy. He believes that "a first ascent is a creation in the same sense as is a painting or a song", and that choosing a climbing line may well be "an act of brilliant creativity". Another creative aspect of a first ascent involves the aids that the leader of the climb rejects. With modern technology of aid climbing available, a first ascent is more artistic if it consciously rejects the use of certain climbing aids that are not essential to the success of the climb. He places emphasis on using equipment which is non-destructive to the mountain environment. He opposes climbs done outside the accepted mores of a given climbing center, or the prevailing style of an area. He favors what he calls "upward variations", or completing a climb using more stringent standards than used on the first ascent. In Robbins's view, the decision to place a single piton is a matter of "enormous importance" because "like a single word in a poem, it can affect the entire composition".

== Kayaking ==
In 1978, Robbins developed psoriatic arthritis, which prevented serious climbing. He took up adventure kayaking instead, completing first descents of challenging rivers from high mountain elevations. His early kayaking partners included Doug Tompkins and Reg Lake. In 1980, the three descended the San Joaquin River Gorge from Devil's Postpile to the Mammoth Pool Reservoir, 5000 feet lower and 32 miles away. In 1981, they carried their kayaks over Mount Whitney Pass at 13,777 foot elevation, into Sequoia National Park and descended 55 miles down the Kern Trench. In 1982, joined by Neusom Holmes, they descended the Middle Fork of the Kings River in Kings Canyon National Park, the largest and steepest of these three High Sierra descents. In 1983, Robbins descended the Tuolumne River in Yosemite National Park from Tuolumne Meadows to Hetch Hetchy Reservoir. He was accompanied by Reg Lake, Chuck Stanley, Lars Holbek, John Armstrong and Richard Montgomery.

He then developed an interest in descending smaller mountain creeks by kayak during their flood stage following heavy rains. His first such project, in May 1984, was the descent of Sespe Creek, which runs through the Los Padres National Forest. He was accompanied by Yvon Chouinard, Reg Lake, John Wasserman and Jackson Frischman. Robbins called this type of trip "flash boating", and later used the technique on the Fresno River, the Chowchilla River and the middle fork of the Mokelumne River.

== Death ==
Robbins died on March 14, 2017, at the age of 82. His daughter said the cause of death was progressive supranuclear palsy.

== Royal Robbins Clothing ==
Following his success as a climber, Robbins founded an eponymous outdoor apparel company with his wife Liz Robbins. Royal Robbins LLC is a San Francisco-based clothing company specializing in outdoor and travel focused attire. Following his death, in 2018 the company was bought by the Swedish company Fenix Outdoor International AG, which also owns brands Fjällräven, Tierra and Hanwag as well as the European outdoor retailers Globetrotter, Naturkompaniet, Friluftsland and Partioaitta. Liz Robbins rejoined the company in December 2015 as a senior advisor.

== Notable ascents ==
- 1952 First free ascent (FFA) of Open Book (Tahquitz), the first route to be rated 5.9 in the Yosemite Decimal System.
- 1957 Northwest Face of Half Dome, Yosemite, CA. First grade VI climb in America. With Mike Sherrick and Jerry Gallwas.
- 1960 The Nose, El Capitan, Yosemite, CA. With Tom Frost, Chuck Pratt, and Joe Fitschen, Second Ascent (first continuous) completed in 7 days
- 1961 Salathé Wall, El Capitan, Yosemite, CA. Hardest big wall grade VI climb in world at time of first ascent. With Tom Frost and Chuck Pratt.
- 1962 American Direct, Aiguille du Dru, Mont Blanc Range, France. With Gary Hemming.
- 1963 Direct NW Face of Half Dome, Yosemite, CA. With Dick McCracken.
- 1963 Robbins Route, Mount Proboscis, Logan Mountains, NWT, Canada. With Jim McCarthy, Layton Kor and Dick McCracken.
- 1964 North America Wall, El Capitan, Yosemite, CA. With Tom Frost, Chuck Pratt and Yvon Chouinard.
- 1964 North Face, Mount Hooker, Wind River Range, Wyoming. With Dick McCracken and Charlie Raymond.
- 1964 Danse Macabre, Devils Tower, Wyoming.
- 1964 Final Exam, Castle Rock, Boulder, CO. With Pat Ament.
- 1964 Athlete's Feat, Castle Rock, Boulder, CO.
- 1965 American Direttissima, Aiguille du Dru, Mont Blanc Range, France. With John Harlin.
- 1965 Dihedral Wall, El Capitan, Yosemite National Park, United States. With Tom Frost. First Continuous Ascent.
- 1967 Nutcracker, Yosemite, CA. An early all-nut protected route, now a Yosemite classic.
- 1967 West Face, El Capitan, Yosemite Valley – First ascent with TM Herbert.
- 1967 North Face, VI 5.9 A3, Mount Geikie, Canadian Rockies, first ascent with John Hudson.
- 1967 North Face, Mount Edith Cavell, Canadian Rockies – First solo ascent.
- 1968 Muir Wall, El Capitan, Yosemite Valley, CA – First Solo Ascent.
- 1969 Mount Jeffers, Cathedral Spires, Kichatna Mountains, Alaska. First ascent of peak with Fitschen and Raymond.
- 1969 The Prow, Washington Column, Yosemite, CA. With Glen Denny.
- 1969 Tis-sa-ack, Half Dome, Yosemite, CA. With Don Peterson.
- 1970 Arcturus, Half Dome, Yosemite, CA. With Dick Dorworth.

== Other climbing achievements ==
- 1960 The Nose, El Capitan, Yosemite, CA. Second ascent.
- 1963 West Face, Leaning Tower, Yosemite, CA. Second ascent and Yosemite's first wall done solo (Grade V).
- 1968 Muir Wall, El Capitan, Yosemite, CA. First Grade VI solo (and therefore the first solo of El Capitan).

== Publications ==
- Robbins, Royal; Sheridan Anderson, illustrator (1971). Basic Rockcraft. Glendale, CA: La Siesta Press. ISBN 978-0910856348.
- Robbins, Royal; Sheridan Anderson, illustrator (1973). Advanced Rockcraft. Glendale, CA: La Siesta Press. ISBN 978-0910856560.
- Robbins, Royal (2009). To Be Brave – My Life, Volume One. Ojai, CA: Pink Moment Press. ISBN 978-0982500019.
- Robbins, Royal (2010). Fail Falling – My Life, Volume Two. Pink Moment Press. p. 188. ISBN 978-0982500026.
- Robbins, Royal (2012). The Golden Years – My Life, Volume Three. Royal Robbins Adventures, distributed by Giraffe Public Relations. p. 158. ISBN 978-0615661926.

== Biographies ==
- Ament, Pat (1992). Royal Robbins: Spirit of the Age. Boulder, CO: Two Lights. ISBN 1881663027.
- Peter Mortimer, Nick Rosen (2014) Valley Uprising

== Gallery ==
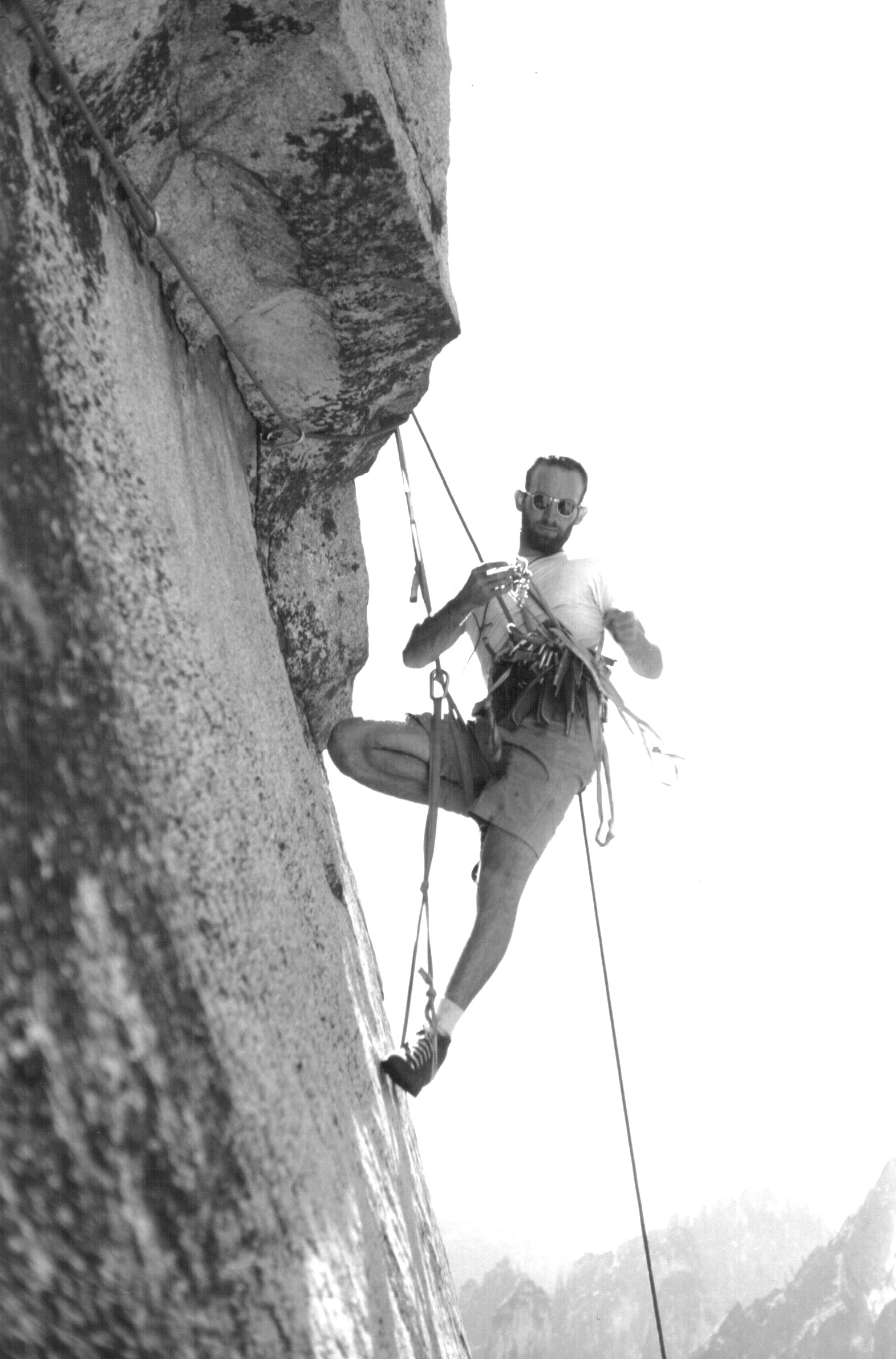
Royal Robbins leading the third pitch of the Salathé Wall on El Capitan in Yosemite Valley.

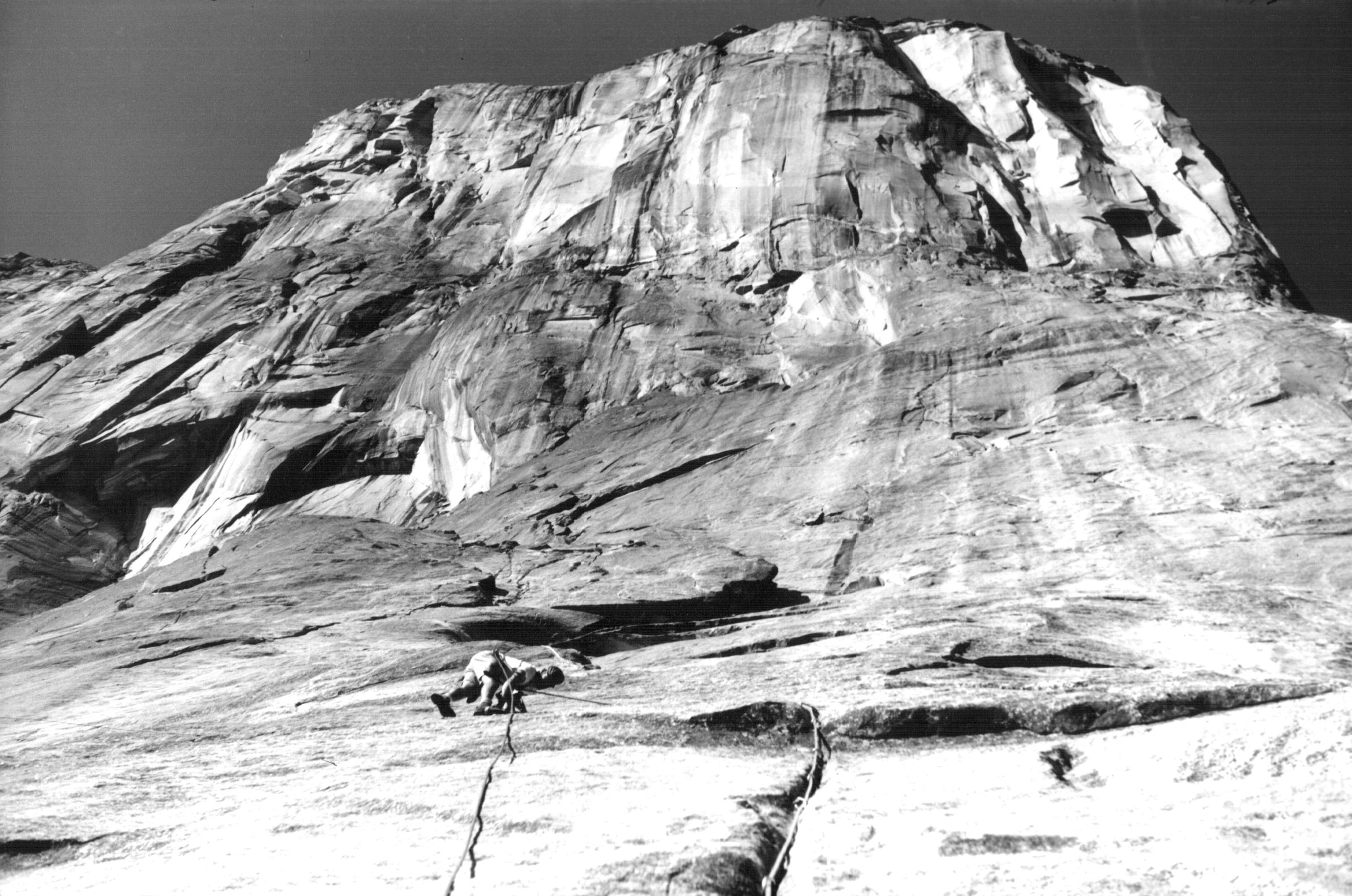
Royal Robbins on first ascent of Salathé Wall, El Capitan.

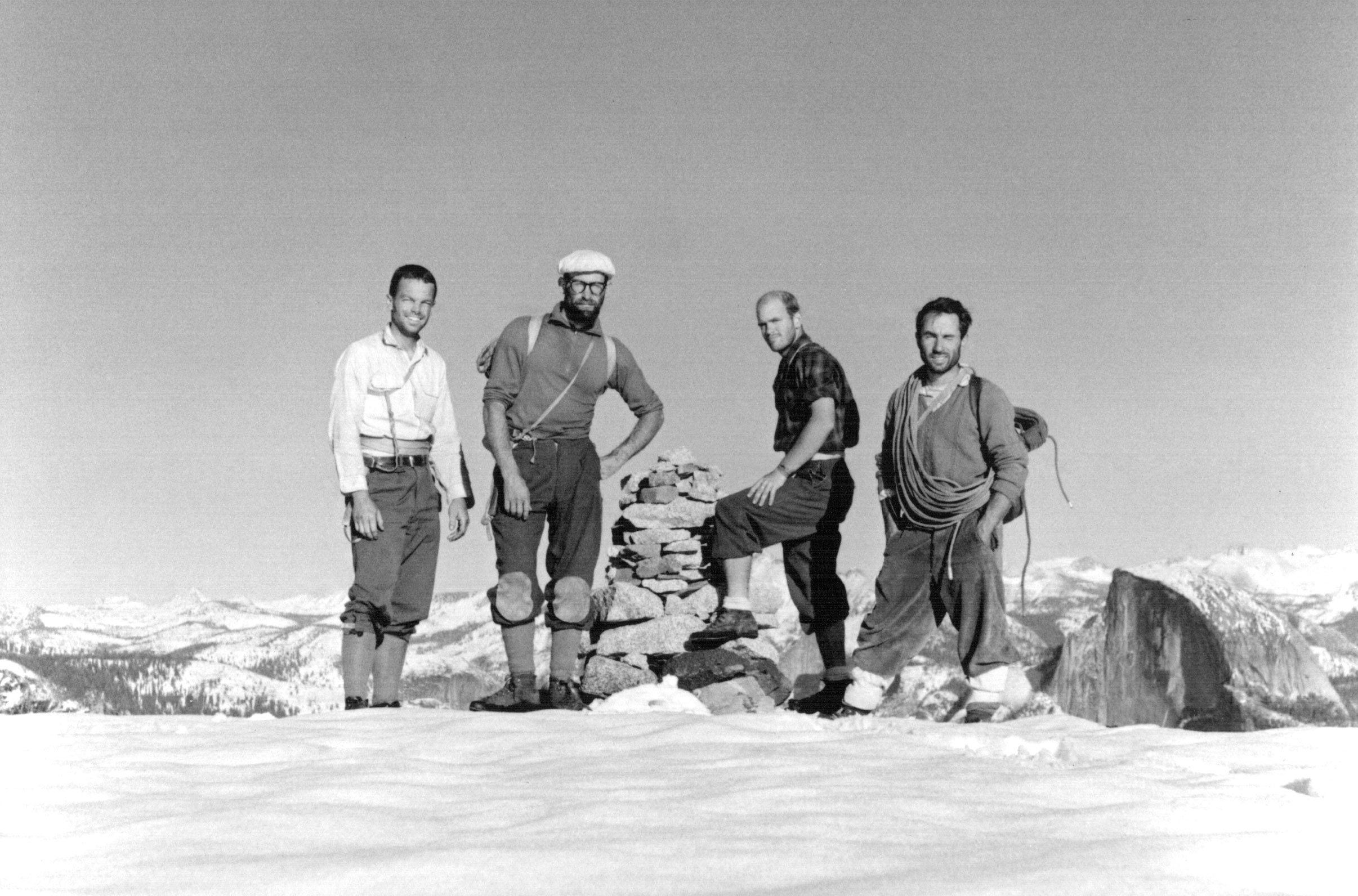
Frost, Robbins, Pratt and Chouinard at the completion of the first ascent of the North America Wall on El Capitan.
