= Therapeutic climbing =

Form of climbing used for mental and physical health interventions

Therapeutic climbing (also known as climbing therapy or bouldering psychotherapy), is a structured form of climbing used for mental and physical health interventions. It integrates psychotherapeutic principles such as goal setting, emotion regulation, and self-efficacy building into climbing sessions.

== Background ==
Therapeutic climbing combines physical exertion, cognitive challenge, and social interaction in a structured environment. It was formalized in Germany as Bouldering Psychotherapy (BPT), a manualized program shown to be comparable in efficacy to group cognitive behavioral therapy (CBT).

== Mental health effects ==
Randomized controlled trials show that structured climbing interventions can significantly reduce depressive and anxiety symptoms. Single-session studies report immediate improvements in mood and reductions in anxiety. Other studies found increases in self-efficacy and self-esteem following multi-week interventions. Qualitative research describes therapeutic climbing as promoting mindfulness, social connection, and intrinsic motivation.

== Public and environmental health perspective ==
Therapeutic climbing aligns with the One Health and public health frameworks by illustrating how interaction with physical and natural environments supports psychological resilience and social well-being. Hospital, community, and outdoor climbing programs demonstrate how built and natural environments can serve as preventive health tools. A 2023 evaluation of a green social prescribing program that included climbing found a social return of approximately £5 for every £1 invested through improved mental health and community cohesion.
