= Climbing =

Activity to ascend a steep object

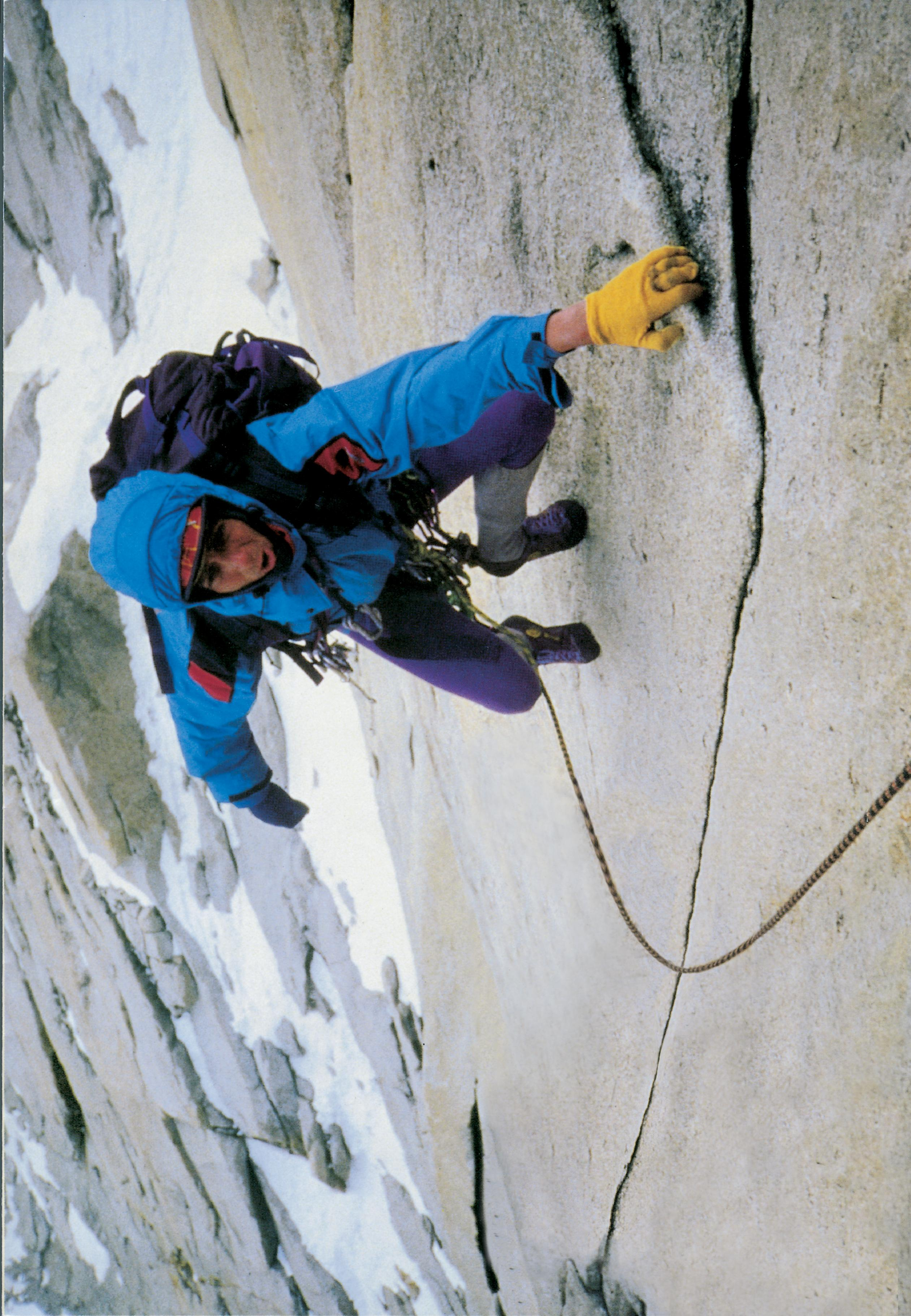
Paul Pritchard on the FFA of the 600-metre (2,000 ft) big wall route, El Caballo de Diablo 5.12a (7a+), on the North Tower of Torres del Paine, in Patagonia

Climbing is the activity of using one's hands, feet, or other parts of the body to ascend steep topographical objects that can range from the world's tallest mountains (e.g. the eight thousanders) to small boulders. Climbing is done for locomotion, sporting recreation, for competition, and in trades that rely on ascension, such as construction and military operations. Climbing is done indoors and outdoors, on natural surfaces (e.g. rock climbing and ice climbing), and on artificial surfaces (e.g. climbing walls and climbing gyms).

== Evolution as a sport ==
The sport of climbing evolved through climbers making first ascents of new types of climbing routes, using new climbing techniques, at ever-increasing grades of difficulty, and with ever-improving pieces of climbing equipment. Guides and guidebooks were an important element in developing the popularity of climbing as a sporting activity in the natural environment. Early pioneers included Walter Bonatti, Riccardo Cassin, Hermann Buhl, and Gaston Rébuffat, who were followed by and Reinhold Messner and Doug Scott, and later by Mick Fowler and Marko Prezelj, and Ueli Steck.

Starting from around the 1980s, the development of the safer format of bolted sport-climbing, the wider availability of artificial indoor climbing walls and climbing gyms, and the development of competition climbing, increased the popularity of rock-climbing as a standalone sport, and led to the emergence of professional rock-climbers, such as Wolfgang Güllich, Alexander Huber, Chris Sharma, Adam Ondra, Lynn Hill, Catherine Destivelle, and Janja Garnbret.

Climbing became an Olympic sport for the first time in the 2021 Olympic Games in Tokyo (see Sport climbing at the 2020 Summer Olympics) in that format that included competition lead climbing, competition bouldering, and competition speed climbing disciplines; competition ice climbing is not yet an Olympic sport.

== Rock-based ==
The sport of rock climbing can trace its origins to the late 19th-century, and has since developed into several major sub-disciplines. Single-pitch and multi-pitch (and big-wall) climbing can be performed in varying styles (including aid, sport, traditional, free solo, and top-roping), while the standalone discipline of bouldering (or boulder climbing) is, by definition, performed in a free-solo format.

- Single pitch climbing refers to routes that are one rope length (up to 50 metres). Multi-pitch climbing (and big wall climbing) refers to routes that are many rope-lengths (even up to 1,000-metres). These two rock climbing sub-disciplines can be conducted in one of several ways:

- Aid climbing is a form of rock climbing that uses artificial aids such as aiders, pitons, and other mechanical devices to assist in ascending a route. Much of rock climbing began as aid climbing, and even by the 1970s, many big wall routes required aid (e.g. The Nose and the Salathé Wall).

- Sport climbing is a form of rock climbing that uses no artificial aids (which is known as free climbing), but does rely on permanent fixed bolts (or pitons), for use as protection while climbing (but not as aid); was started in the 1980s in France and now makes up the world's hardest climbs (e.g. Silence).

- Traditional climbing is a form of rock climbing that uses no artificial aids (and is thus free climbing) but unlike sport climbing, the climbers place removable protection such as SCLDs and nuts while ascending that are removed by the second climber; has many famous routes (e.g. Indian Face, Cobra Crack).

- Free soloing is a form of rock climbing that uses no artificial aids (and is thus also free climbing) and where the climber uses no protection (neither sport nor traditional); thus any fall while free soloing could be fatal; deep-water soloing is a form of free soloing where a fall will result in landing into safe water. The 2017 free solo of Freerider became the Oscar-winning film, Free Solo.

- Top rope climbing is a form of rock climbing that uses no artificial aids but as the sole form of protection, uses a pre-fixed rope secured to the top of the route (i.e. is used on single-pitches), and thus should the climber fall, they simply hang off the rope with no risk of any injury; it is not regarded as free climbing but is a popular and safe way to introduce people to free climbing (and common on climbing walls).

- Bouldering: means ascending boulders or small outcrops with no artificial aids (free climbing) and due to the lower height, with no protection (making bouldering a form of free soloing); very tall boulders where a fall could be serious (i.e. up to 10 metres) are known as highball bouldering. Many milestones in bouldering (e.g. Midnight Lightning, Dreamtime and Burden of Dreams) were created by practitioners of bouldering and free climbing.

== Mountain-based ==
Mountaineering as a form of recreation can trace its origins to an even earlier time than rock climbing, and by the mid 18th century mountaineering in alpine environments had become an established pastime. It has since developed into several major sub-disciplines, including:

- Mountaineering: Ascending mountains, which can involve some rock or ice climbing, but unlike alpine climbing can involve support and fixed ropes.

- Alpine climbing: Ascending large routes that require rock, ice, and mixed climbing skills but with minimal equipment and no outside support.
- Scrambling: Climbing rocky faces and ridges, which can include basic rock climbing, but is considered part of hillwalking.
- Via ferrata: Ascending mountain routes using previously installed fixed steel cables, metal rungs, and ladders for protection and aid.

- Ice climbing: Ascending frozen water ice or hard alpine snow using equipment such as ice axes and crampons; usually in mountain settings.

- Mixed climbing: Ascending routes using ice climbing equipment where there is both rock and ice (called dry-tooling if there is no ice).

- Solo climbing: Ascending routes alone; can involve ropes (roped solo climbing) and artificial aid; where no protection or aid is used, it is free soloing.

== Competition-based ==
Competition climbing (sometimes called "sport climbing") is a regulated sport of competitive rock climbing that originated in the 1980s, and which is done as indoor climbing on artificial climbing walls. The worldwide governing body for competition rock-climbing is World Climbing, which is recognized by the IOC and GAISF, and is a member of the International World Games Association (IWGA). Competition climbing has three parts:

- Competition lead climbing is a form of competitive lead climbing performed on an artificial bolted sport climbing route.
- Competition bouldering is a form of competitive bouldering performed on a selection of artificial bouldering routes.
- Competition speed climbing is a form of competitive speed climbing performed on a standardized artificial wall with a top rope.

Competition ice climbing is a regulated sport of 'competitive ice climbing' that originated in the early 2000s, and which is done on outdoor or indoor climbing on artificial ice climbing walls that consist of ice and dry surfaces. The UIAA is the governing body for competition ice climbing worldwide and its events include a lead ice climbing discipline and a speed ice climbing discipline. Competition ice climbing is not as yet an Olympic sport.

== Other recreational-based ==
- Buildering: Ascending the exterior skeletons of buildings, typically without protective equipment (e.g. as free solo climbing by Alain Robert).
- Canyoneering: Climbing along canyons for sport or recreation.
- Crane climbing: An illicit act of climbing up mechanical cranes, which is a form of buildering.
- Grass climbing: An older form of climbing when climbing steep but grassy mountainsides, often requiring ropes, was undertaken.
- Mallakhamba: A traditional Indian sport that combines climbing a pole or rope with the performance of aerial yoga and gymnastics.
- Parkour: A sport based around smooth movement, including climbing, around urban landscapes.
- Pole climbing: Climbing poles and masts without equipment.
- Rope climbing: Climbing a short, thick rope for speed; not to be confused with roped climbing, as used in rock or ice climbing.
- Stair climbing: ascending elevation via stairs.
- Tree climbing: Recreationally ascending trees using ropes and other protective equipment.

== Commercial-based ==
- Rope access: Industrial climbing, usually abseiling, as an alternative to scaffolding for short works on exposed structures.
- A tower climber is a professional who climbs broadcasting or telecommunication towers or masts for maintenance or repair.

== Climbing and health ==
Therapeutic climbing refers to the structured use of climbing for mental and physical health benefits. It integrates psychotherapeutic principles such as goal setting, emotion regulation, and self-efficacy building into climbing sessions.

== International organizations and governing bodies ==
- World Climbing (WC) serves as the official governing body for competition climbing worldwide. It is recognized by the International Olympic Committee (IOC) and the Global Association of International Sports Federations (GAISF) and oversees and regulates competitive climbing events in the disciplines of lead climbing, bouldering, and speed climbing.
- The International Mountaineering and Climbing Federation (UIAA) is a long-standing body for mountaineering and climbing equipment, and it also oversees competition ice climbing, where it sets standards and guidelines for ice climbing events and promotes the sport's development.

== In film ==
Climbing has been the subject of both narrative and documentary films. Notable climbing films include Touching the Void (2003), Everest (2015), Meru (2015), The Dawn Wall (2015), Free Solo (2018), 14 Peaks: Nothing Is Impossible (2021), and The Alpinist (2021). The Reel Rock Film Tour is a traveling film festival that exclusively screens climbing and adventure films, and includes the Reel Rock climbing film series.

== Gallery ==
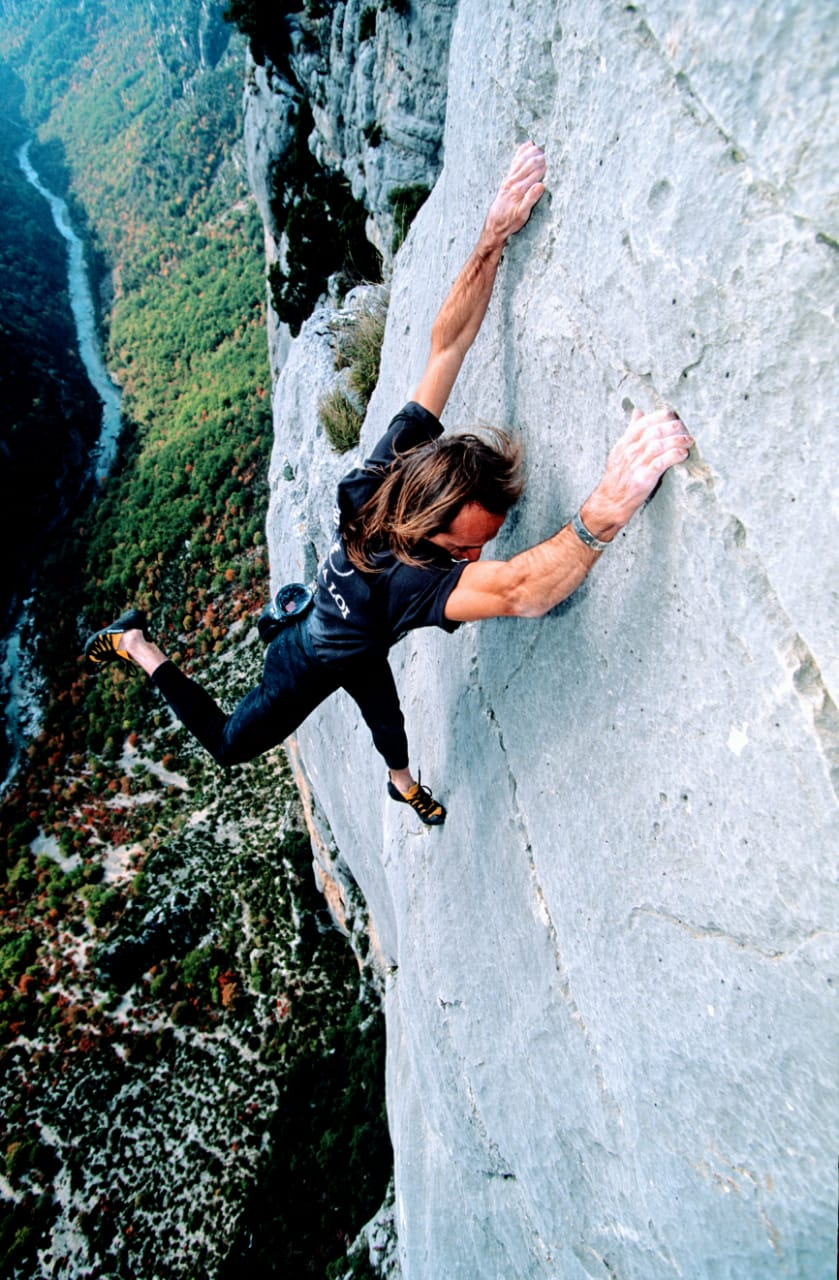
Free solo climbing in the Verdon Gorge

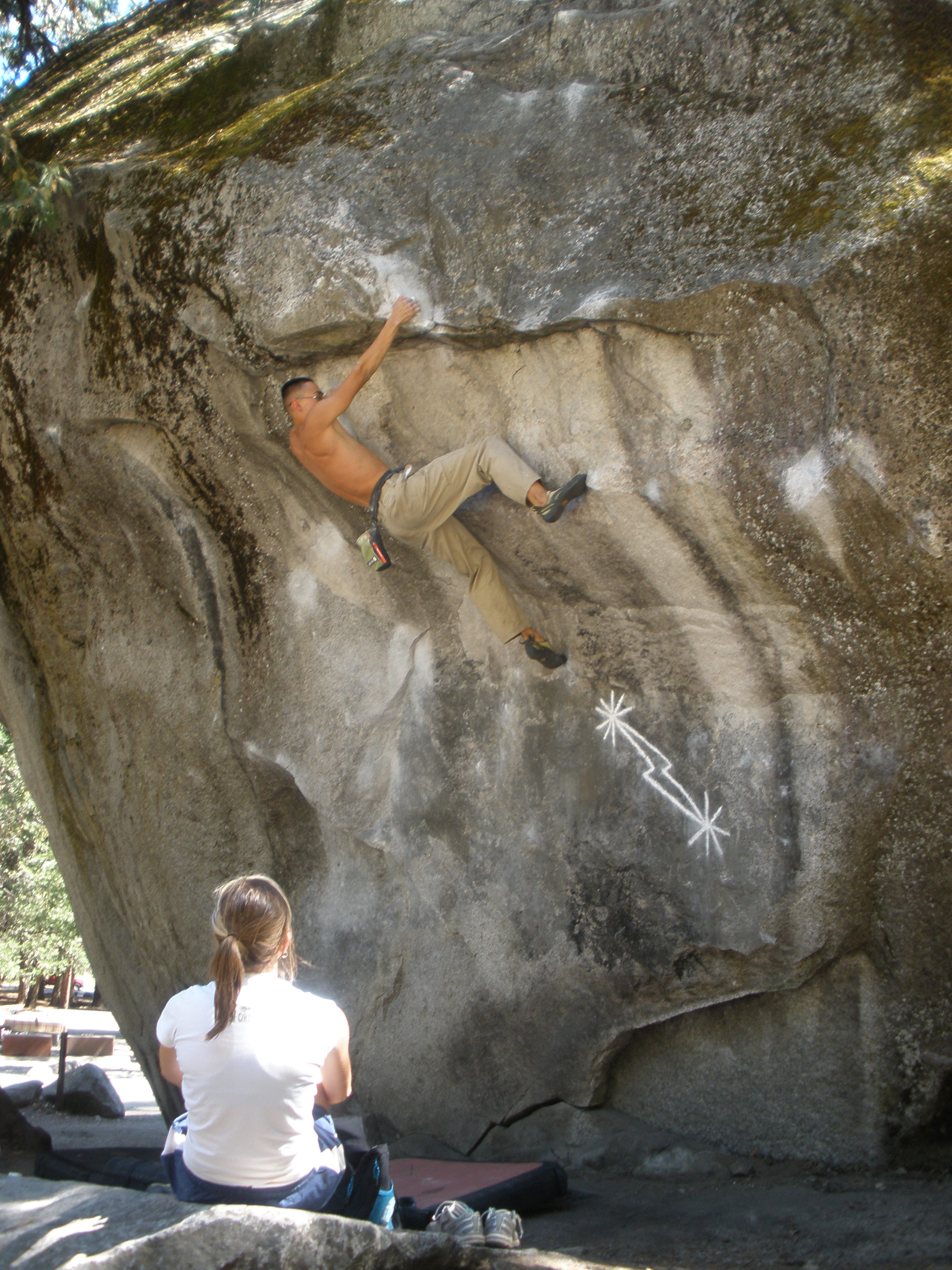
Bouldering on Midnight Lightning in Yosemite

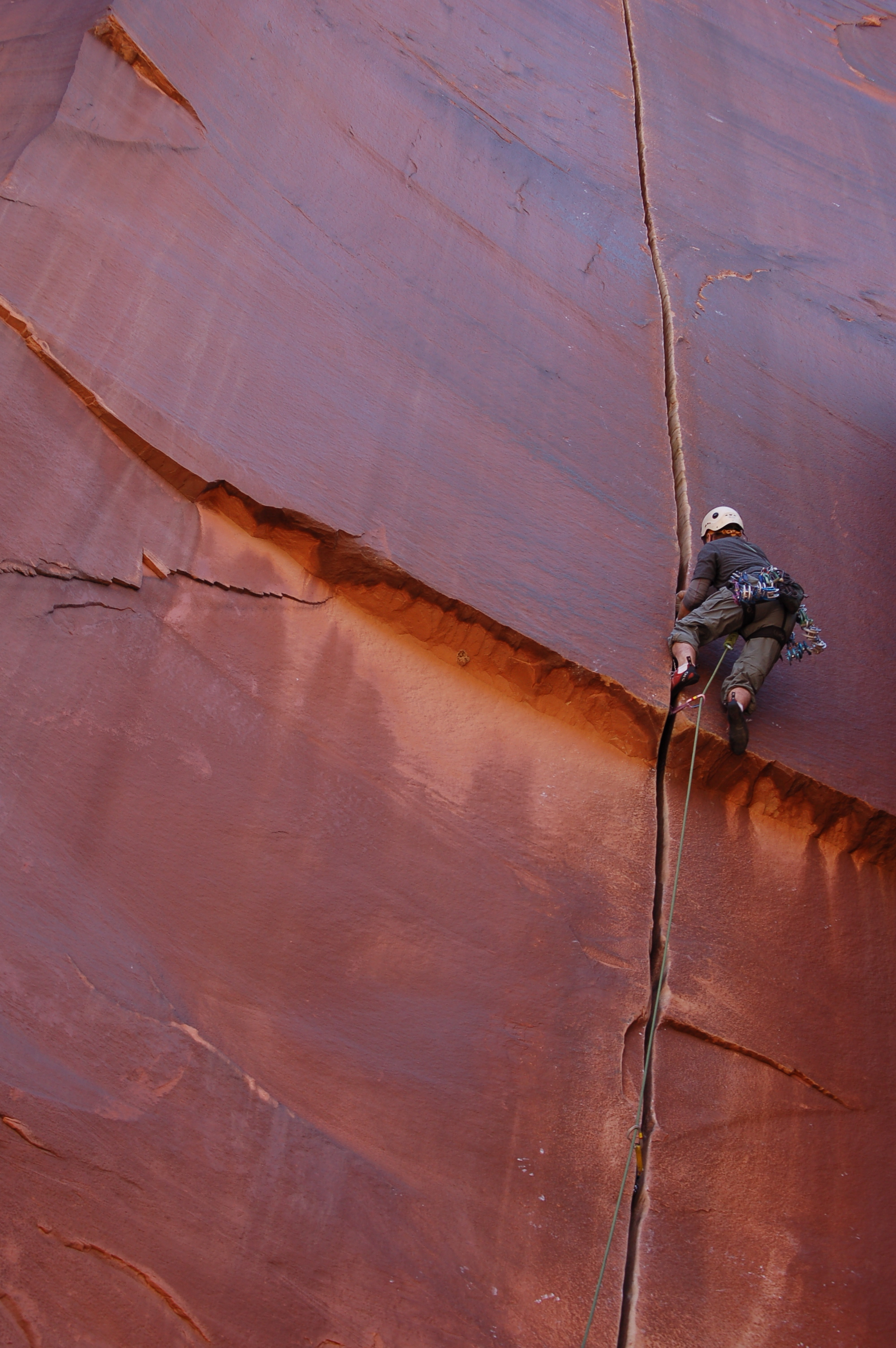
Traditional climbing on a crack in Indian Creek

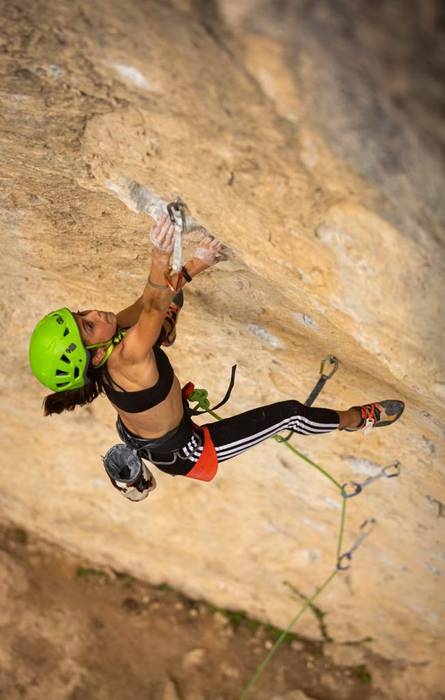
Sport climbing on a bolted route in Spain

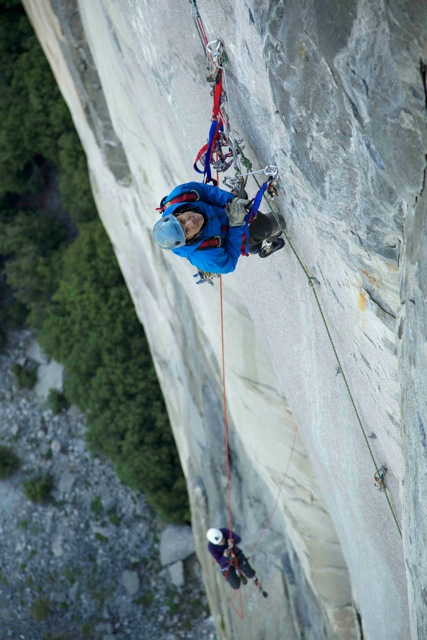
Big wall climbing on Zodiac on El Capitan

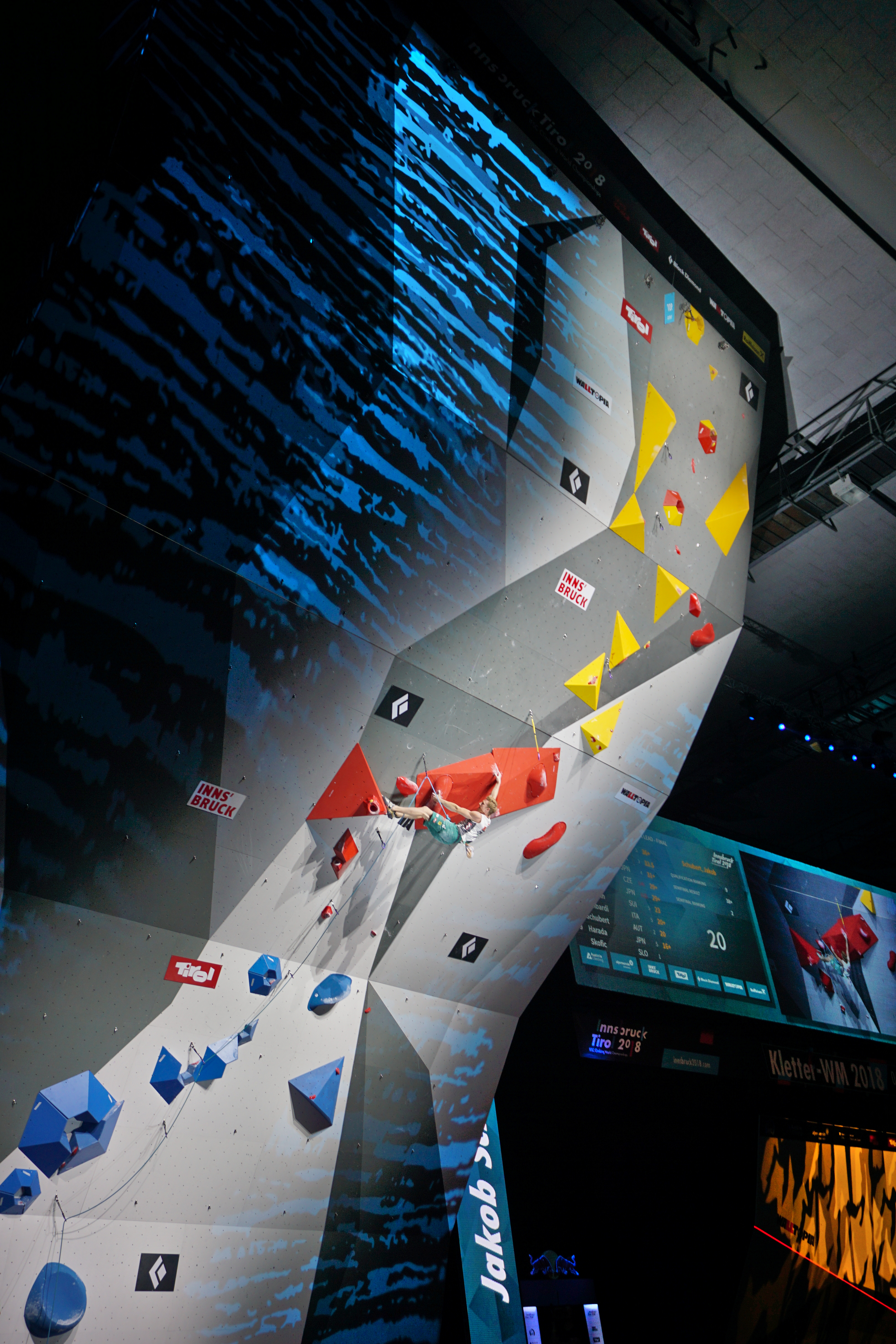
Competition climbing at the 2018 World Finals

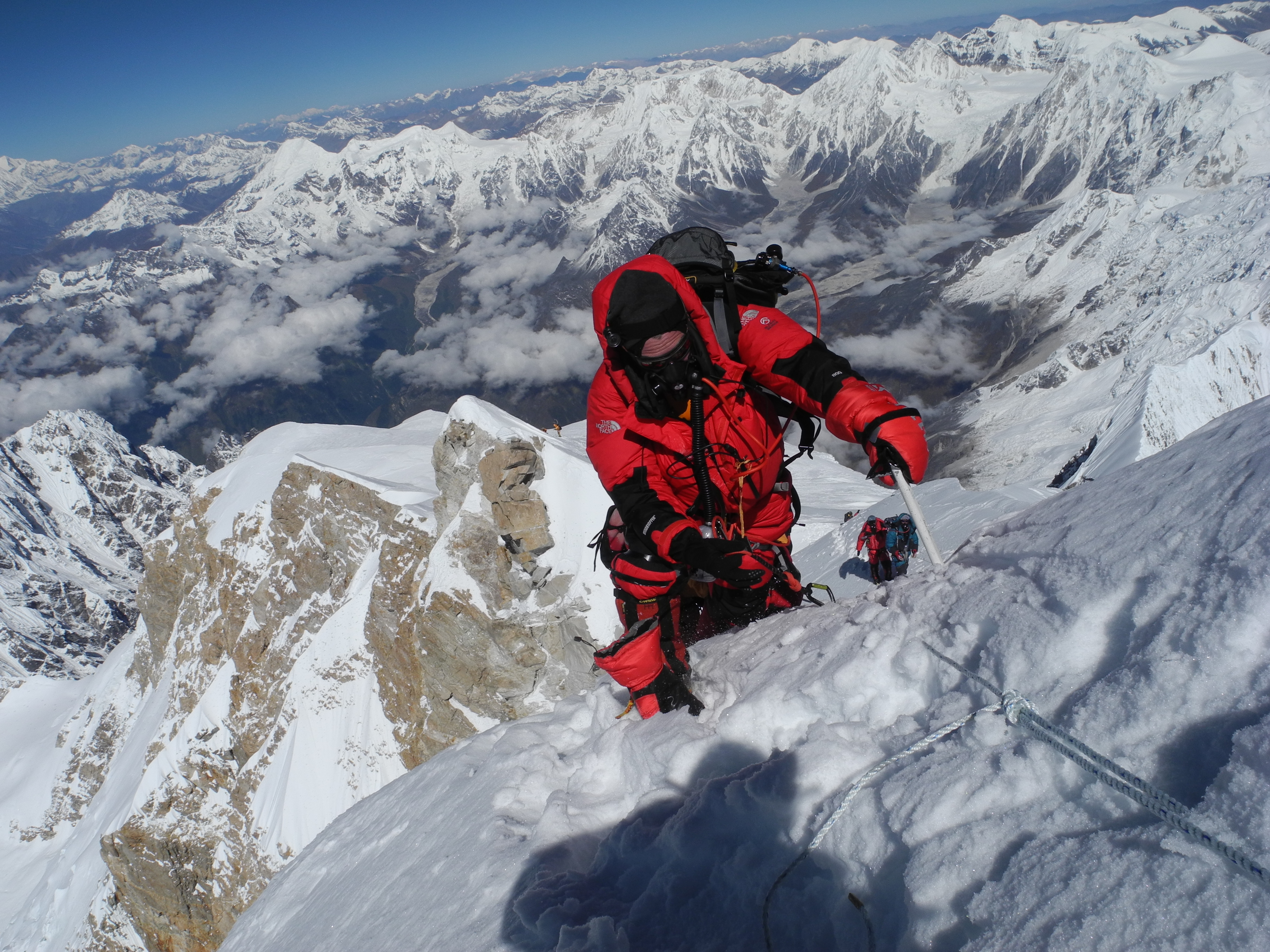
Mountaineering on the summit ridge of the eight-thousander, Manaslu

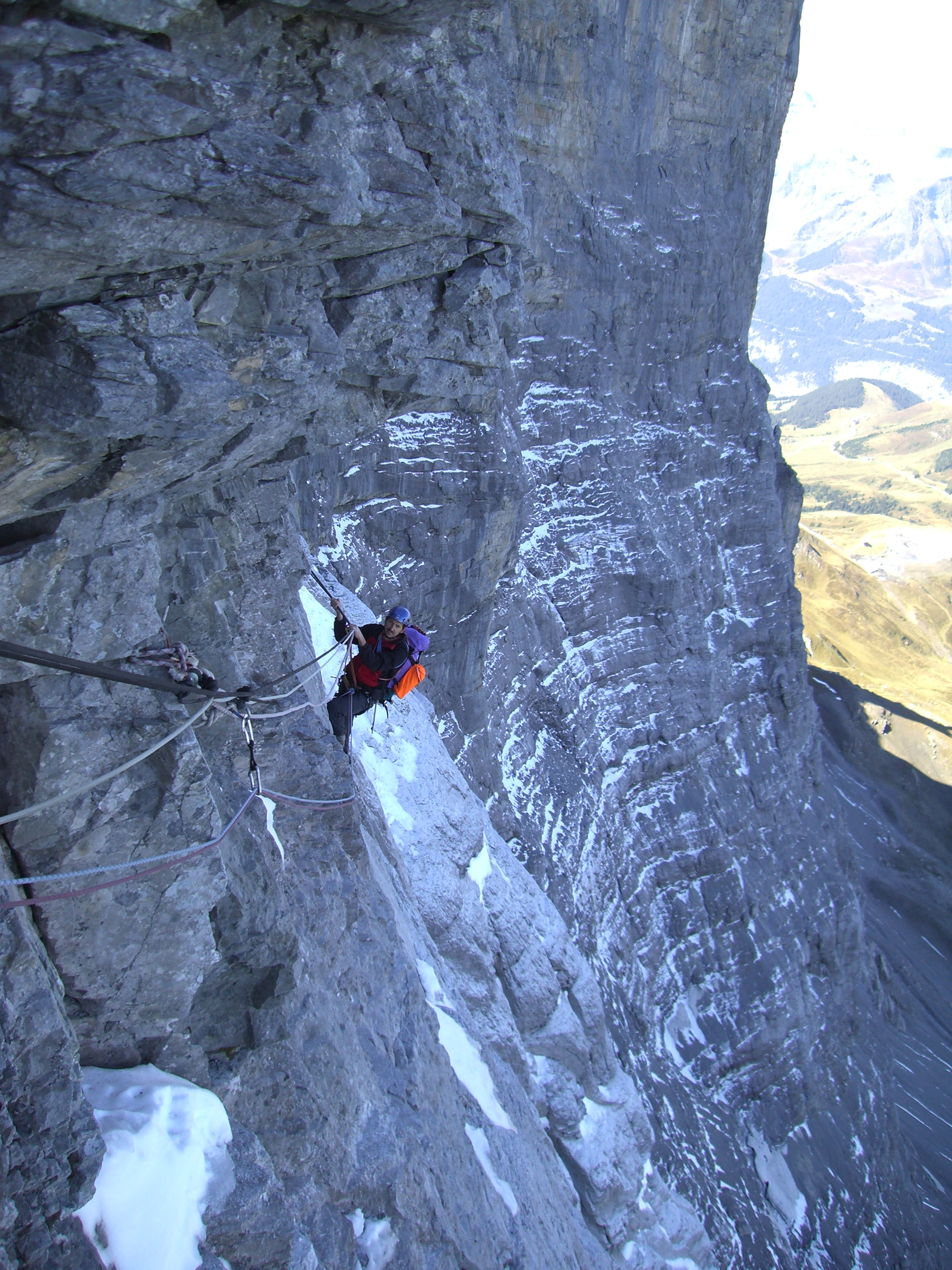
Alpine climbing on the north face of the Eiger

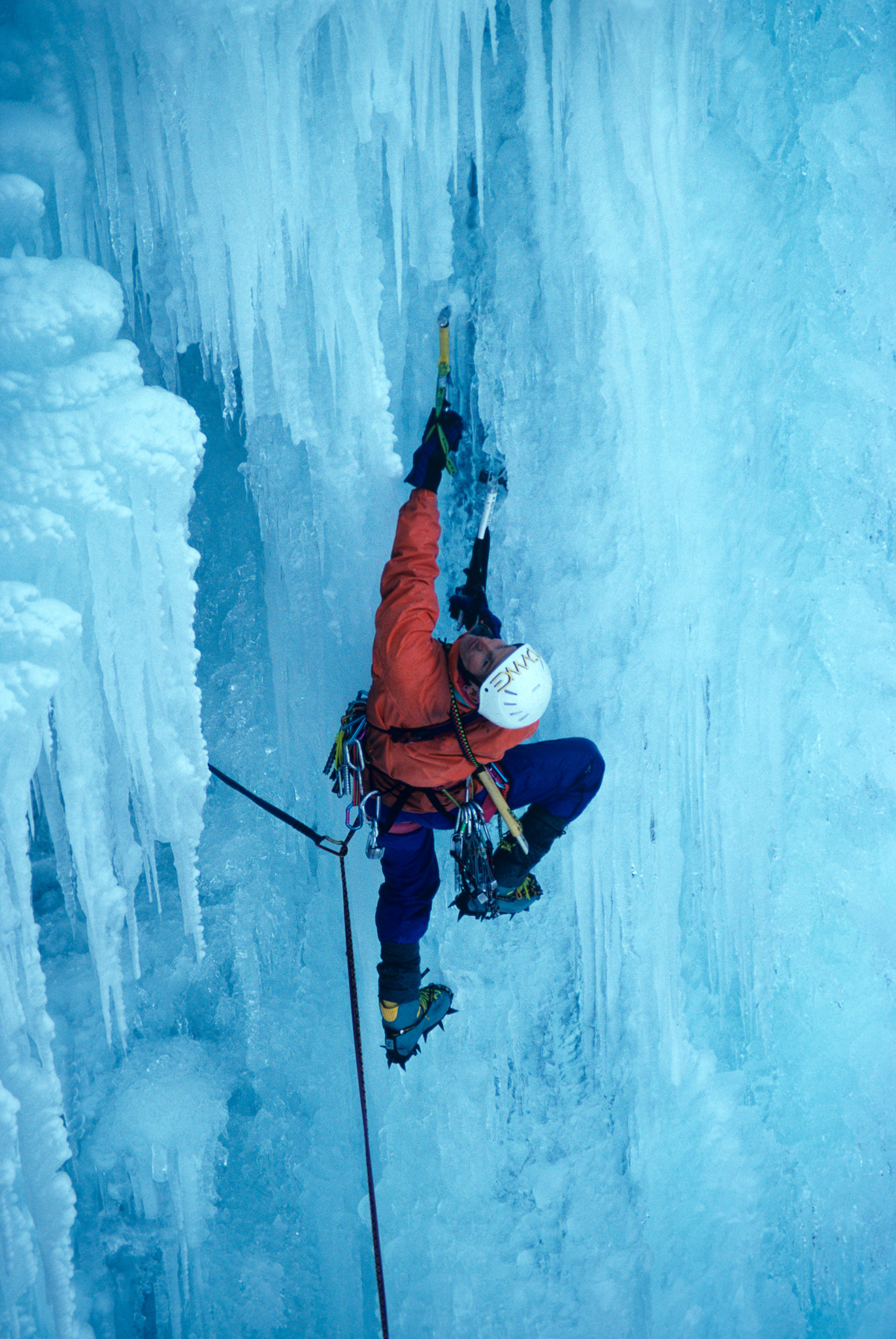
Ice climbing on Crack Baby in Switzerland

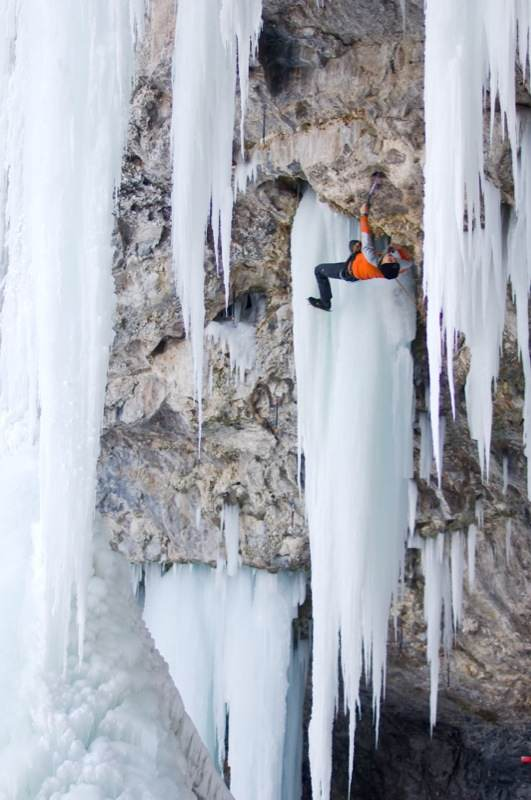
Mixed climbing in Glenwood, Colorado

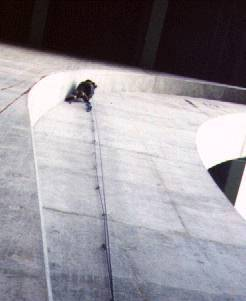
Buildering on the Doran Memorial Bridge

== See also ==
- List of climbers and mountaineers
- Glossary of climbing terms
