= Jerry Gallwas =

American rock climber (born 1936)

- Jerry Gallwas in 1950s, climbing near Yosemite Base Camp.
- Born: September 23, 1936 (age 90); California, U.S.
- Occupation: Business executive
- Known for: Big wall climbing
- Spouses: Margaret Ann Rogers 1960-1994; Sundari "Sandy" Krishnamurthy 1996-
- Children: Roger Ernst Gallwas, Heather Marie Cooney

Jerry Gallwas (born 1936) is an American rock climber active in the 1950s during the dawn of the Golden Age of Yosemite Rock Climbing. He achieved a number of pioneering first ascents including sandstone spires in the American Southwest, and the first ascent of the Northwest Face of Half Dome with Royal Robbins and Mike Sherrick in 1957. Gallwas made his own heat-treated chrome-molybdenum steel alloy pitons, which contributed to the success of the climb.

Gallwas studied chemistry at San Diego State University and spent much of his career working for scientific instrument maker Beckman Instruments, Inc. He helped to develop consensus standards for laboratory medicine, and served on the board of directors and as president of the National Committee for Clinical Laboratory Standards.

== Early life ==
Gerald Ernst (Jerry) Gallwas was born in Whittier, California, the only child of Ernst and Lois Gallwas. Gallwas' father held many jobs, including farmer, iron worker, and commercial fisherman. His mother was a schoolteacher. Both parents were outdoor enthusiasts.

Gallwas, a native of California, first showed an interest in climbing in junior high school. Using a Sierra Club publication drawing as a guide, he practiced rappelling on a hemp rope.

In 1950, Gallwas and his family vacationed in Yosemite National Park. On the front of Best Studio, now the Ansel Adams Gallery, Gallwas spied a picture of John Salathé standing on the tip of the Lost Arrow taking a photograph of his climbing partner, Anton Nelson, as Nelson was rappelling. Gallwas imagined one day taking a photo where Salathé stood. In 1954, Gallwas fulfilled that dream by completing the 5th ascent of the spire with Wayne Merry.

== Climbing experiences ==
In 1951, Gallwas began climbing with members of the Sierra Club from Southern California, including Royal Robbins and Don Wilson. The three became known as "The Southern Californians" to distinguish them from other California climbing groups. Gallwas described his relationship with Robbins and Wilson as teenage amateurs in tennis shoes. At Tahquitz (Lily Rock), the three honed their skills and dreamed of big climbs to come.

The vision started to become a reality when, in 1953, the three made the second ascent of the North Wall of Sentinel Rock. Robbins showed little interest in desert climbing, so Gallwas teamed with Wilson and Mark Powell to make a series of pioneering first ascents of sandstone spires in the American Southwest. These included Spider Rock, Cleopatra's Needle, and the Totem Pole. Bill Feuerer joined Gallwas, Wilson, and Powell on the Totem Pole ascent. Gallwas' final major ascent was the Northwest Face of Half Dome in the summer of 1957. On this climb, he teamed with Royal Robbins and Mike Sherrick. The Regular Northwest Face of Half Dome ascent was the first Grade VI climb in the United States.

== Acquiring and manufacturing climbing gear ==
In the early 1950s, most American climbers imported climbing equipment from Europe or acquired it from US Army surplus. Pitons from these sources were made of mild steel that twisted and became unusable after only a few placements. Gallwas recognized the problem and was among the first to make and use heat-treated chrome-molybdenum steel alloy pitons. He patterned his pitons after John Salathé's so they could be placed hundreds of times without twisting. These improved pitons proved instrumental to the success of the first ascent of the Northwest Face of Half Dome in 1957. That same year, Yvon Chouinard began to produce and sell alloy-steel pitons. Chouinard's success with his pitons led him to establish Chouinard Equipment, Ltd, which later became Black Diamond Equipment, Ltd.

== Notable ascents ==
- 1953 2nd ascent Yosemite Point Buttress. (With Royal Robbins)
- 1953 2nd ascent North Face Sentinel Rock. (With Royal Robbins and Don Wilson)
- 1953 Palisades Traverse Thunderbolt Peak to Mount Sill via North Palisade. (With Gary Hemming)
- 1954 5th ascent Lost Arrow Spire. (With Wayne Merry)
- 1955 3rd ascent Lost Arrow Chimney. (With Charles Wilts and Don Wilson)
- 1956 1st ascent Spider Rock, Canyon de Chelly National Monument, AZ, USA, March 30. (With Mark Powell and Don Wilson)
- 1956 1st ascent East Buttress of Middle Cathedral Rock, Yosemite National Park, CA, USA, June 16. (With Mark Powell and Don Wilson)
- 1956 5th ascent Castle Rock Spire. (With Charles Wilts)
- 1956 1st ascent Cleopatra's Needle, Valley of the Thundering Water, NM, USA, September 6. (With Mark Powell and Don Wilson)
- 1957 1st ascent The Step, Tahquitz Idyllwild, CA, USA, May 18. (With Royal Robbins)
- 1957 1st ascent Totem Pole, Monument Valley, AZ, USA. June 13. (With Bill Feuerer, Mark Powell, and Don Wilson)
- 1957 1st ascent Northwest Face of Half Dome, Yosemite, CA, USA, June 23–27. First grade VI climb in America. (With Mike Sherrick and Royal Robbins)

== Business career ==
Gallwas studied chemistry at San Diego State University. He later ran a clinical chemistry laboratory while serving in the Army Medical Corps. In 1964, he went on to work in diagnostics for scientific instrument maker Beckman Instruments, Inc. In 1972, Gallwas served as a spokesperson for the adoption of voluntary consensus standards for laboratory medicine as the Food and Drug Administration began to regulate the medical device industry. Gallwas served on the board of directors of the National Committee for Clinical Laboratory Standards, now the Clinical Laboratory Standards Institute for ten years and was its president from 1982 to 1984.

== Philanthropy ==
Gallwas met Beckman Instruments founder Dr. Arnold Beckman and his wife, Mabel, within a few weeks of joining the company. Their friendship led to Gallwas' 40-year affiliation with the Arnold and Mabel Beckman Foundation. Gallwas is credited with collecting and displaying Arnold Beckman's earliest inventions that helped launch the electronic revolution in the chemical and biological sciences. The inventions are displayed at the Arnold and Mabel Beckman Center of the National Academies of Science and Engineering in Irvine, CA. Additional exhibits that Gallwas collected are housed at the Chemical Heritage Foundation, now the Science History Institute in Philadelphia and at the Beckman Institute for Advanced Science and Technology at the University of Illinois at Urbana Champaign.
