= Open Book (climb) =

Rock climbing route, California

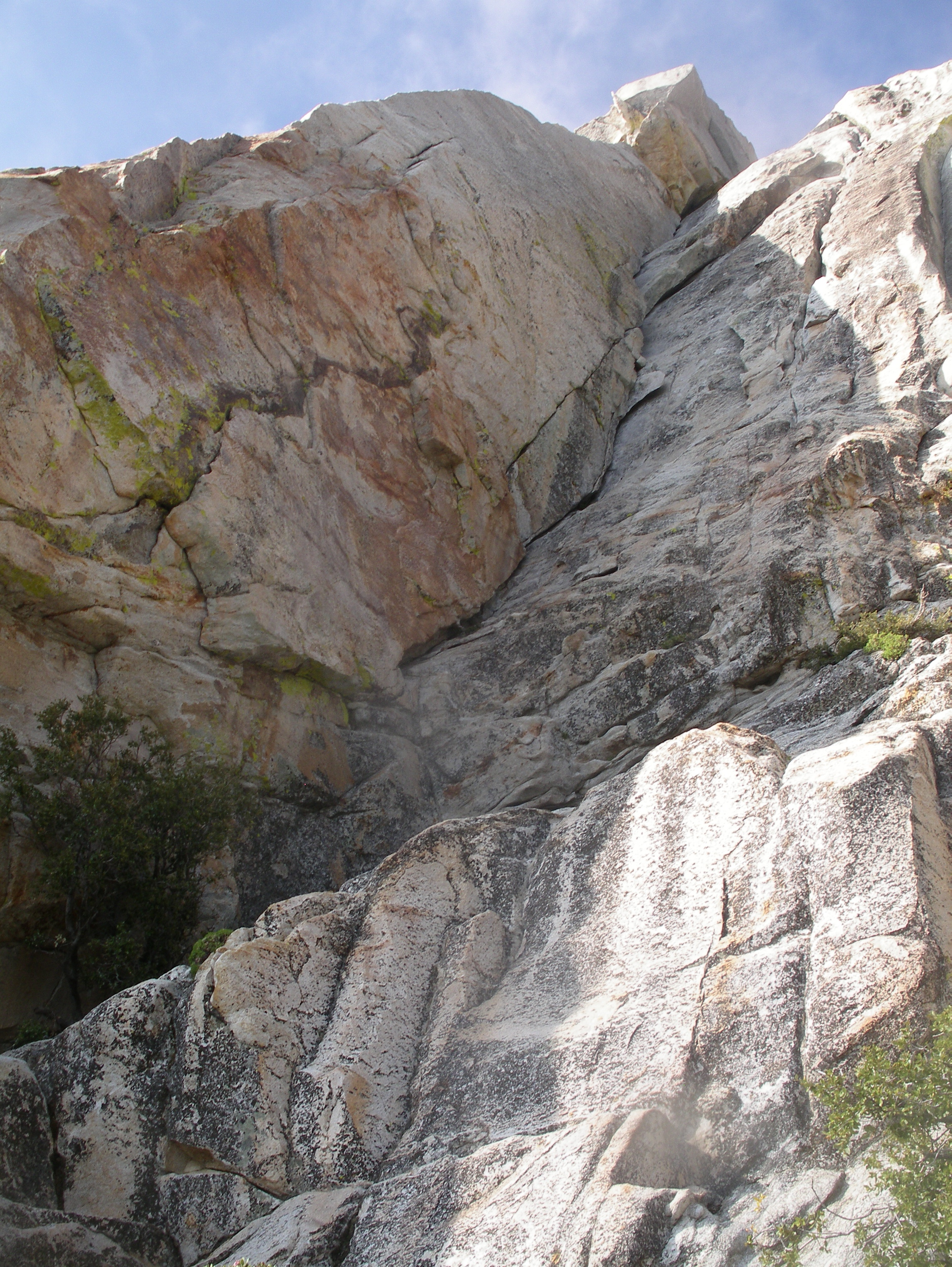
- The first two pitches follow the obvious inside corner
- Location: Tahquitz Peak, California, United States
- Coordinates: 33.7605°N 116.685°W
- Climbing area: Tahquitz Rock
- Route type: Traditional climbing
- Vertical gain: 300 feet
- Pitches: 3
- Technical grade: 5.9 (5c)
- First ascent: John Mendenhall & Harry Sutherland, 1947.
- First free ascent: Royal Robbins & Don Wilson, 1952.

Open Book is a traditional climbing route at Tahquitz Rock, in Riverside County, California. Since the Yosemite Decimal System was developed at Tahquitz it is no coincidence that the first climb to be rated 5.9, Open Book, is also located at Tahquitz. In 1952, when Royal Robbins climbed it free, it was one of the most difficult free ascents in the country.
