= Nut (climbing) =

Protection equipment in rock climbing

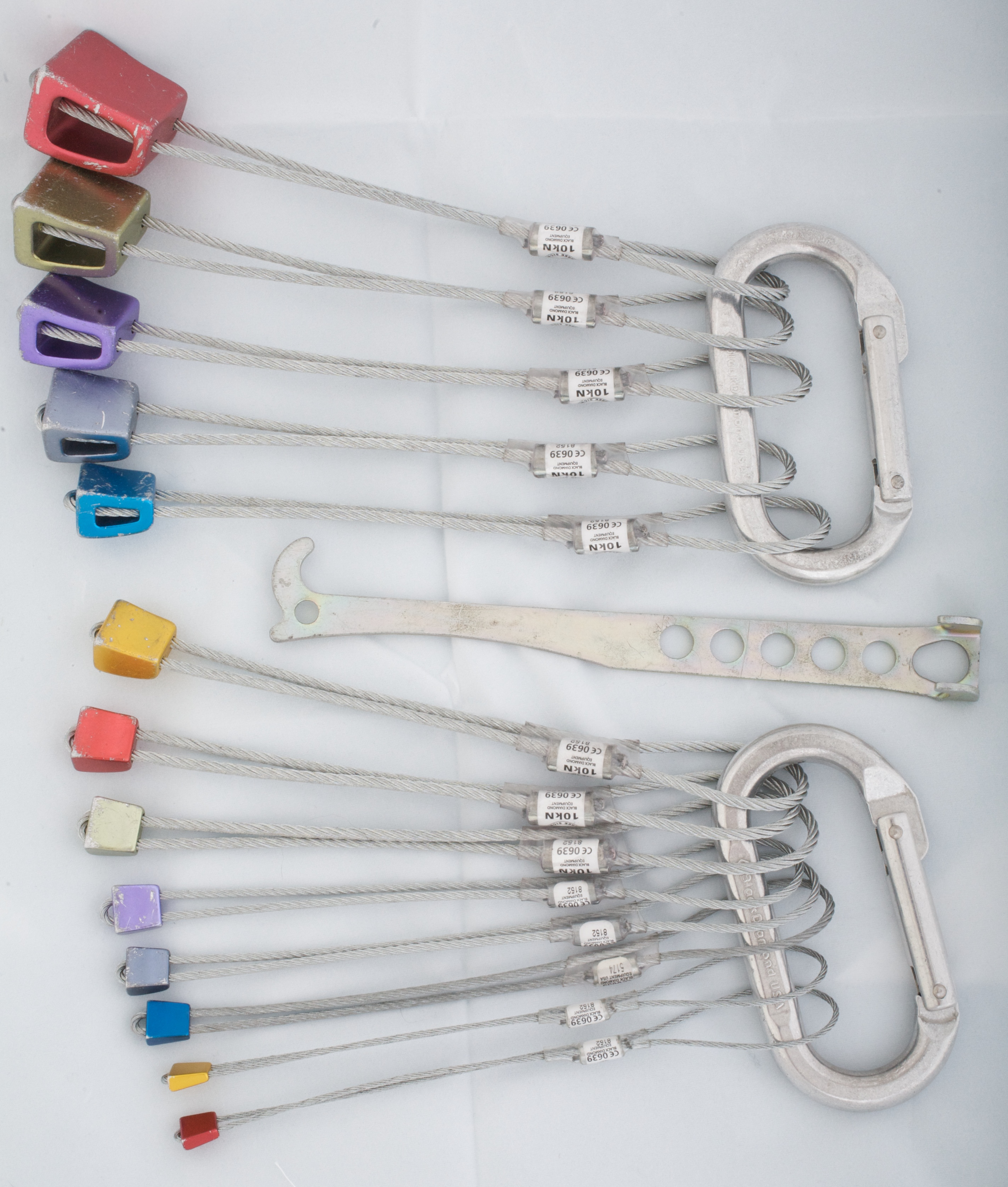
Two sets of nuts with a removal tool between them

In rock climbing, a nut (or chock or chockstone or wire for the smallest versions) is a metal wedge threaded on a wire that climbers use for protection by wedging it into a crack in the rock. Quickdraws are clipped to the nut wire by the ascending climber and the rope threads through the quickdraw. Nuts come in a variety of sizes and styles, and several different brands are made by competing manufacturers. Most nuts are made of aluminum. Larger nuts may be threaded on Dyneema cord instead of wire, but this has become unusual.

The very smallest nuts are known as micronuts and may be made of brass or other metal, and typically have their wires soldered into them, instead of looped through drilled holes. They are mostly used in aid climbing, and their value as protection, arresting a climber's fall, is marginal because of both their low breaking strength and their tiny surface area (the HB 0 measures about 4 x 7 x 2.5 mm) in contact with the rock, though this can be offset if several are placed at a time. Other names used include RPs (the brand name of the first commercially available micronuts) and brassies. They are available from several manufacturers in a variety of styles.

British climbers in the 1950s and 1960s were the first to use nuts as climbing protection. In addition to using pitons, they picked up machine nuts from the side of railway tracks, climbed with them in their pockets, and used them as artificial chocks. This developed to the point where they drilled the thread from the middle, threaded them with slings, and used them in cracks.

Nuts or chockstones are named after natural stones occasionally found wedged into cracks. Climbers eventually realized they could insert their own found pebble into a suitable crack. In an article called "Artificial Aids in Mountaineering" dated Oct-Dec 1956, G Sutton wrote about jammed knots for direct aid. He also compared the use of slings, chocks (rocks) and jammed knots to artificial climbing (aid climbing) and that "there should be no illusion that the use of a chockstone is in any way more admirable than that of a piton."

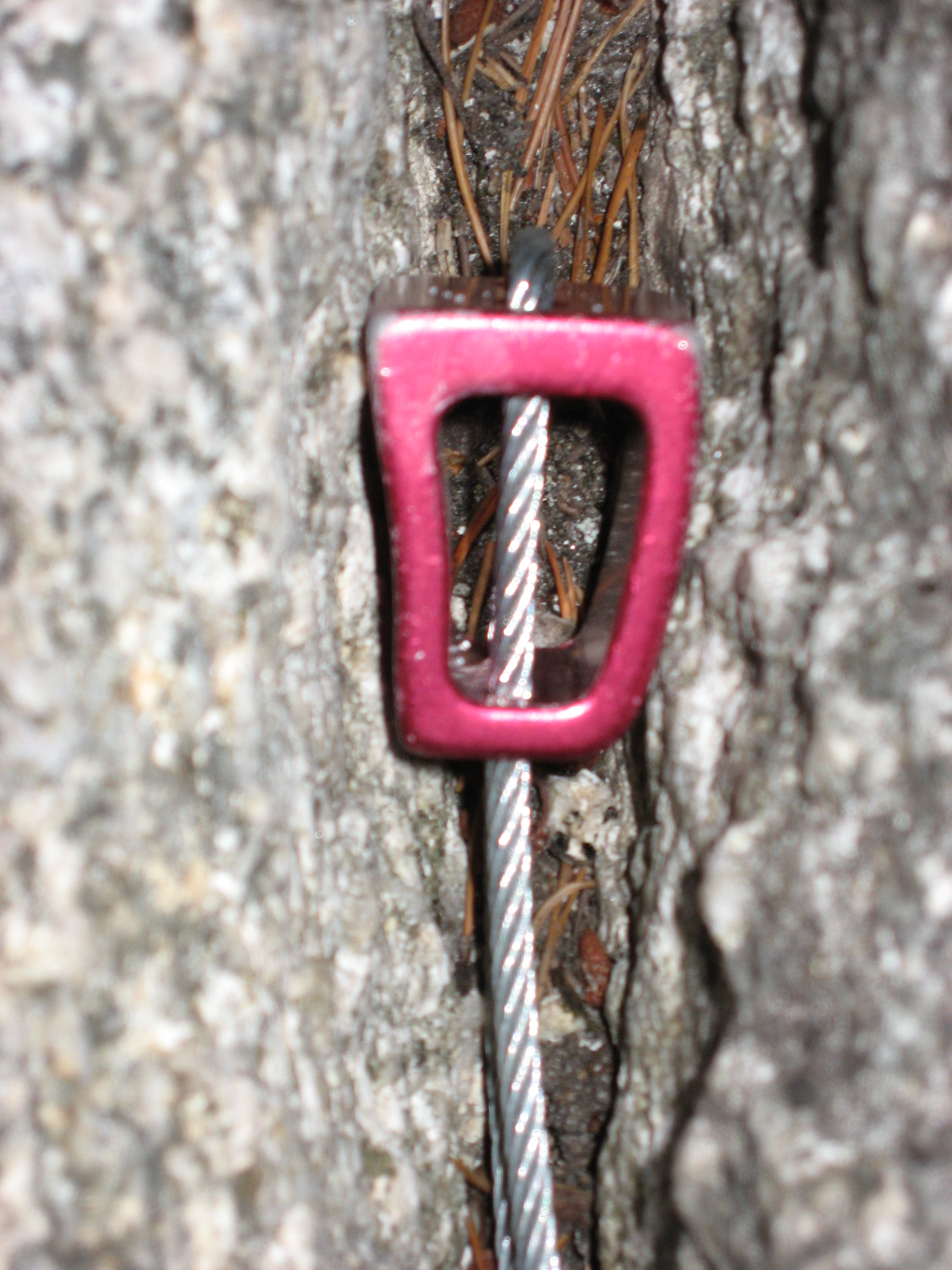
Climbing nut in use

By 1967 Royal Robbins saw the need for clean climbing and put up Nutcracker, an all nut protected 6 pitch climb, on the Manure Pile (Ranger Rock), Yosemite. In 1972, when clean climbing became an issue in the US, Yvon Chouinard began manufacturing chocks made specifically for rock climbing, with the familiar wedge shape still in use today. With Tom Frost, Chouinard invented a larger, six-sided nut called a Hexentric or hex. Prominent climbers like Henry Barber and John Stannard helped popularize the use of nuts, especially after it was discovered that a nut was lighter and easier to place and remove while climbing, as well as being at least as secure as a well-placed piton, and less damaging to the rock.

Nuts are available in different shapes to help the climber find the best fit for a given crack. Curved nuts have a concave face on one side and a convex face on the other. Larger nuts can be placed in either of two aspects (hexes in three aspects) to suit different-width cracks, with either the main faces or the sides in contact with the rock.

Nuts may be generically referred to as wires or stoppers, though "Stopper" is a brand name of a nut made by Black Diamond Equipment.
