= Rock-climbing equipment =

Tools and gear to assist in climbing

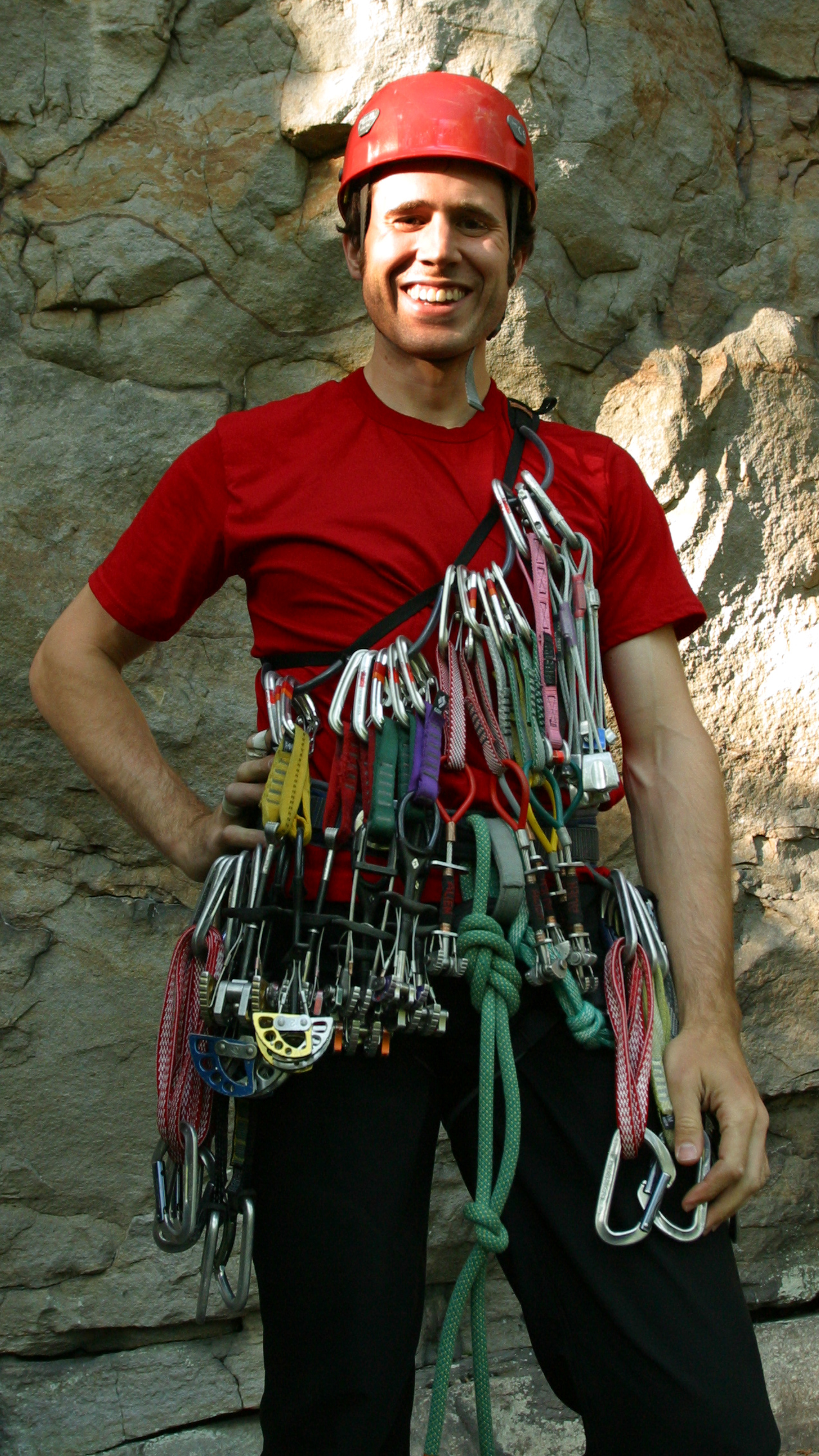
Rock climber with a helmet, harness, rope, a traditional climbing "rack" of protection devices on their harness and additional gear sling, which contains SLCDs, nuts, a tricam, and quickdraws

Rock-climbing equipment varies with the specific type of climbing that is being undertaken by the climber(s). Bouldering needs the least equipment: climbing shoes, climbing chalk and optional crash pads. Sport climbing adds ropes, harnesses, belay devices, and quickdraws which clip into pre-drilled permanently-fixed bolts on the rock face. Traditional climbing adds the need to carry a "rack" of temporary and removable passive and active protection devices. Multi-pitch climbing, and the related big wall climbing, adds devices to assist in ascending and descending static fixed ropes. Finally, aid climbing uses unique equipment to give mechanical assistance to the climber in their upward movement (e.g. aiders).

Advances in rock-climbing equipment design and manufacture are a key part of the rock climbing history, starting with the climbing rope. Modern rock-climbing devices enable climbers to perform tasks that were previously done manually, but with greater control – in all conditions – and with less effort. Examples of such replacements include the harness (replaced tying the rope around the waist), the carabiner (replaced many knots), the descender/abseil device (replaced the dülfersitz), the ascender (replaced the prusik knot), the belay device (replaced the body belay), and nuts/hexes (replaced chockstones).

Modern rock-climbing equipment includes dynamic ropes, plyometric training tools, advanced spring-loaded camming devices (SLCDs) for protection, and advanced rope control devices such as self-locking devices (SLDs), progress capture devices (PCDs), and assisted braking devices (ABDs). Modern equipment uses advanced materials that are increasingly more durable, stronger, and lighter (e.g. spectra/dyneema and aluminum alloys) than traditional equipment. The equipment must meet specific quantitative standards (e.g. the UIAA standards) for strength, durability, and reliability, and must be certified and tested against such standards with individual pieces of equipment carrying such certification marks.

== Use and certification ==
=== Type of climbing ===
The rock-climbing equipment needed varies materially depending on the type of rock climbing being undertaken. Starting from the least equipment-intensive type of climbing, the general equipment needs are as follows:

- Free solo climbing, and its deep-water soloing variant, require the least equipment as no climbing protection or ropes are used. Equipment is generally limited to climbing shoes and chalk with a chalk bag.
- Bouldering, and its competition bouldering variant, uses the same basic equipment of free soloing but with the optional addition of bouldering mats, which are also called crash mats or crash pads.
- Top rope climbing, and its competition speed climbing variant, adds a rope, harness, and belay device. The rope is hung prior to the climb from the anchor point at the top, typically by carabiners, slings, or cord, or some combination thereof.
- Sport climbing, and its competition lead climbing variant, adds quickdraws that are clipped into the pre-drilled on-site bolts while the climber is lead climbing the route. No additional climbing protection is needed.
- Traditional climbing requires most of the equipment of the above disciplines but with the addition of extensive climbing protection equipment (nuts, hexes, and SLCDs), which the climber will insert while lead climbing the route. The weight of the extra protection may require a stronger harness or a gear sling.
- Multi-pitch climbing, which can be done in sport or traditional formats, requires added rope devices like ascenders and descenders for moving up and down fixed-ropes. The big wall variant requires heavy-duty rope devices for carrying more gear such as portaledges and provisions, which are carried in haul bags.
- Rope solo climbing is done in many formats (sport, traditional, multi-pitch), and needs an extensive range of rope devices as every pitch needs to be solo climbed (using self-locking devices or SLDs), descended back down (using descenders), and then re-ascended (using ascenders). The simpler variant of top rope solo climbing, only requires the SLDs.
- Aid climbing, and its clean aid climbing variant, is usually done in a traditional format and also more likely on multi-pitch and big wall routes. In addition to the standard equipment for such routes, aid climbing uses specialist equipment such as aiders and daisy chains, as well as hammers for pitons and copperheads.

=== Certification ===
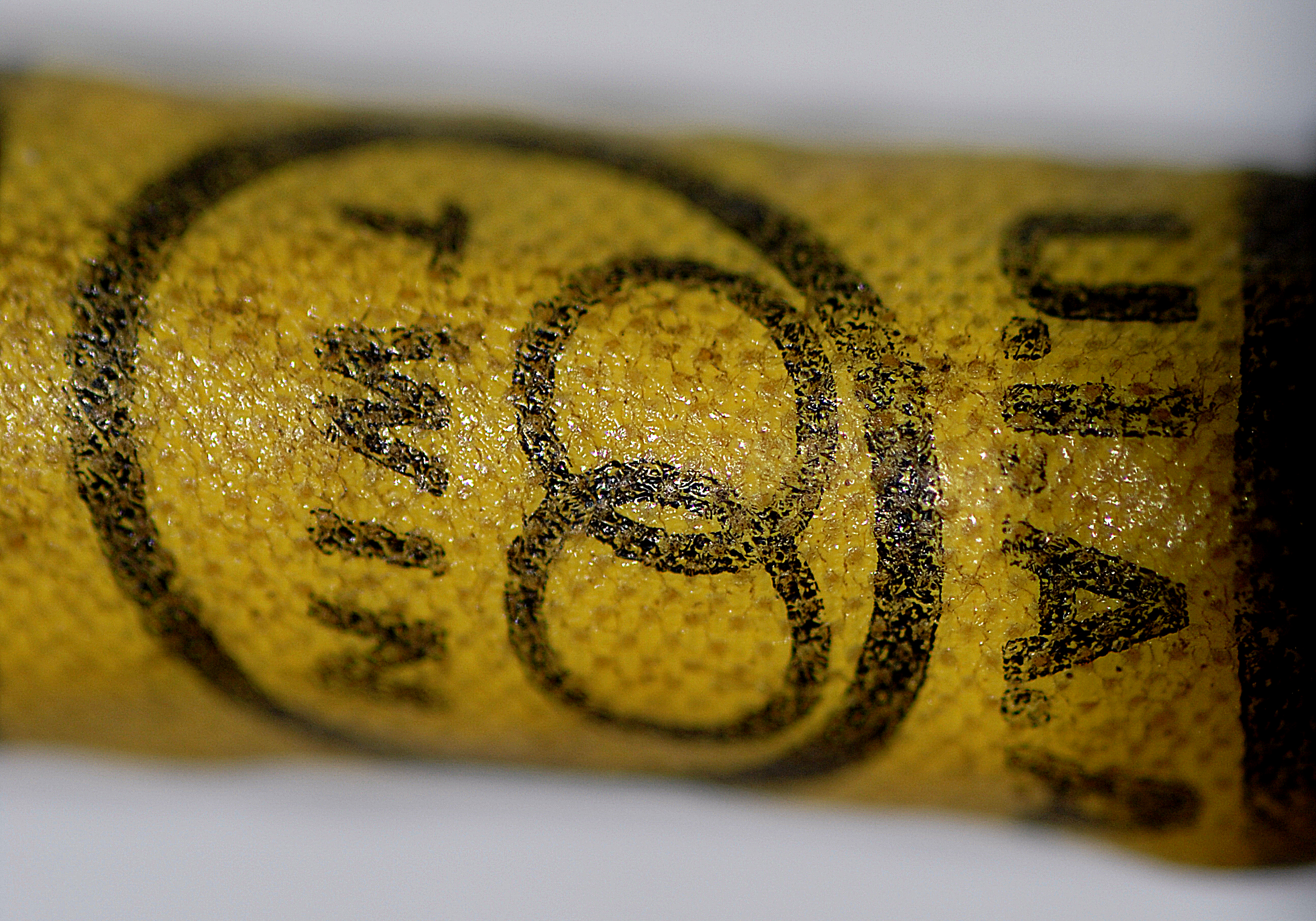
UIAA-certified twin ropes

Rock-climbing equipment is broadly classed as Personal Protective Equipment (PPE). The International Climbing and Mountaineering Federation (known as the UIAA) was an important early body—and the only body pre-1995—in setting standards for climbing equipment. The UIAA Safety Commission continues to play a central worldwide role in this area. The European Committee for Standardization (CEN) is also an important major regulatory body for PPE, and which works closely with the UIAA Safety Commission through its CEN Working Group for Mountaineering Equipment.

North America has fewer specific regulations as rock-climbing equipment is not classed as military or professional PPE and thus does not fall under the American Occupational Safety and Health Administration (OSHA) regulations; in effect, the UIAA and CEN have become the most important bodies for setting standards and regulating rock-climbing equipment worldwide, and most major manufacturers, and distributors, produce equipment certified and stamped with UIAA and CE marking. After the United Kingdom left the European Union, it adopted the UKCA certification in place of the CEN.

== Ropes and slings ==
=== Ropes ===
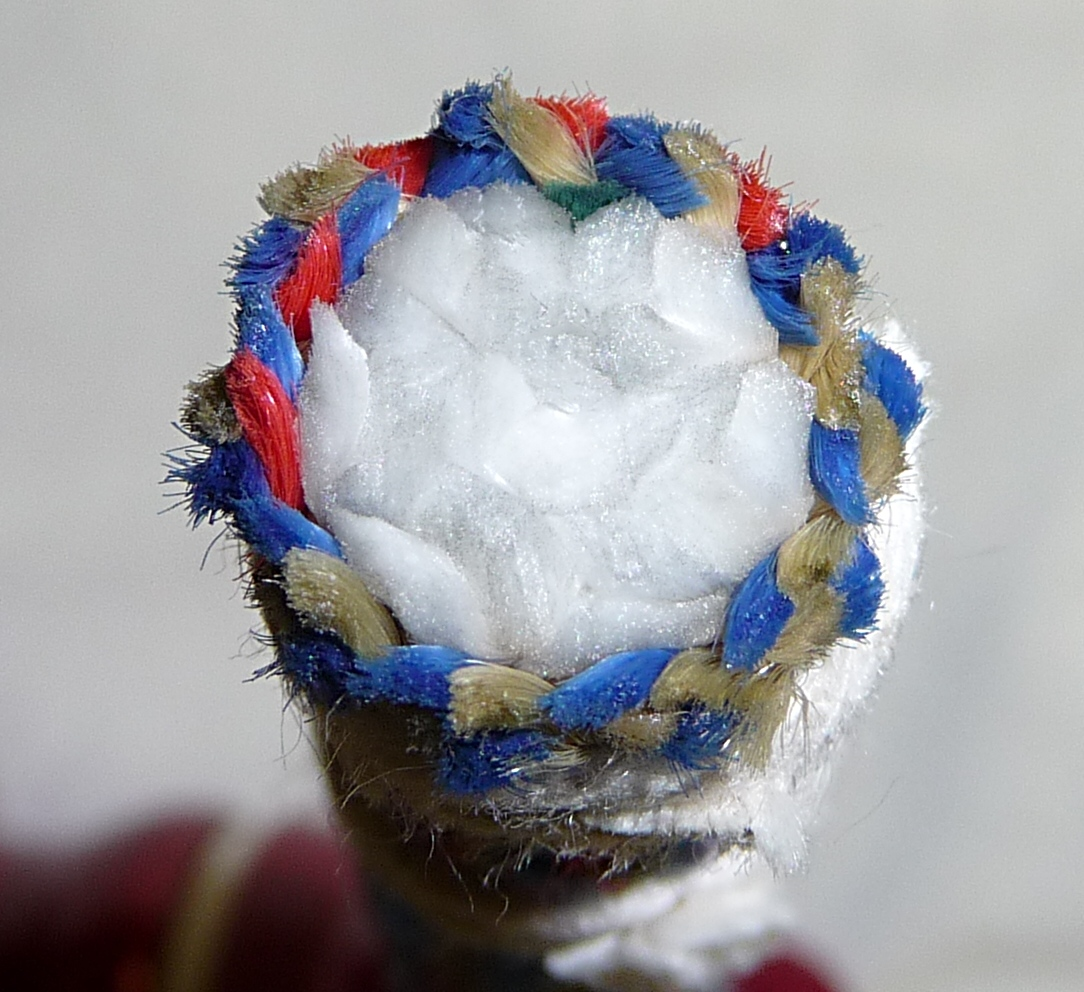
Cross-section of 10.7 mm kernmantle dynamic rope

Modern climbing ropes are 50–80 metres (160–260 ft) in length—the longer versions are for multi-pitch climbing—and have a kernmantle construction consisting of a core kern of twisted nylon fibers and an outer sheath mantle of woven colored coarse nylon fibers. They are either dynamic ropes, which can stretch to absorb the energy of a falling climber, or are the less expensive but more hard-wearing static ropes, which are only for use in constant-load situations such as descending (e.g. abseiling) and ascending (e.g. jumaring).

Some climbers will use a single full-thickness climbing rope with a diameter of approximately 9 to 11 mm (0.35 to 0.43 in), and some will use double ropes, or "half-ropes", to reduce rope drag (e.g. one rope is clipped into any given anchor or protection point), which have a reduced thickness of approximately 8 to 9 mm (0.31 to 0.35 in) to limit the weight of the extra rope. Twin roping uses two thinner ropes, typically 7 to 8 mm (0.28 to 0.31 in) in thickness, which are both clipped into each protection point. Twin roping is thus not used for reducing rope drag, but to have a backup rope on long climbs.

=== Slings ===
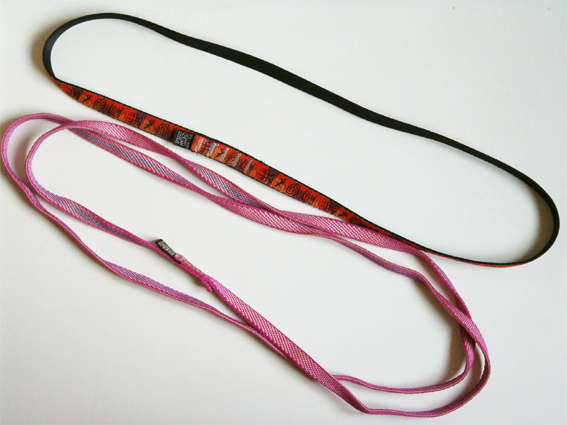
Sets of sewn webbing slings

Modern webbing (or "tape") is made of strong tubular nylon or the even stronger spectra/dyneema material. Climbers use webbing that has been sewn using a certified standard of reinforced stitching into various lengths of closed loops called "slings" (or "runners"). They can be used in a wide range of situations, including wrapping around sections of rock for abseiling, creating belay anchors, or as passive protection, or tied to other equipment—often via carabiners—to create a longer version of a quickdraw or a makeshift lanyard.

Slings can be made into more complex pieces of equipment such as the daisy chain, which is used in aid climbing, and the personal anchor system, which is used in securing a climber to a fixed anchor point.

=== Cords ===
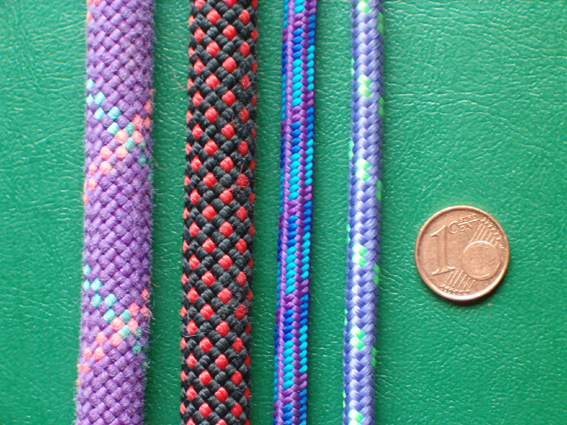
Rope (two on left) and cord (two on right) thicknesses compared

While lengths of webbing can be tied via a knot, such as a water knot, to create custom-length loops instead of the pre-sewn fixed-length slings, their load-bearing capacity can be materially reduced making them less safe. Climbers instead use cord (or "accessory cord"), which is a length of thinner approximately 4 to 8 mm (0.16 to 0.31 in) static kernmantle rope, tied via a double fisherman's knot into closed loops of any size.

Cord loops (also known as "cordelettes") serve a wide variety of functions in rock climbing. Uses include creating friction prusik knots for ascending or gripping fixed climbing ropes, usually using thinner approximately 5 to 6 mm (0.20 to 0.24 in) cord, or for attaching to, and equalizing forces across, multiple fixed anchors points, such as when setting up abseil or belay anchors on multi-pitch climbing routes, usually using thicker approximately 7 to 8 mm (0.28 to 0.31 in) cord.

== Rope connectors ==
Several modern pieces of rope connecting equipment help climbers to securely attach items to the climbing rope, such as themselves via a modern climbing harness, or their various protection devices via modern carabiners and quickdraws. Before the invention of these pieces of rope-connecting equipment, climbers used alternative techniques such as looping the rope around the body instead of a harness (e.g. the body belay) and looping the rope around various rocks as a form of protection. In addition to these early techniques, climbers also used various climbing knots to tie ropes and anchor points together, which are now all replaced by rope-connecting equipment such as carabiners.

=== Carabiners ===
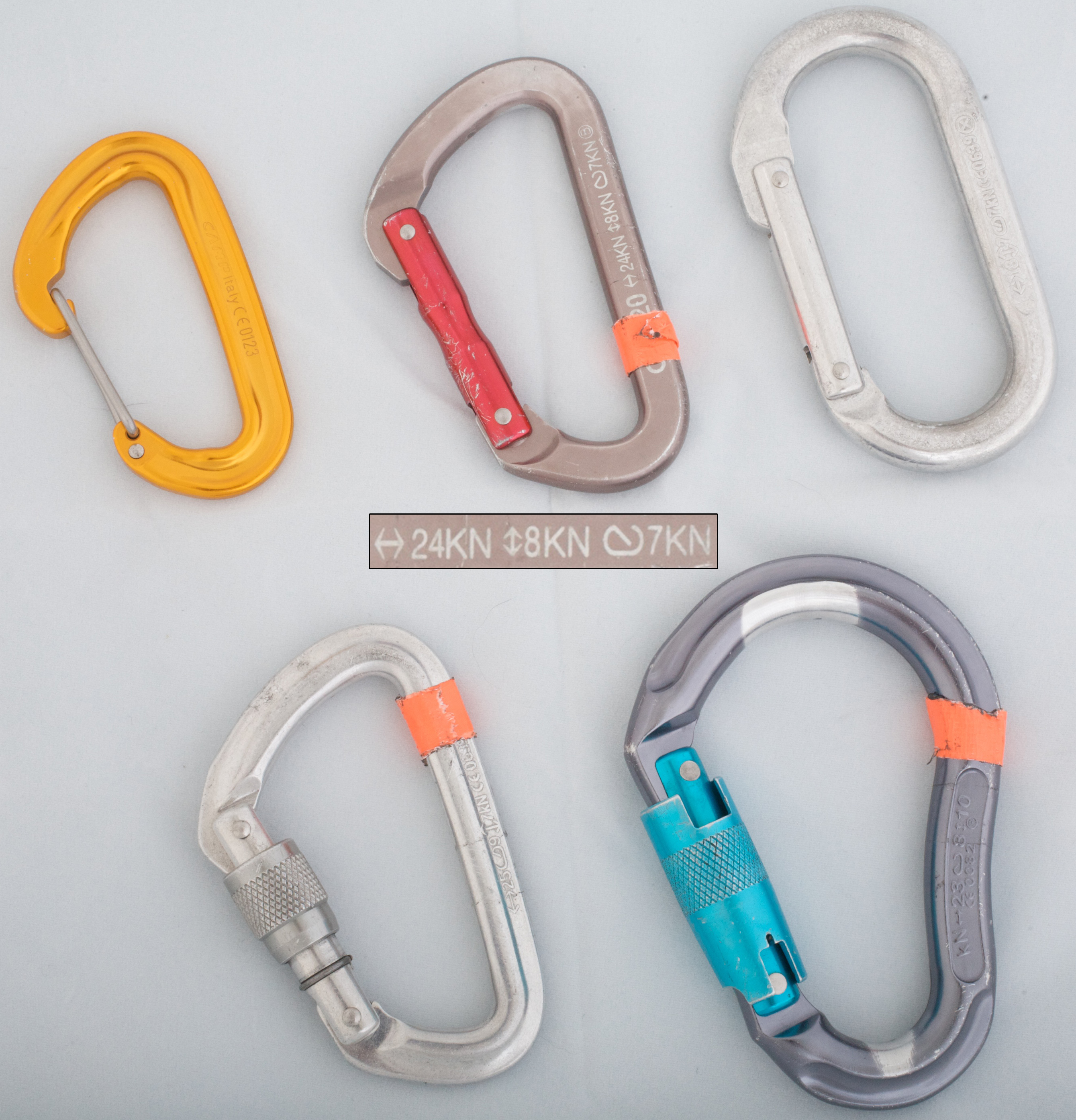
Non-locking (top) and locking (bottom) carabiners

Carabiners are closed metal clips with spring-loaded gates that are used as connectors between the rope and various devices. Modern carabiners are made from a lightweight but strong aluminum alloy that can withstand the load of a fall. Carabiners come in various shapes, with the asymmetric/offset D-shape being the most common, and gate styles (e.g. a straight gate or a bent gate). A particular variation is whether the gate is locking, which gives extra security when belaying but makes the carabiner heavier and slightly tricker to clip into, or non-locking, which is the easiest to clip into and out of for example when leading a bolted sport climbing route but with the risk that the gate may unintentionally open.

=== Harnesses ===
Climbing harnesses are used for connecting the rope to the climber via a "belay loop" on the harness. Harnesses are made of strong materials to specific strength guidelines that can withstand the load of a major fall. There are many types of harness designs and materials used depending on the type of climbing undertaken. Examples include minimal "sit" harnesses for sport climbing as they require little in the way of gear-carrying loops, lightweight and detachable leg-loop harnesses for alpine climbing that fit around heaving winter clothing, padded harnesses for big wall climbing that give comfort for hanging belays and abseils, and chest/full-body harnesses for children or carrying heavy loads.

=== Lanyards ===
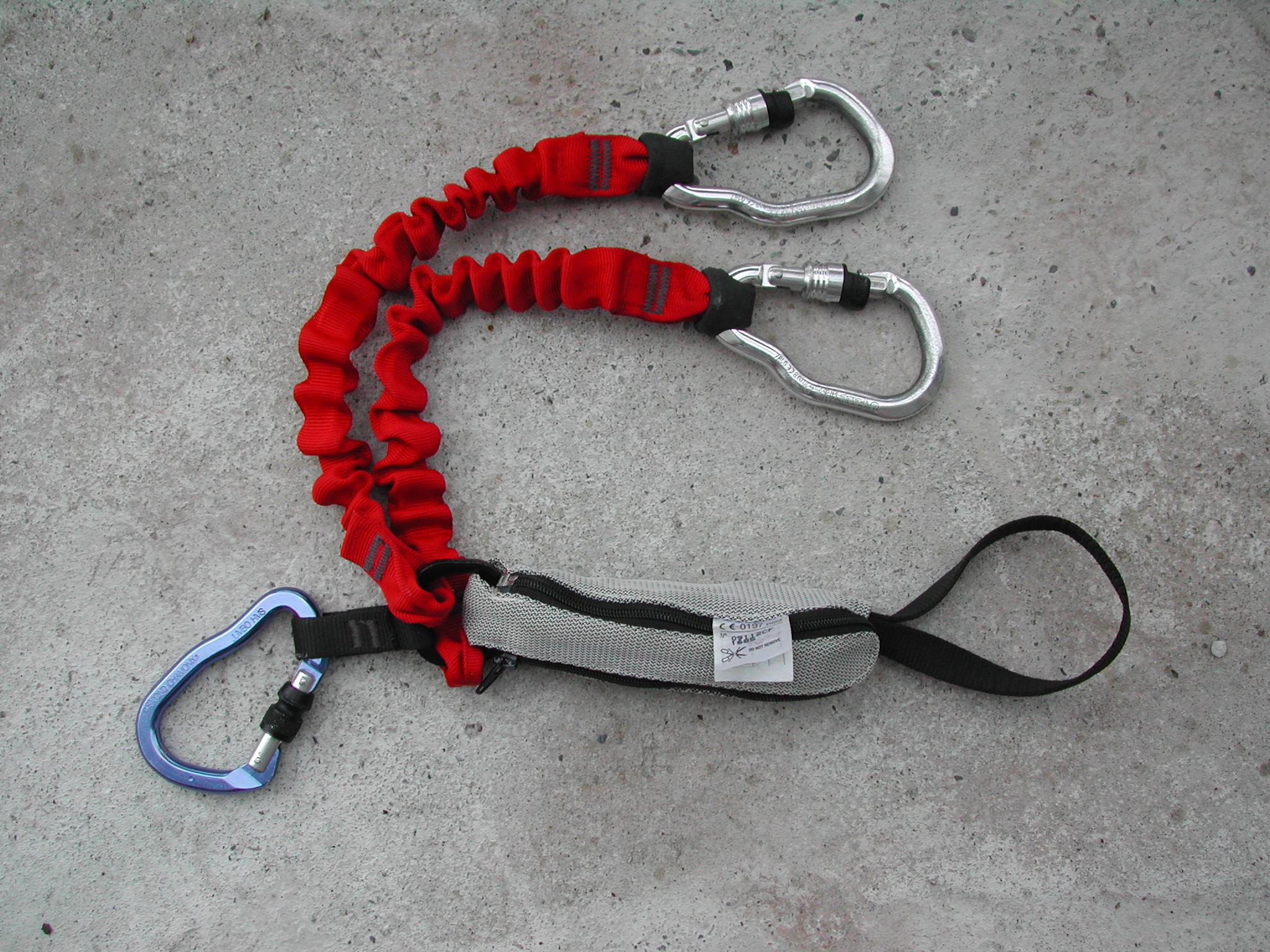
Petzl's "via ferrata lanyard set" with attached "energy absorber"

Lanyards (or "tether", or "via ferrata set") are much longer versions of quickdraws that attach from a harness to a rope (or other anchor points, such as a metal cable). The difference is that lanyards are much stronger than quickdraws and are capable of withstanding fall factors of 2 as found on via ferrata or on multi-pitch climbing routes. They are often made from materials that can absorb dynamic energy and often come with additional optional fall energy absorption devices, and lanyards that have had heavy falls often have to be discarded. Lanyards are also constructed to be sufficiently flexible to resist being twisted.

==== Personal anchor systems ====
A sub-class of lanyards is the personal anchor system (PAS), which is a section of rope or interconnected chains of slings, which are used to tie the harness to an anchor point such as a belay station. Traditionally, climbers would tie their harness to anchors using part of the climbing rope; however, the PAS has become popular as a way to avoid reducing the effective length of the climbing rope, and to use a more straightforward connection.

=== Quickdraws ===
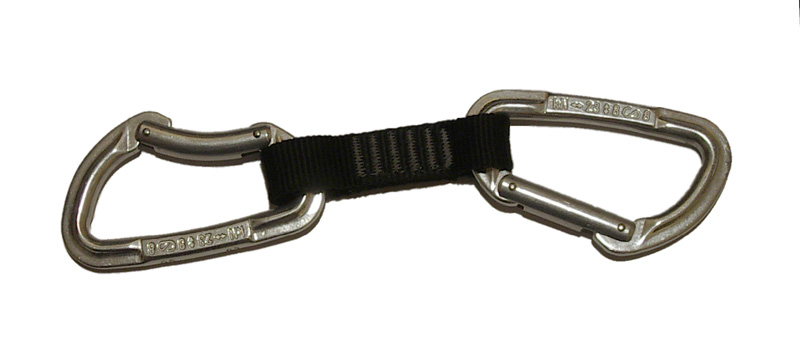
Sport/competition climbing quickdraw with a "bent gate" at one end for easier clipping-in

Quickdraws are used by climbers to connect ropes to fixed points such as bolted anchors in sport climbing, or protection devices in traditional climbing. The quickdraw consists of two non-locking carabiners connected by a short, pre-sewn loop of webbing. They are used to reduce the friction and drag between the rope and the fixed point that can occur when the rope is just clipped into a carabiner clipped into the fixed point. In competition climbing, the quickdraws are already hanging from the pre-fixed bolts, which is called pinkpointing in sport climbing. The quickdraws used in advanced sport and in competition climbing routes often have a "bent gate" on the lower carabiner to make clipping into the quickdraw even easier.

== Rope devices ==
Several devices are used for controlling the rope (e.g. belay devices and self-locking devices), moving up the rope (e.g. ascender devices), or moving down the rope (e.g. rappel/abseil or descender devices). These actions were historically performed by climbers with no mechanical devices (e.g. the body belay for belaying, the dülfersitz abseil for descending, and the prusik knot for ascending), and these mechanical devices help with both control and safety in all conditions (e.g. wet or icy ropes).

=== Ascenders ===
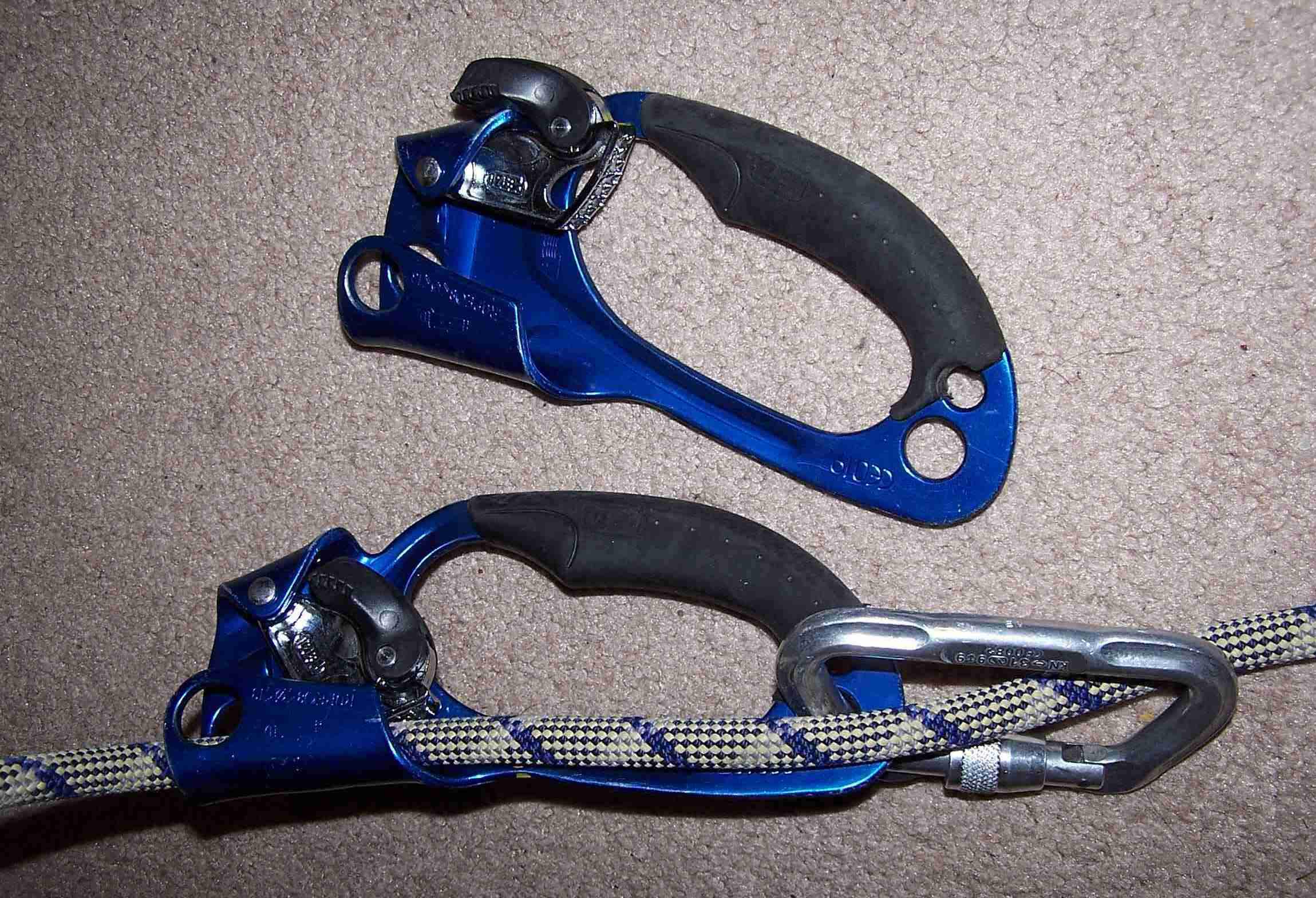
Ascender attached to a rope

Ascenders (also called "jumars" or "crolls" after popular brands) are mechanical devices to enable a climber to move up a fixed rope, which is a static rope that is hanging from a fixed anchor. Ascenders perform the same basic function as friction or prusik knots made from cord but far less effort and concentration are needed to use them (e.g. tired climbers at high-altitude), they can handle much heavier loads (e.g. climbers with ruck-sacks), and they are more reliable in all conditions (e.g. on wet and icy ropes). The ascender uses an internal cam that allows the device to slide freely in one direction but tightly grip the rope when pulled on in the opposite direction. To prevent the ascender device from accidentally falling off the rope, a locking carabiner is also used.

=== Belay devices ===
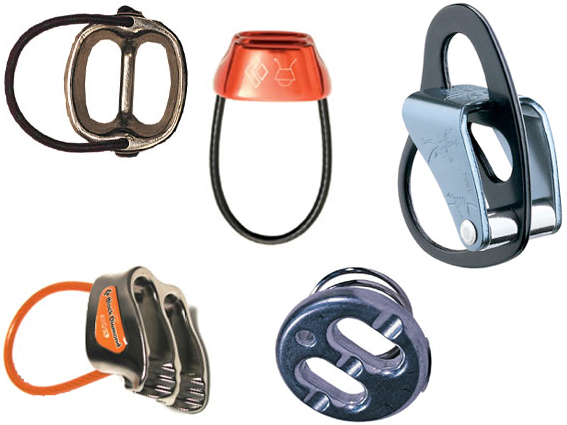
Various models of tubers, and a sticht plate (r-lower)

Belay devices are mechanical friction-brake devices used to control the climbing rope(s) when belaying a climber. Their main purpose is to allow the rope to be locked off or fully braked with minimal effort when arresting a climber's fall. There are many kinds of belay devices, such as the original passive braking devices like "sticht plates" and the later "tubers/tubulars" (e.g. the original Black Diamond ATC, or the Petzl Reverso).

The range of modern belay devices also includes auto-block devices (e.g. the GiGi) allowing the belay device to be attached to a separate anchor point (e.g. and not to the belayer, which is useful for bringing up the second-climber on multi-pitch routes), and active assisted-braking devices (ABDs) that will self-lock with sudden rope movements (e.g. the Petzl GriGri or the Wild Country Revo). Some passive belay devices may also be used as descenders for abseiling.

Indoor climbing walls can provide on-site fixed mechanical auto belay devices that enable the climber to top rope a route alone; more recent lead auto belay models allow the climber to also lead climb the route alone.

=== Descenders ===
Modern descenders

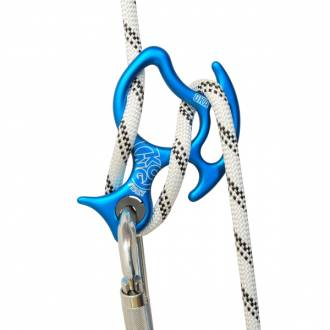
Advanced figure-8

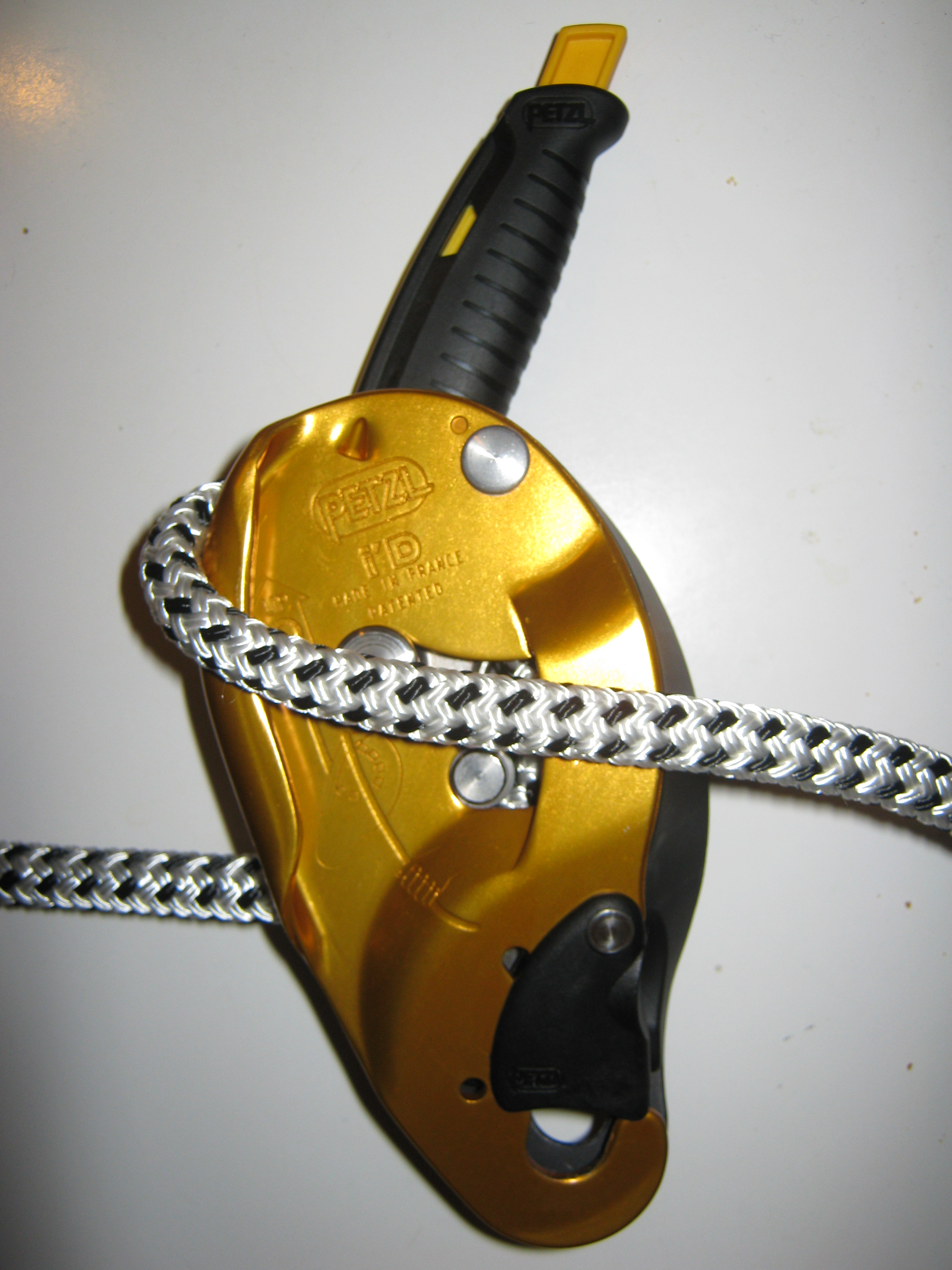
Petzl I'D self-locking

Descenders (or abseil devices) enable a climber to descend a fixed or static rope that is hanging from a fixed anchor. They perform the same basic function as the dülfersitz abseil but with more control and less effort. The classic passive descender, and still widely used, is the figure-eight, although it is offered in more complex variations with "ears" and "wings" to prevent the rope from locking up.

Many passive belay devices can be used as descenders, such as tubers/tubulars. Some modern descenders come with self-locking device (SLD) features that will grip the rope in the event of an uncontrolled fall (e.g. the Petzl I'D S). Heavy-duty descenders such as rappel racks are used for greater control and friction when carrying heavy loads or in very wet or icy conditions (e.g. big wall climbing and caving). The modern technique is to use a descender with a Personal Anchor System.

=== Self-locking devices ===
Self-locking devices

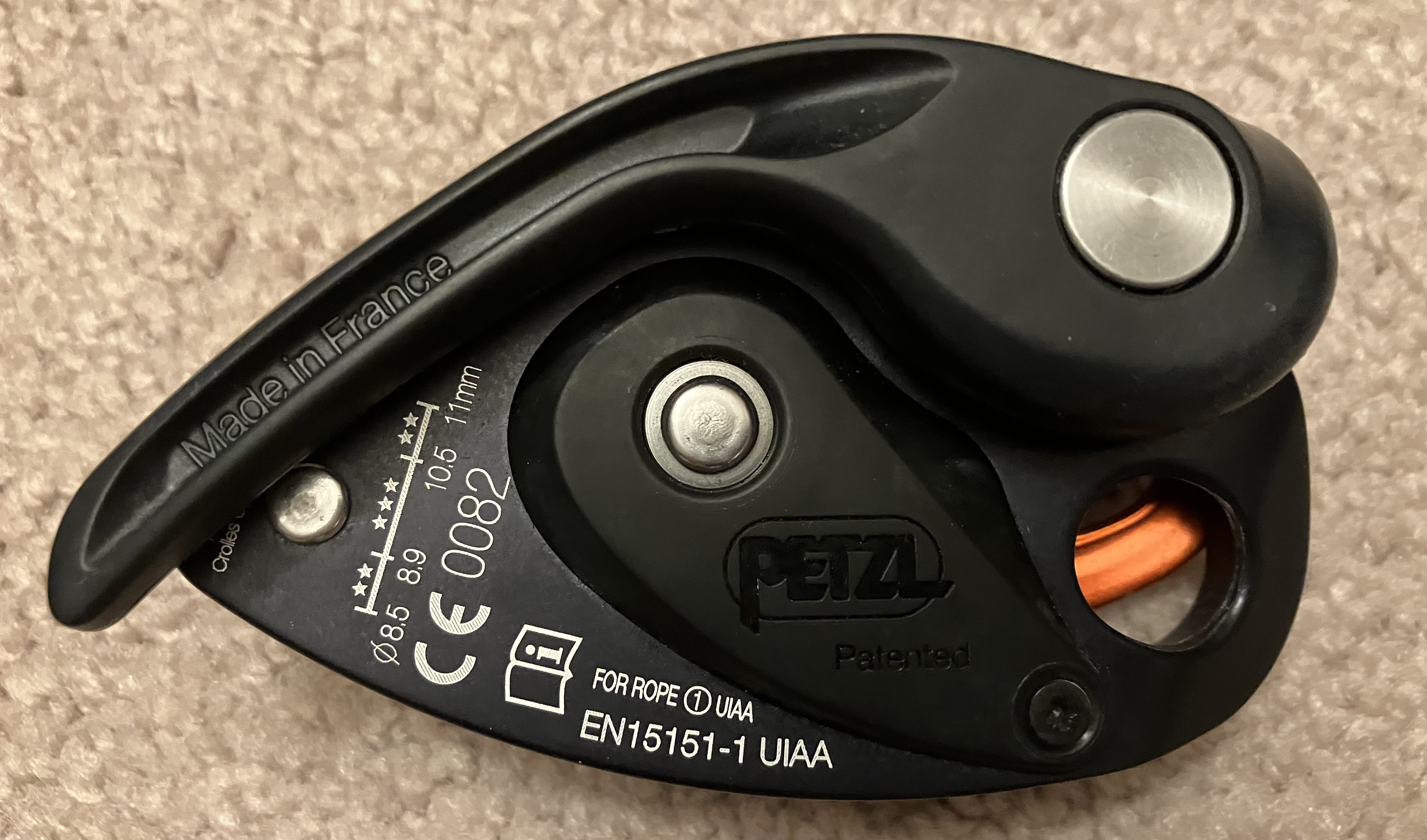
Petzl GriGri

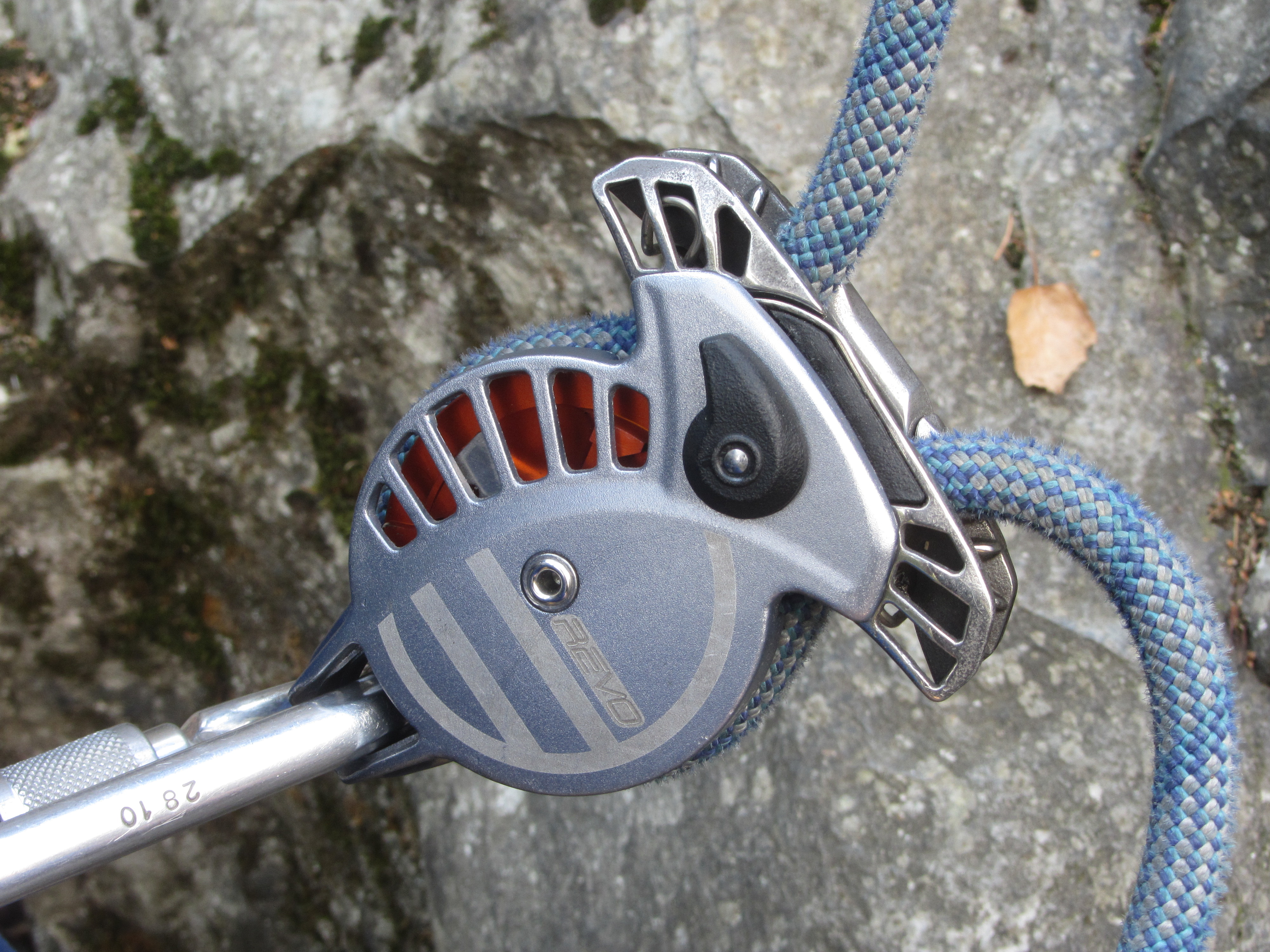
Wild Country Revo

Self-locking devices (SLDs), also called progress capture devices (PCDs), are the terms given to the broader class of rope devices that allow the climbing rope to move more freely in one direction but will lock quickly if the rope tries to move in the opposite direction. Their basic action means that several can also be used as emergency ascenders or assisted-belaying devices (ABDs), but they come in a broad range for a variety of uses (e.g. as a hauling or rescue pulley, like the Petzl Traxion).

The most complex use is for rope solo climbing, for which devices such as Wren's Silent Partner, the Petzel GriGri, and the Wild Country Revo have been used (rope solo climbing requires the widest range of rope devices including ascenders and descenders), or the more straightforward top rope solo climbing, for which the Petzl Micro Traxion and Camp Lift have been used.

== Protection devices ==
As discussed in types of climbing, rock climbing protection devices are mainly used in traditional climbing and in sport climbing, both of which can be done in single and multi-pitch formats. In addition, clean aid climbing also uses many of the traditional climbing protection devices.

=== Temporary ===
Temporary protection devices (also known as pro, gear or the rack), provide the means to place temporary anchor points on the rock to which a lead climber can clip their rope (via a quickdraw) when traditional climbing; they also can be used for anchor points for belaying and abseiling. The devices are categorized as being active (i.e. they dynamically move or adjust in the case of a fall), or passive (i.e., they maintain a static position throughout).

==== Active ====
Active SLCD protection

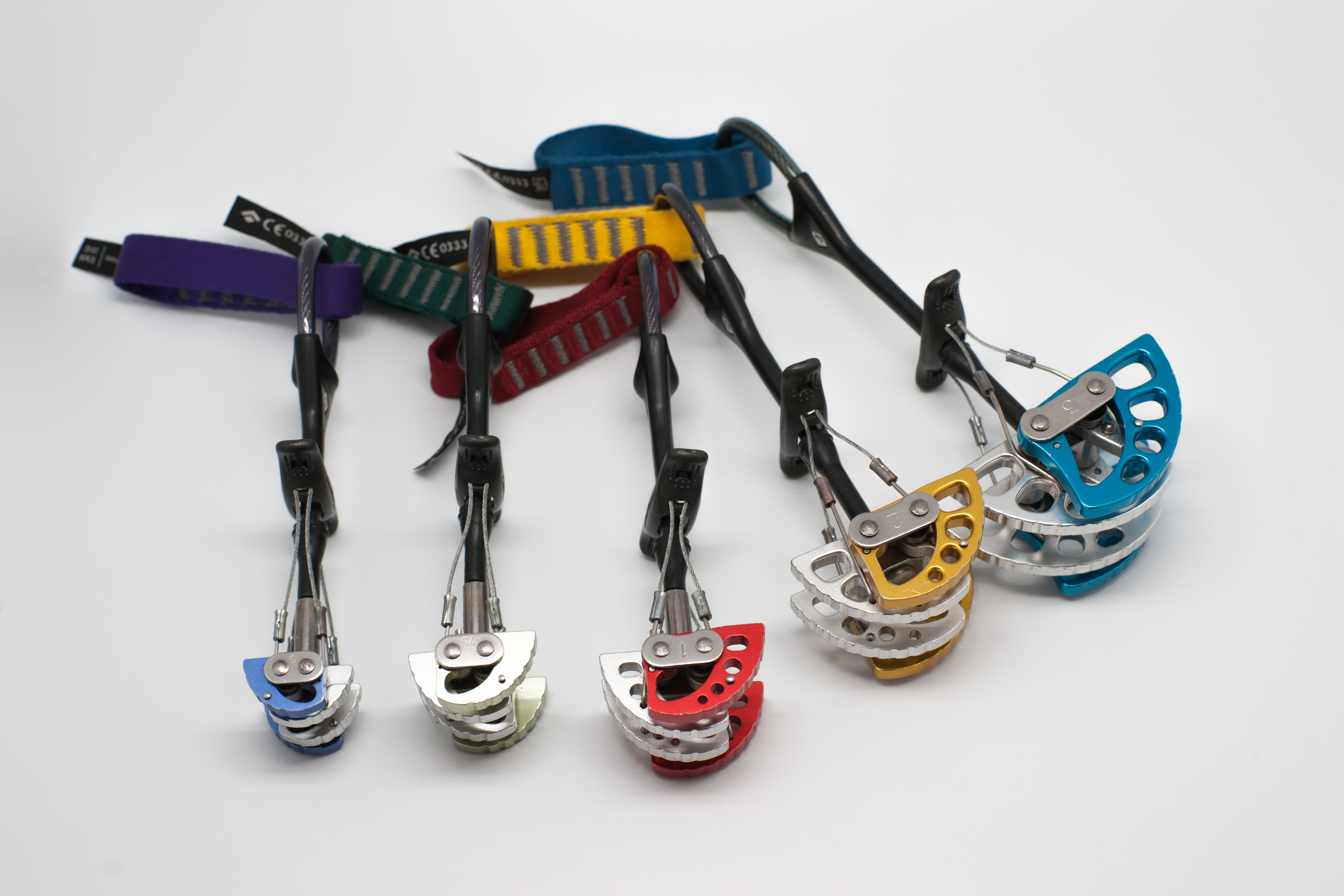
Selection of SLCDs

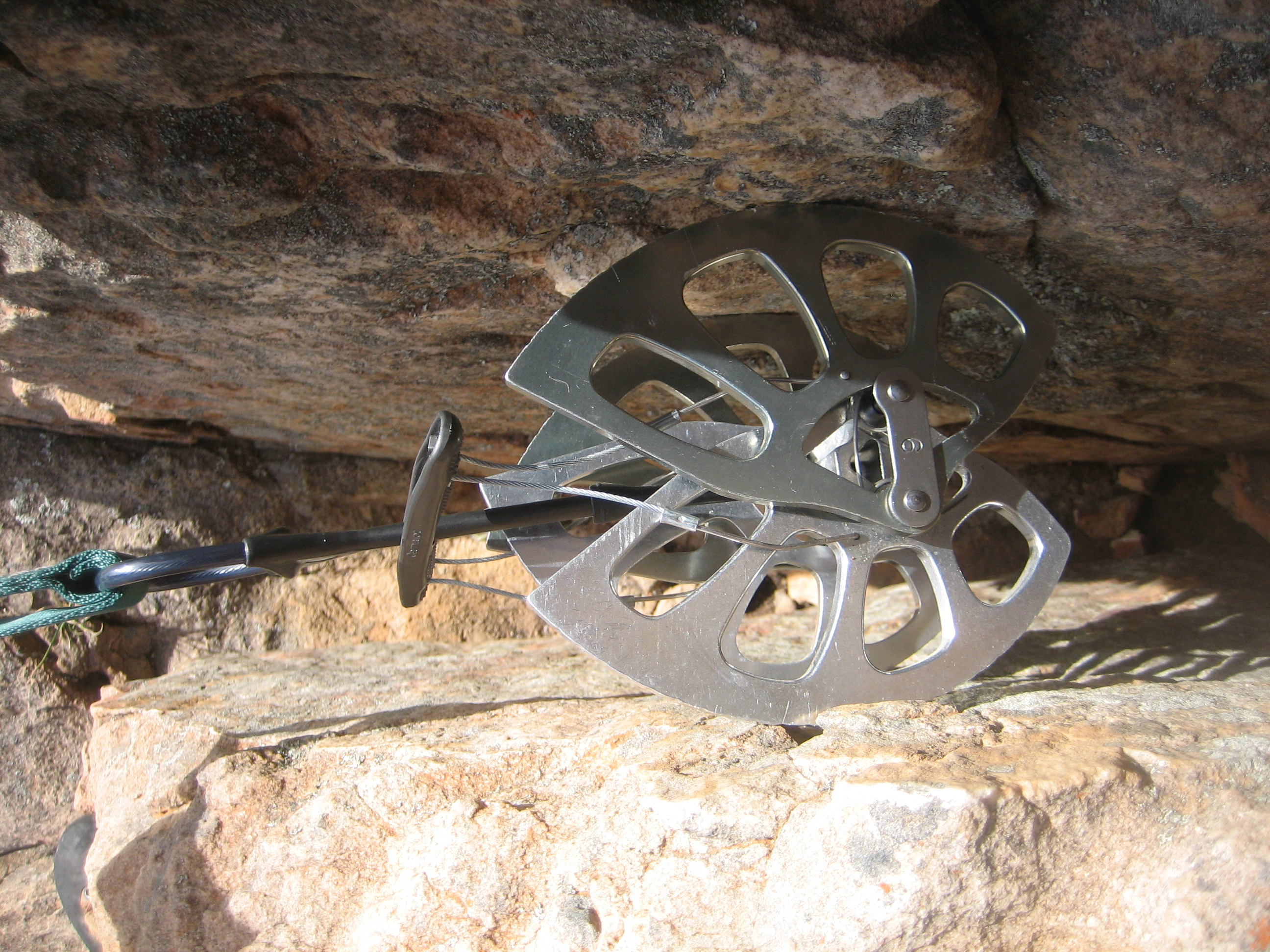
Camalot SLCD in a crack

- Spring-loaded camming devices (SLCDs, or "friends", "camalots") consist of two to four aluminum cams mounted on a spring-loaded axle (or two adjacent axles), in such a way that pulling on the shaft connected to the axle forces the cams to narrow so they can be inserted into small cracks. Once the SLCD is inserted into the crack, its cams will maintain a constant camming angle of 13.75 degrees against the walls of the crack. SLCDs are by far the most popular form of active protection device.
- Big Bros (or tube chocks) are large hollow telescopic aluminum tubes manufactured by Trango whose width can be dynamically adjusted to fit across large off-width cracks that are too wide for standard SLCDs.
- Removable bolts (or RBs) are a type of SLCD for insertion into pre-drilled bolt holes, but instead of using cams, the system uses a metal tube that once inserted expands to grip against the walls of the hole. Less frequently in use, their main application is for climbers creating bolted routes.

==== Passive ====
Passive protection

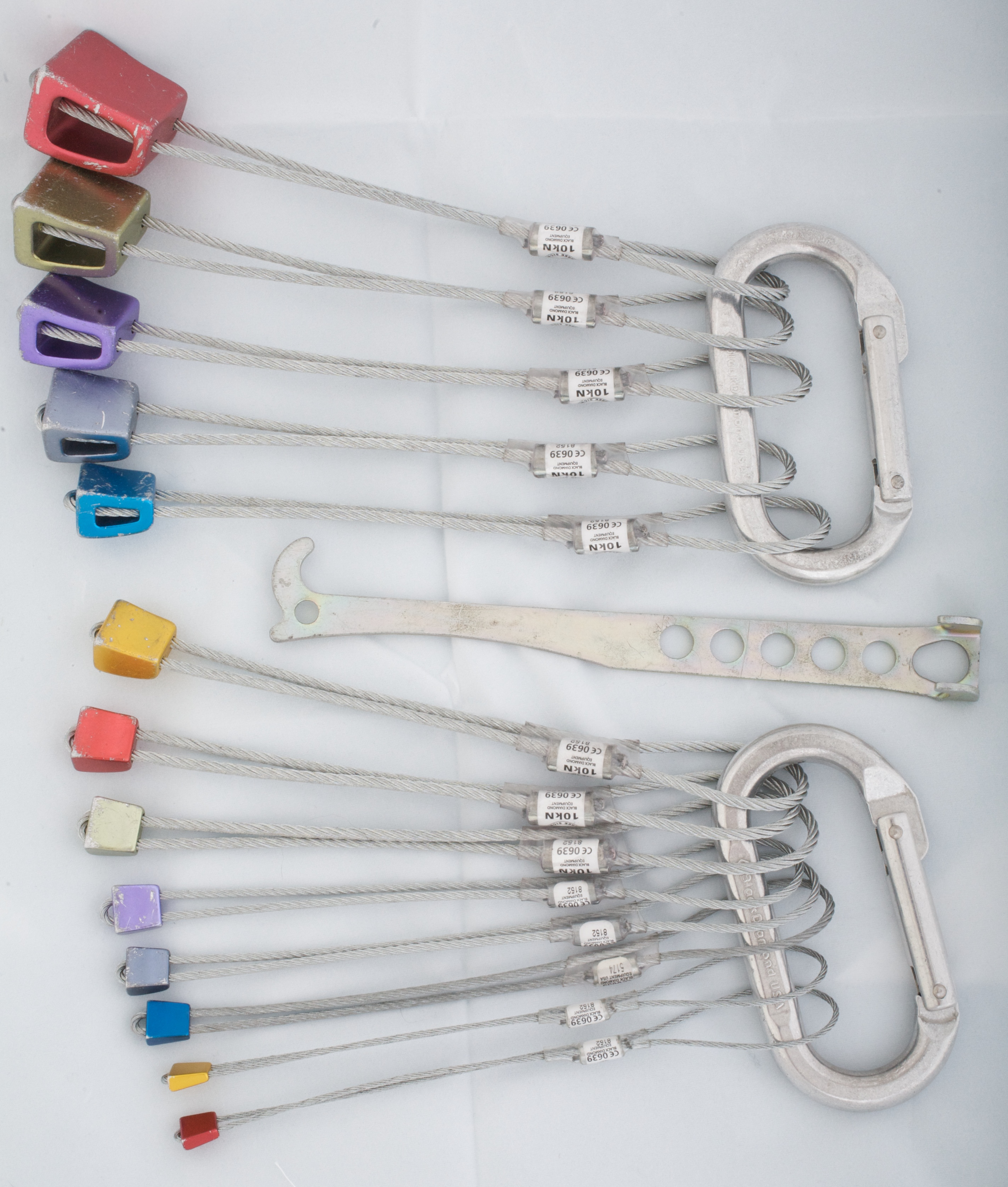
Nuts on a wire

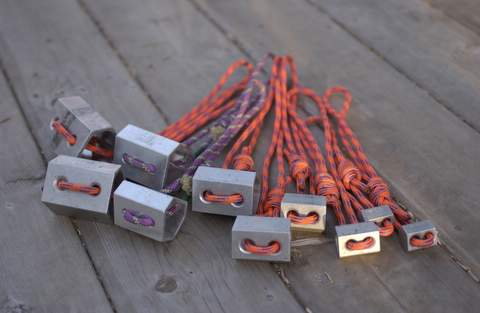
Hexes on loops of cord

- Nuts (also "stoppers", "wires" or "chocks") are the most common form of passive protection, which replaced chockstones with curved blocks of strong aluminum alloy attached to a loop of wire. They are wedged into narrowing/tapering cracks (they do not work well in wide or parallel cracks) and then tugged firmly to set them in place. Nuts come in many varieties (e.g. offset-shaped HB nuts, micro nuts, and brass RP nuts). Where the Australian carrot bolts are common, the wire loop can be used as an emergency substitute for a bolt plate, like a rivet hanger.
- Hexes are hollow asymmetrical hexagonal tubes attached to a loop of cord, particularly for large hexes, or wire. Often wider than nuts, their asymmetrical shape allows their use in parallel and even widening cracks. They are placed like a nut ideally into a narrowing section of the crack and any fall will cause the hex to twist in its placement, thus exerting sideways force on the wall of the crack. Modern climbers tend to use SLCDs over hexes.
- Tricams are shaped aluminum blocks attached to lengths of webbing tape, like with a nut. The block is shaped so that pulling on the tape makes it "cam" against the crack walls, gripping the rock tighter in a similar fashion to a hex. Tricams may also be placed similarly to a nut, relying only on the constriction of a crack. Tricams are not as easy to place or remove as an SLCD but they can fit into narrow cracks and pockets, in some cases being the only type of protection that will work on a particular feature. Tricams are typically cheaper and lighter than SLCDs and are less in use today.

=== Fixed ===
Fixed protection devices are permanent on-site anchors to which a lead climber can clip their rope – often via a quickdraw – when they are sport climbing; they also can be used to create anchor points for belaying and abseiling. The main types are:

Fixed protection

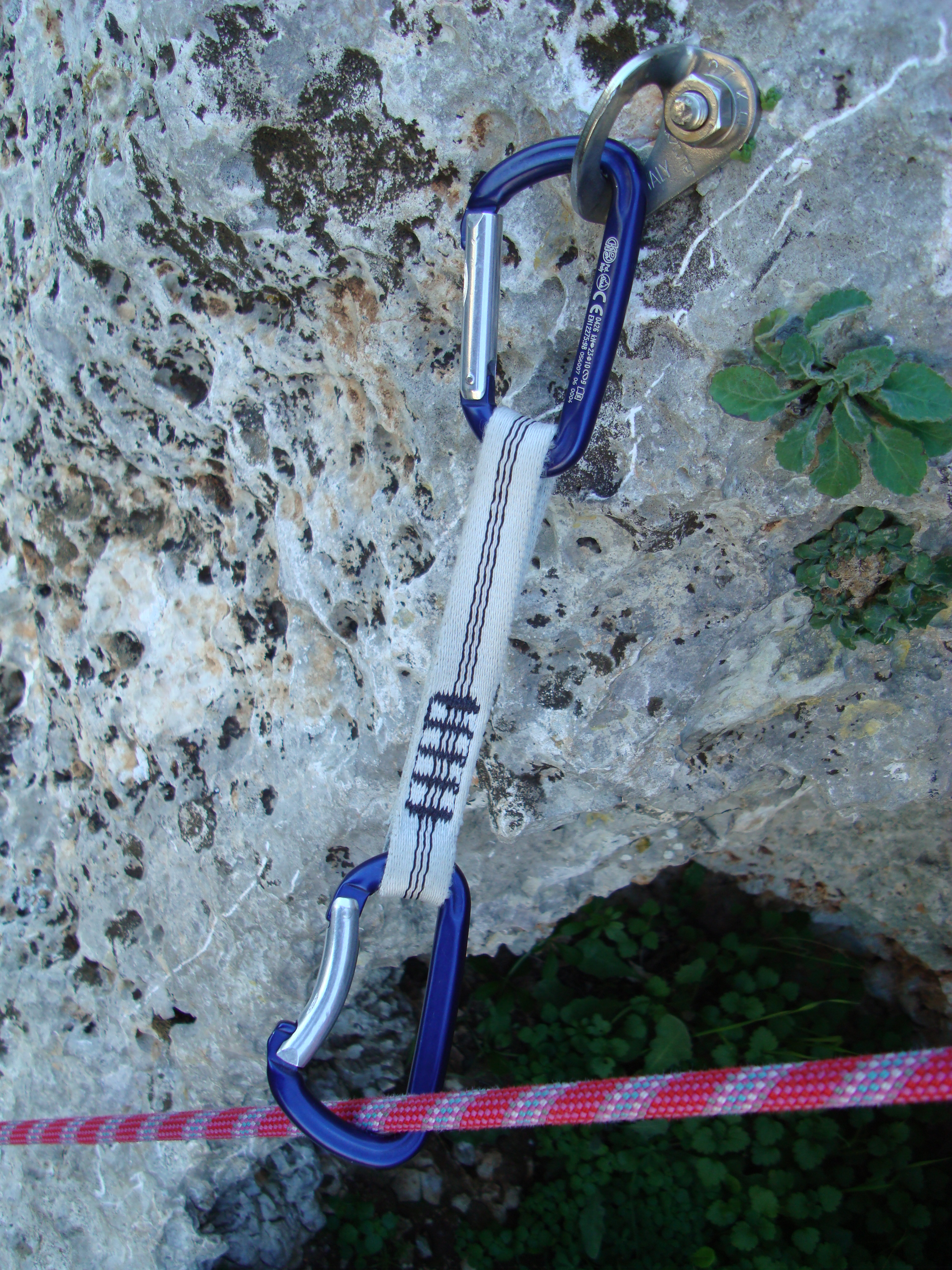
Bolt with quickdraw

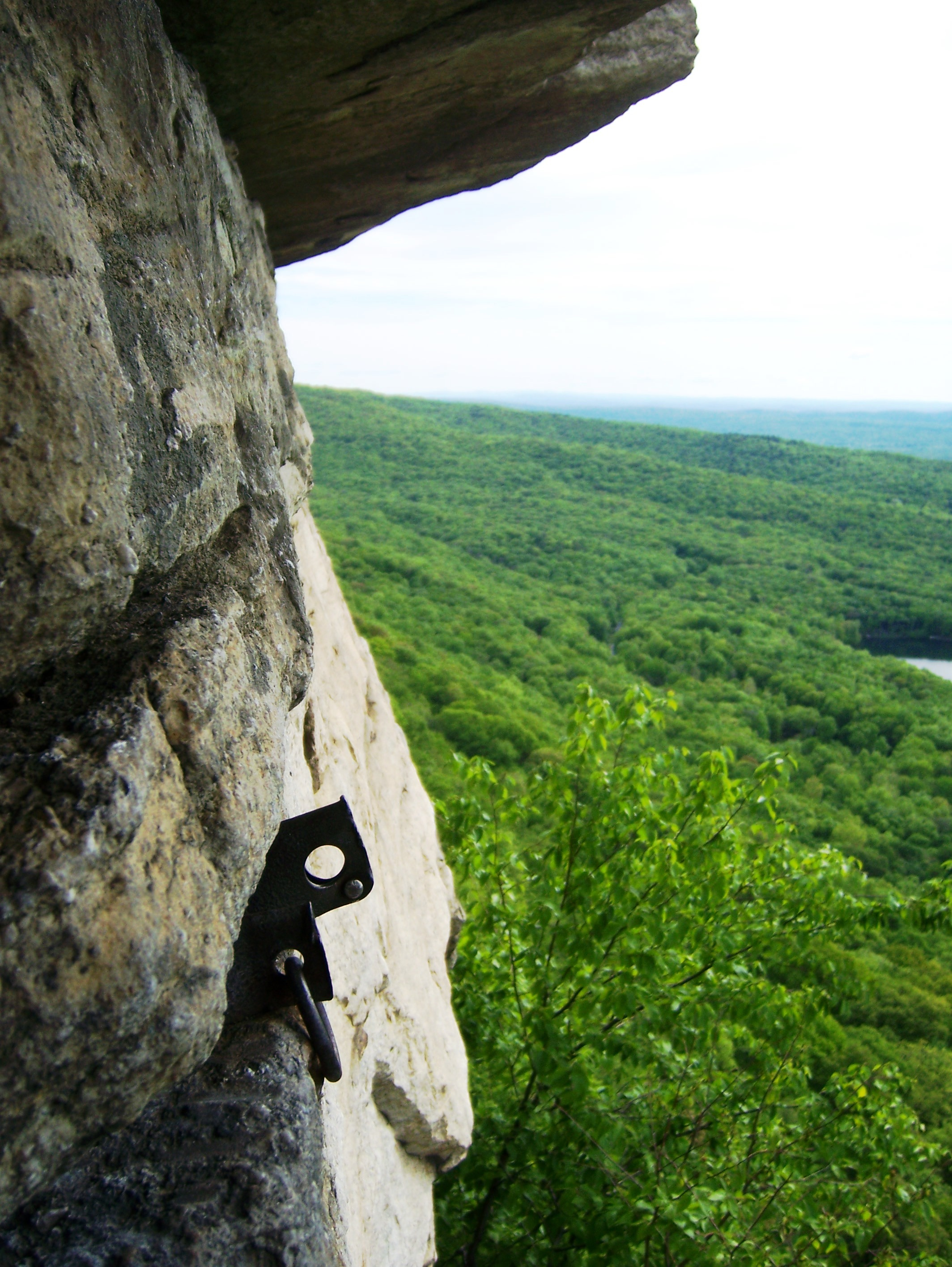
Piton with metal ring

- Bolts are steel or expansion bolts are pre-drilled into the rock with a hand drill and tightened with a torque wrench. Other types versions use a type of glue to anchor the bolt. A bolt hanger is attached into which carabiners and quickdraws can be clipped. Modern stainless steel bolts last for over a decade but have a finite life span after which they must be replaced. Titanium bolts may be used for even greater durability, or in harsher environments like sea-side cliffs, but these are more expensive. Some bolted crags use fixed permadraws, which are on-site wire or chain quickdraws that are permanently attached to the bolt hangers.
- Pitons pre-date bolts and are steel spikes – the older versions were made from iron – that could be hammered into cracks in the rock and that have an eye-hole for attaching a carabiner (some would have pre-installed metal rings). Unlike bolts, pitons need a crack into which they can be hammered, and come in a wide variety of shapes and designs (e.g. angles, knifeblades, lost arrows) to fit various cracks, and even micro-cracks like RURPs. Pitons have been largely replaced by the stronger bolts as the fixed protection of choice but are still an important part of big wall climbing, alpine and aid climbing (but not clean aid climbing, which rules out any use of hammers).

== Aid equipment ==
Aid climbing uses several of the above devices but in a way that gives "aid" to the climber in ascending (e.g. pulling up on pitons and hooks). There are also a number of other pieces of equipment that are more exclusively associated with aid climbing.

Aid climbing equipment

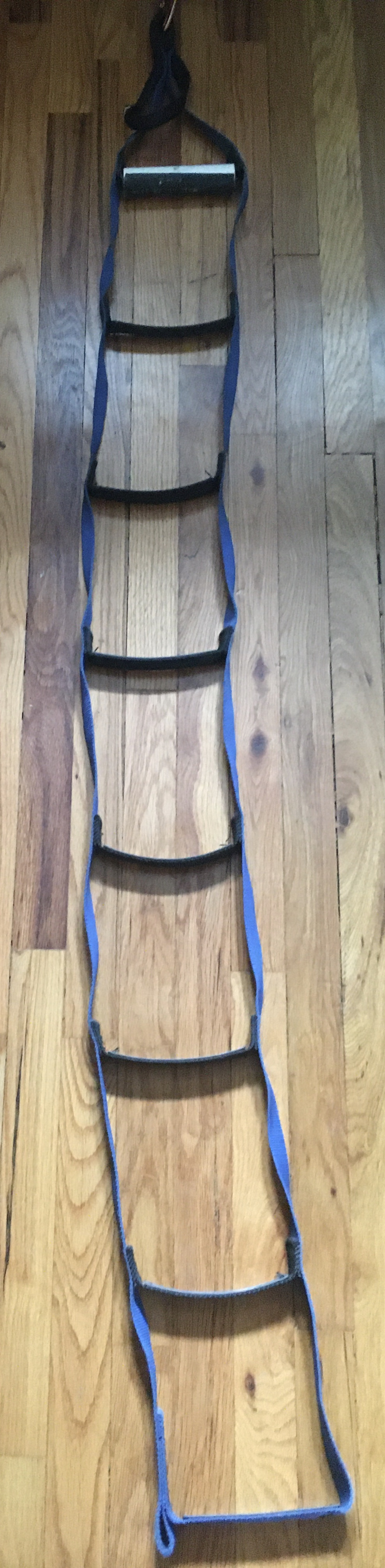
Aider

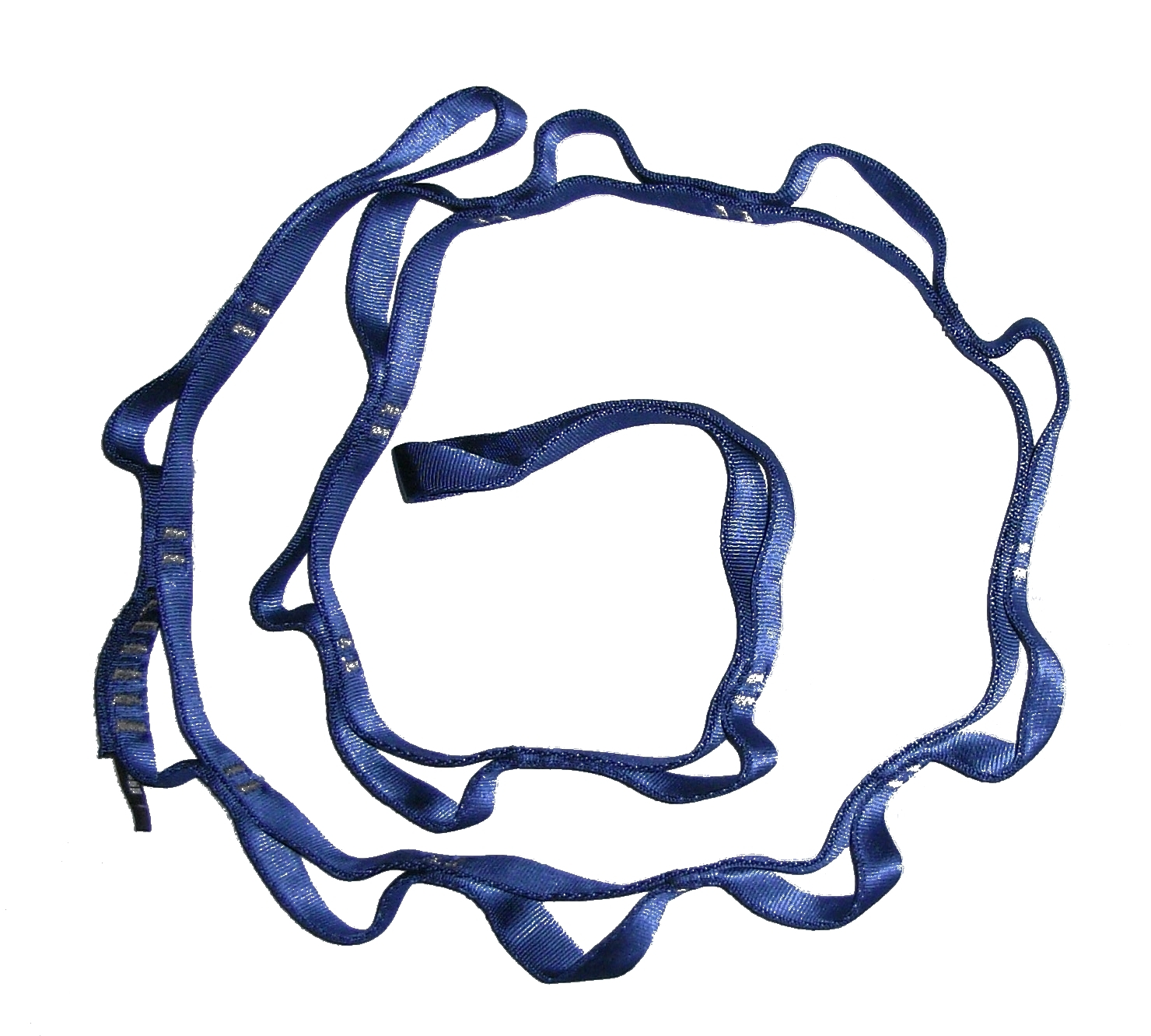
Daisy chain

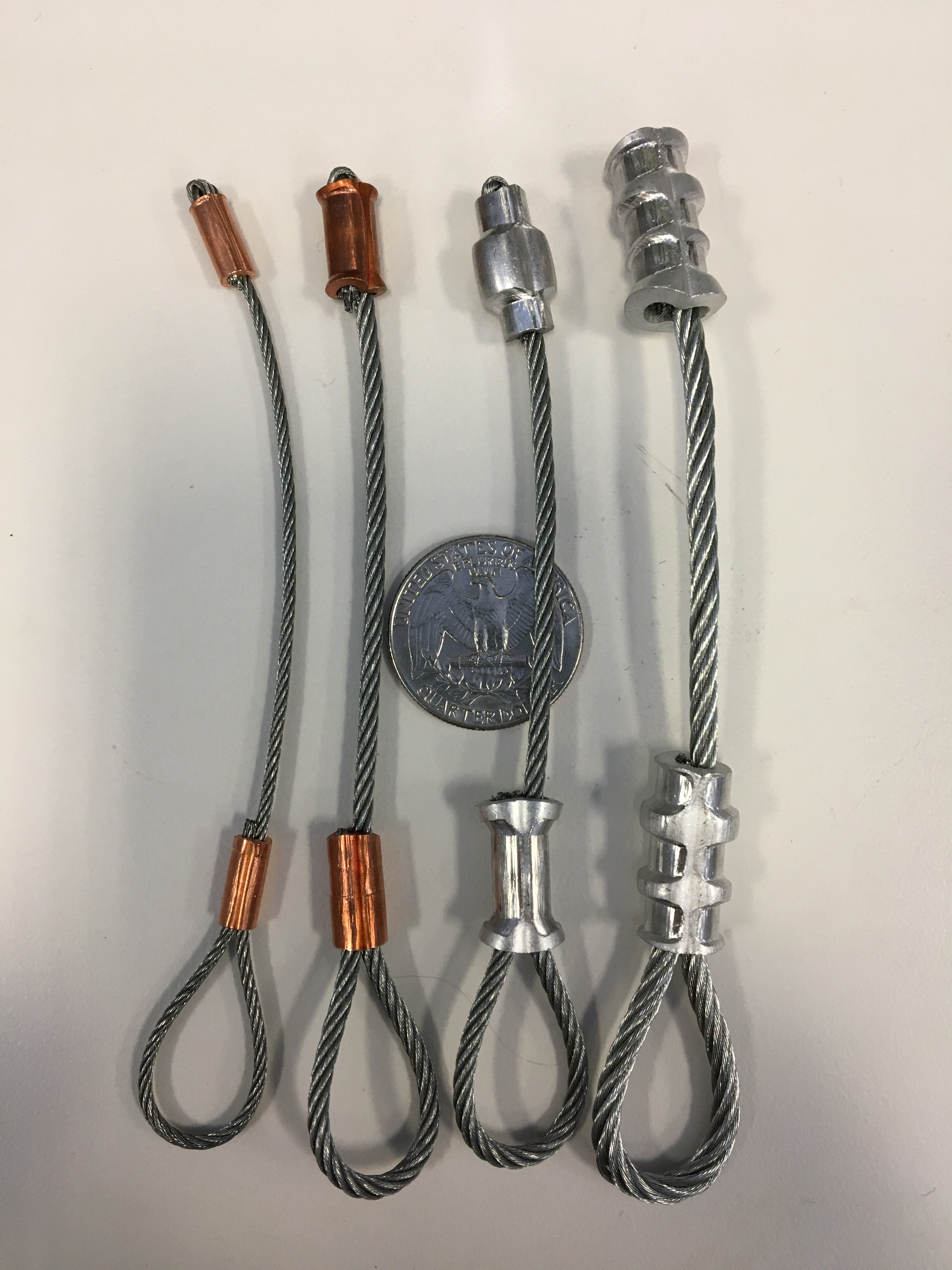
Copperhead

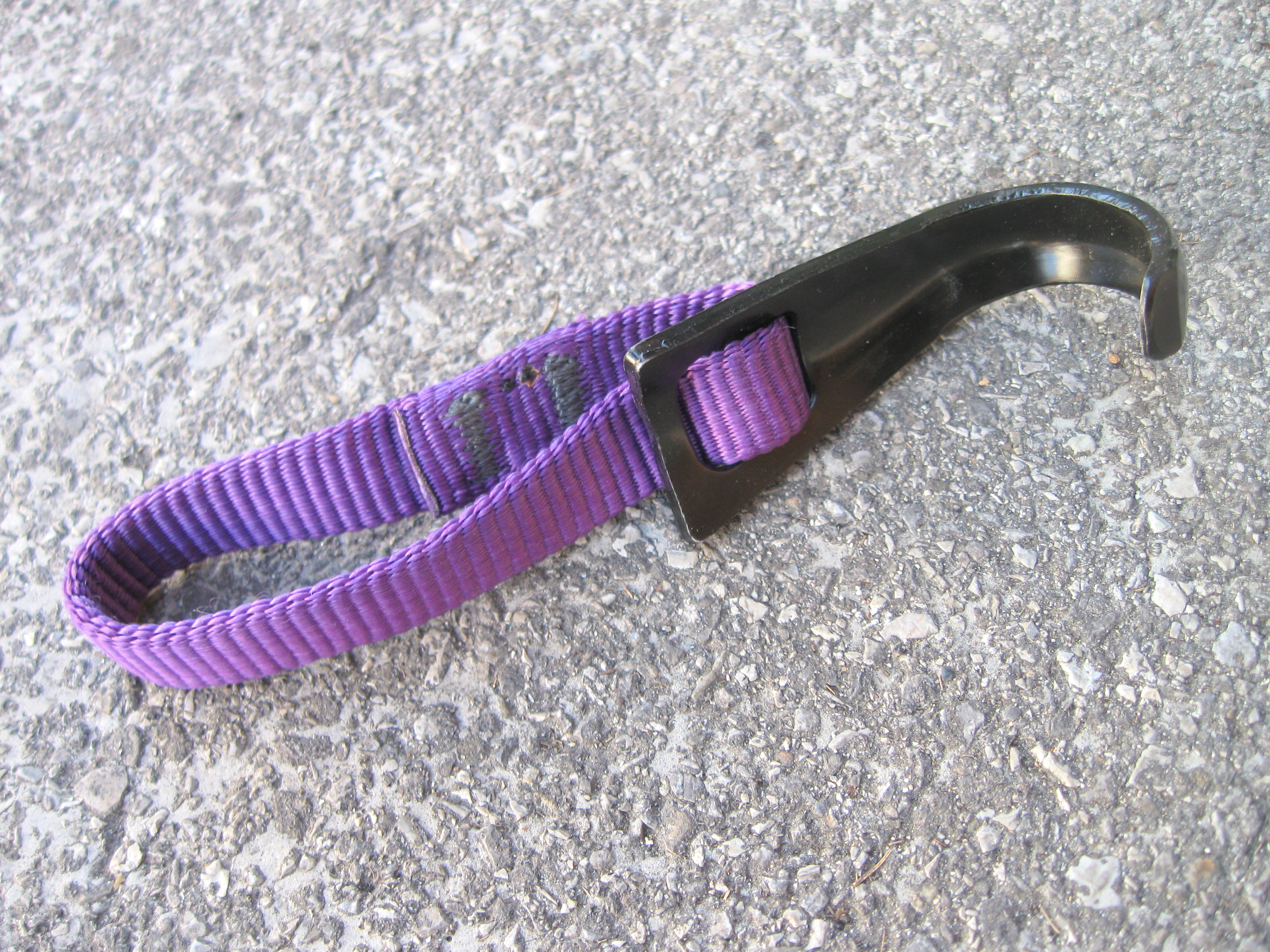
Skyhook

- Aiders (or the French etriers) are short 5–6 rung ladders made of lightweight webbing and are a central part of the technique of aid climbing. They are normally used in pairs where the aid climber stands on one aider while clipping in the higher aider. Aiders can also come as "offset style" aiders, which are 5–6 stirrup-loops arranged on either side of a central rope, and as lightweight "adjustable style" aiders so the climber can create customized rung sizes.
- Daisy chains are 1-to-1.5-metre (3 to 5 ft) long webbing slings that have multiple small loops for carabiner attachment, which are made by stitching the sling at 8-to-15-centimetre (3 to 6 in) intervals. Like aiders, daisy chains are also a central part of aid climbing. They are used to attach the harness to the aider. Care has to be taken not to clip into the loops incorrectly, which can cause the daisy chain to fail and rip apart (e.g. when trying to use it as a Personal Anchor System).
- Copperheads (or "bashie") are a type of soft-metal nut, usually made from copper, which can be hammered into very thin cracks that are too small for even the narrowest piton. Copperheads are only used in aid climbing but their low strength means that they can only handle the "static bodyweight" of an ascending aid climber and will likely fail if the climber makes a dynamic fall. At times, climbers will "clean out" build-ups of copperheads on an aid climbing route.
- Hooks are steel hooks of various shapes (e.g. bat hook, talon hook, grappling hook, etc.,) that are hung from cracks and flakes (e.g. the fifi hook and skyhook). They are mostly used in aid climbing but have been used in extreme traditional climbing routes as a last resort where the hook placement may not withstand a dynamic fall. A particular type of hook is a rivet hanger that can be attached to old metal rivets–an example being Australian carrot bolts–permanently fastened into the rock face.
- Rock climbing hammers are a type of hammer made to insert various types of pitons while ascending routes; clean aid climbing does not allow the use of hammers because all clean aid equipment must only be inserted on a temporary basis.

== Clothing equipment ==
Rock climbers use several pieces of specialized clothing equipment including:

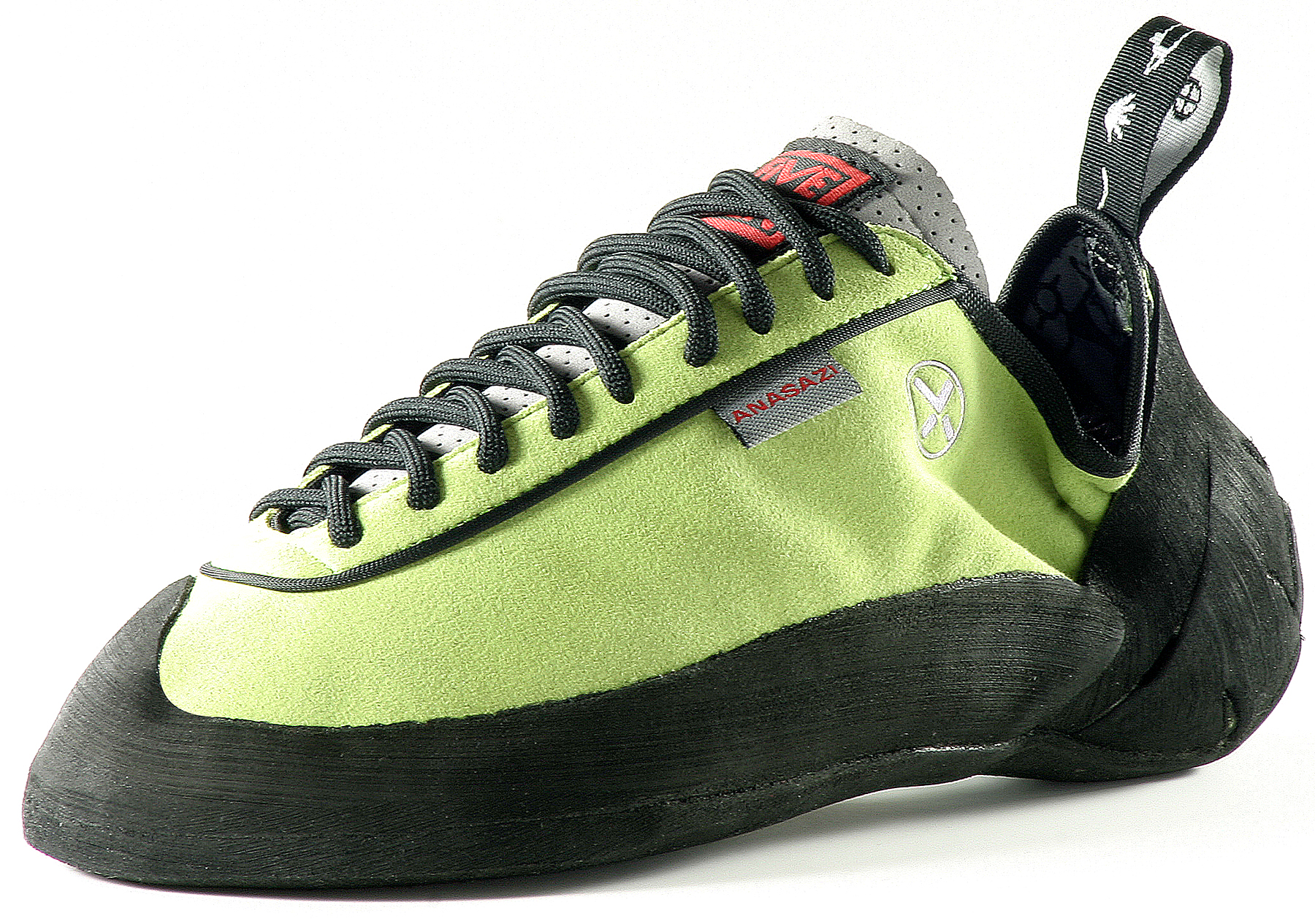
A modern rock climbing shoe

- Belay glasses allow the belayer to look up at the lead climber without having to strain their neck upwards (i.e. the glasses are tilted upwards by 45 degrees), and are used when there is extensive belaying such as on long routes, or by climbing instructors.
- Belay gloves are used to protect the hands and are commonly needed on big wall climbing routes. Their construction from leather or other hard-wearing materials generally improves grip on the rope, which lessens the risk of a failure of the belay system.
- Climbing shoes are designed to increase the friction, and thus the grip, between the foot and the climbing surface with a vulcanized rubber sole. Stiffer shoes are used for "edging" and softer soles for "smearing".
- Climbing helmets protect the skull against falling debris such as rocks in alpine climbing or dropped pieces of equipment, as well as the impact forces on the head during a fall while climbing, particularly when the falling lead climber is flipped over.

== Miscellaneous equipment ==
Rock climbers may also use a range of other specialized equipment including:

- Bouldering mats are used to protect boulder climbers from the frequent falls that happen in bouldering, which while shorter than other types of climbing, can be onto uneven or hard surfaces from awkward body positions, leading to injury.
- Climbing chalk is widely used by rock climbers to help absorb moisture on their hands; the chalk is kept in a "chalk bag" that is hung around the waist area. US boulderer John Gill is largely credited with introducing "gymnastic chalk" to climbing in the 1950s (he was a gymnast himself).
- Gear slings are loops of webbing (often with some padding) worn diagonally across the chest on longer traditional climbing routes (e.g. multi-pitch climbing) when the climber cannot comfortably arrange their protection equipment on the gear loops of their harnesses.
- Guidebooks are hard-wearing books (i.e. they will be taken on the climb) outlining the key details of the climbing routes including diagram (or topos) of the routes and the grades of difficulty of each individual pitch.
- Haul bags are large tubular bags of hardwearing construction (so they can be dragged over rock) into which supplies and climbing equipment can be carried on long multi-pitch routes; commonly used in big wall climbing that calls them "pigs" due to the effort of hauling them up on pulleys.
- Knee pads are neoprene pads that are worn on the lower thigh to protect a climber when performing a knee bar; knee pads are credited with improving climbing standards and climbing grades and their use has become accepted in free climbing.
- Medical tape ("tape" can also refer to webbing) is used by climbers to prevent and repair skin injuries. For example, tape lessens skin damage while hand jamming on rough granite surfaces; it is also used to cover skin that has been worn down on the fingers, while crack climbing.
- Nut tool (or "nut key") is a metal tool used to help retrieve nuts and hexes that have become firmly wedged into cracks.
- Portaledges are used in big wall climbing as a temporary overnight sleeping platform; they are also used as a resting platform for long belays, which are typical on big wall aid climbing routes.
- Pulleys are used by big wall climbers to help bring up haul bags and other pieces of equipment.
- Stick clips (or "clip sticks") are long poles with a quickdraw at one end which can be clipped into the first bolt of a sport climbing route by a climber standing on the ground; avoids the risk of a ground-fall before clipping into the first piece of protection.
- Wire brushes are used to clean holds, particularly at the higher graded climbing routes where the holds are very small and need to be dry and free of any debris or vegetation to be usable; toothbrushes may be used to clean the smallest holds without damaging them.
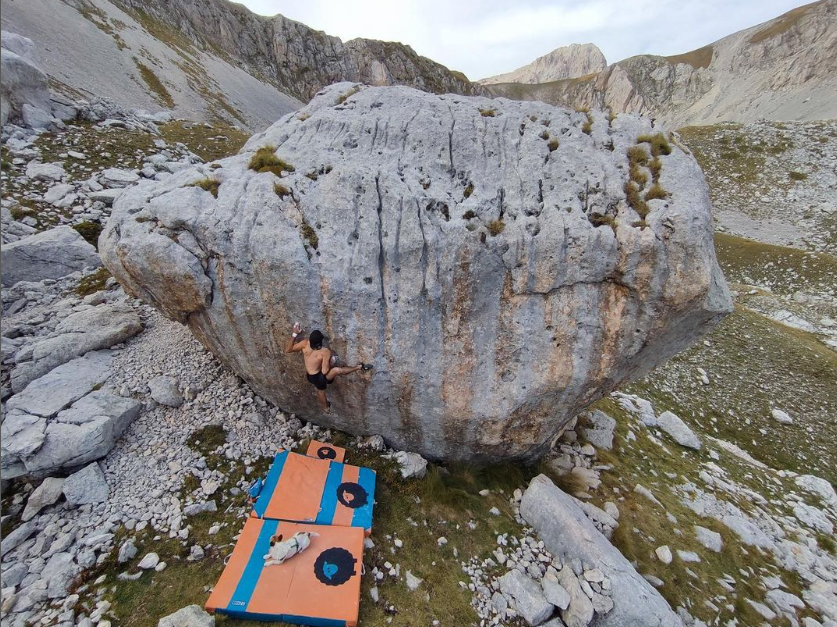
Climber using a bouldering mat

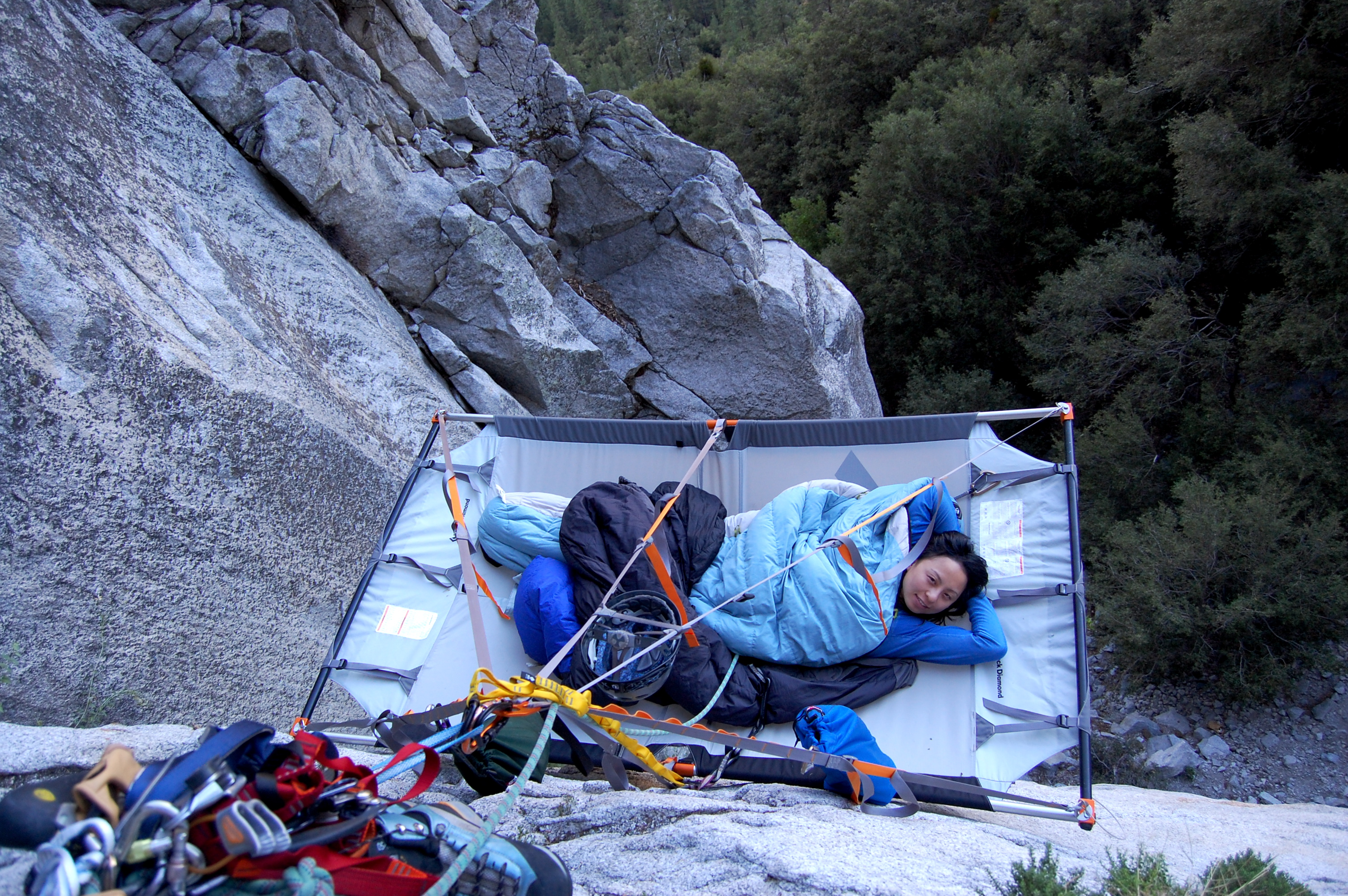
Climber lying on a portaledge

== Training equipment ==
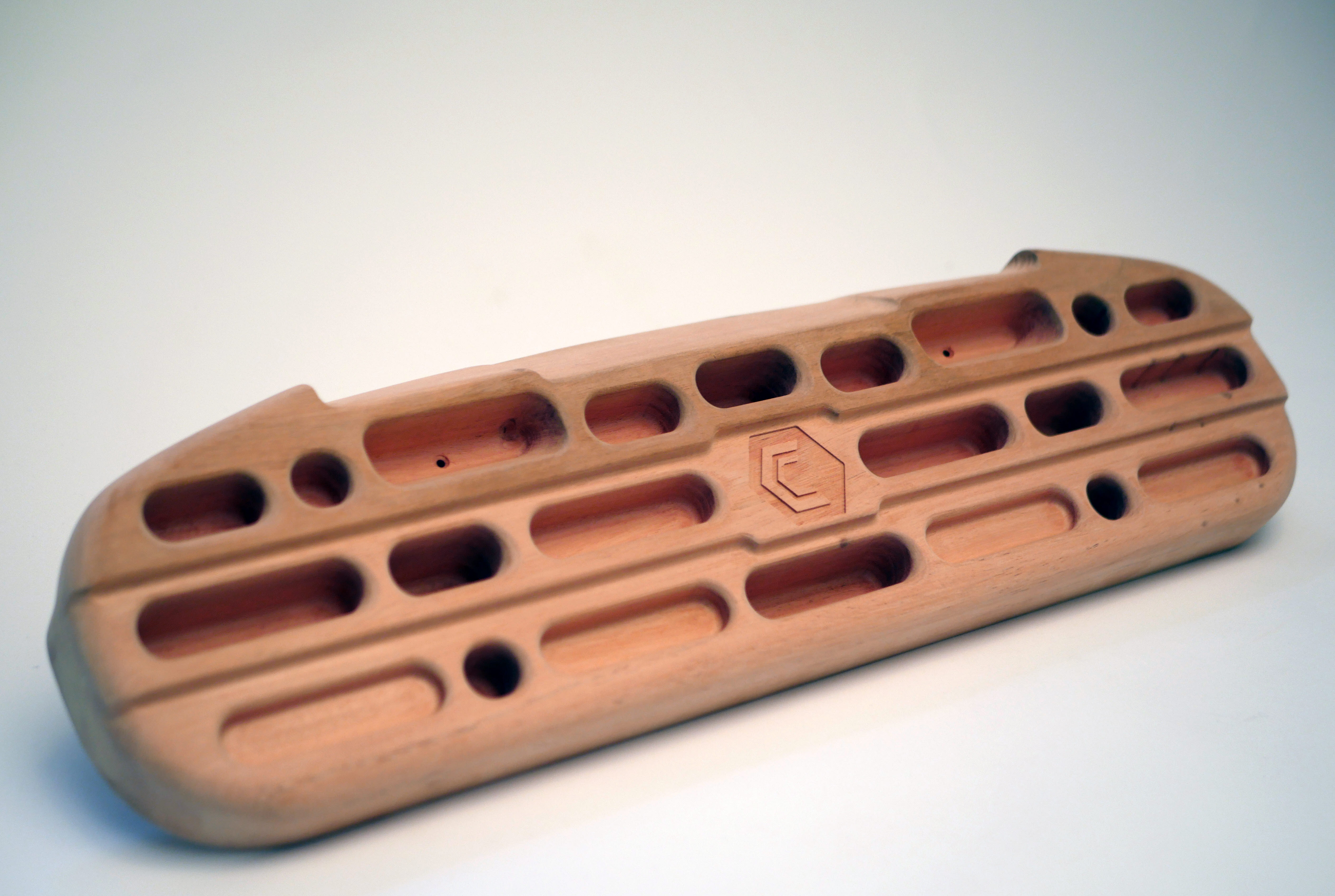
A hangboard

Various items of equipment are employed during climbing-specific training to strengthen the climber's fingers, tendons, and muscles:

- Bachar ladder is a narrow and flexible ladder, typically capable of being rolled up, made from metal, PVC, or webbing that is hung horizontally between two points – usually with one point higher to create a slope – that the climber ascends and descends the rungs using only their arm strength with no use is made of their feet; it is an early version of a campus board but that focused on arm strength and not hand/finger strength.
- Campus board is a series of horizontal rungs attached to an overhanging surface that is typically climbed up and down without the aid of the feet. When used properly, campus boards improve finger strength and also dynamic or plyometric, muscle strength.
- Grip saver – small device that can help in developing the antagonist muscles to those used while gripping with the hand. Use of such a device can prevent the ligament injuries that are experienced by climbers.
- Hangboard (or "fingerboard") – is related to the campus board and was developed to focus on building static arm and finger strength; it is a popular training tool for rock climbers and comes in many forms and materials.
- Kilter Board – An adjustable angle, app-controlled, fixed-layout climbing wall system with light up holds. Kilter Boards offer multiple sizes and layouts with a database of over 170k problems made by users all over the world. Because of the angle and hold variety, the Kilter Board was designed to be usable for climbers of all abilities.
- MoonBoard – A rectangular section of climbing wall, typically overhanging at 40 degrees, onto which climbing holds have been fixed in a dense grid-like fashion; modern MoonBoards have almost 200 holds from which over 55,000 graded boulder problems have been created.

== See also ==
=== Manufacturers ===
- List of climbing and mountaineering equipment brands

=== Types ===
- Alpine climbing equipment
- Caving equipment
- Ice climbing equipment
- Mixed climbing equipment
