= Reverso =

Reverso may refer to:

- Reverso (language tools), a website specializing in online translation aids and language services
- Reverso (climbing equipment), a belay device used in rock-climbing produced by Petzl
- Reverso (watch), a model of wristwatch produced by Jaeger-LeCoultre
- Reverso poem, a poem whose lines can be read backwards and forwards
