= Belay glasses =

Special eyeglasses for rock climbing

Belay glasses are eyeglasses with prismatic lenses that are used by belayers in rock climbing to avoid the neck strain associated with belaying.

== History ==
The first belay glasses were invented in 2007 by climber Albi Schneider from Germany.

== Principle ==
Principle of operation of belay glasses. Light from above is reflected into the observer's eye.

Belaying involves a person standing on a stable platform below a rock climber controlling the tension and friction of the climber's rope. Since this activity requires craning one's neck to look up at the climber, a common malady named "belayer's neck" can occur. The prismatic lenses of the belay glasses are arranged so as to bend light from above through total internal reflection into the observer's eye, allowing the belayer to observe the climber while maintaining a comfortable head/neck position.

The design based on the eyeglasses frame provides for a split field of vision:

- The central field through the lenses, providing a vertical view to the climber
- The peripheral field around the sides of the lenses, allowing the belayer to remain aware of their surroundings

== Alternative uses ==
Different types of prism glasses may also be suitable for other sports.

In cycling, belay glasses have been used by record-breaking cyclist Marc Beaumont to maintain a more aerodynamic sitting position. In time trial cycling in particular, there has been controversy surrounding sitting positions that are so uncomfortable that cyclists are unable to see ahead. In the 2023 European Time Trial Championships, debate arose after Swiss Stefan Küng rode straight into a barrier, and himself stated that he could only see 5 meters in front of him while riding. A 2023 feasibility study considered optics similar to belay glasses to improve safety in time trial cycling.

In snooker, prism glasses are not used, but some players use special glasses with a higher optical center, extra-tall lenses, and a special angle (pantoscopic tilt) so that they are perpendicular to the line of sight when bent forward.

== Gallery ==
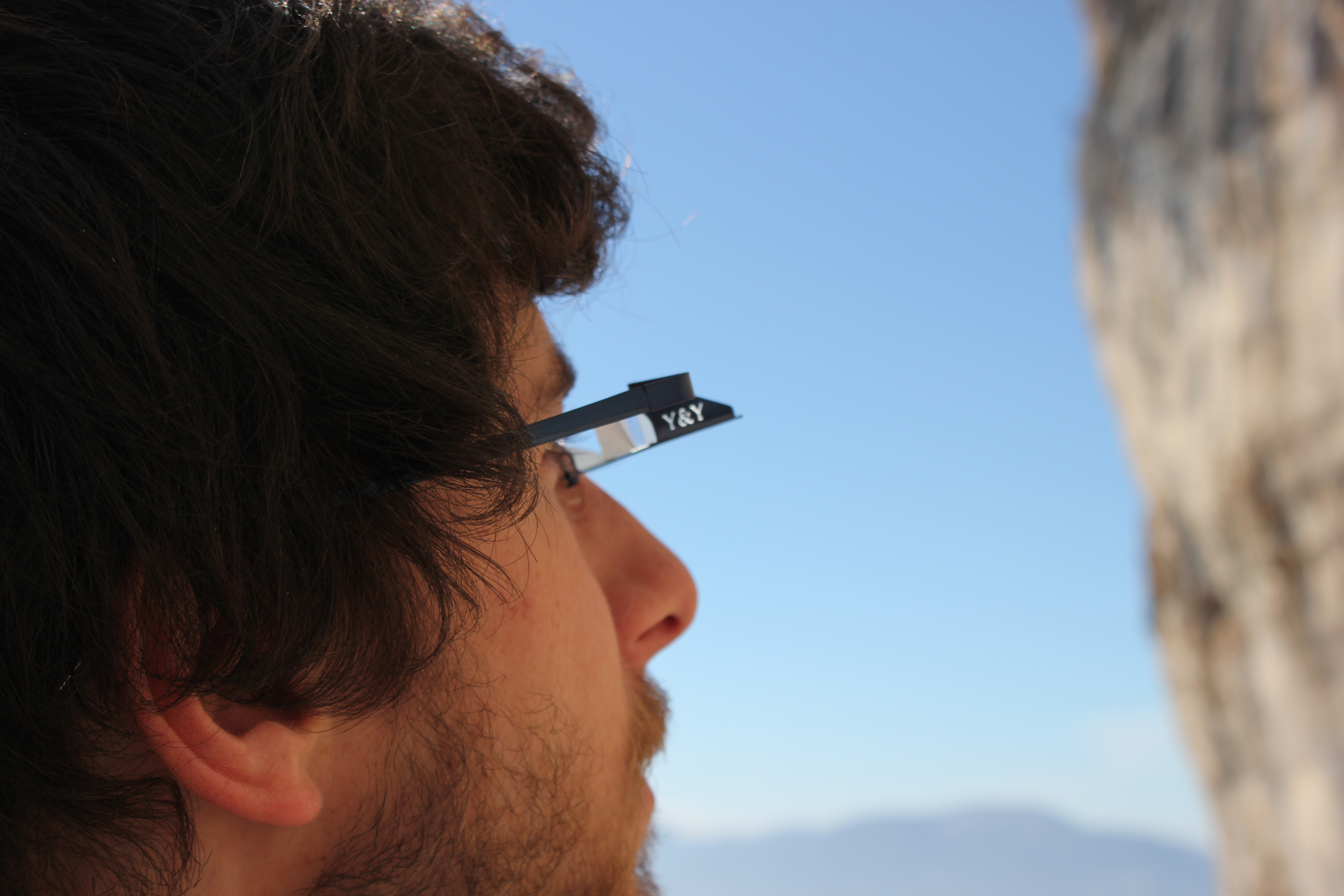
Belay glasses

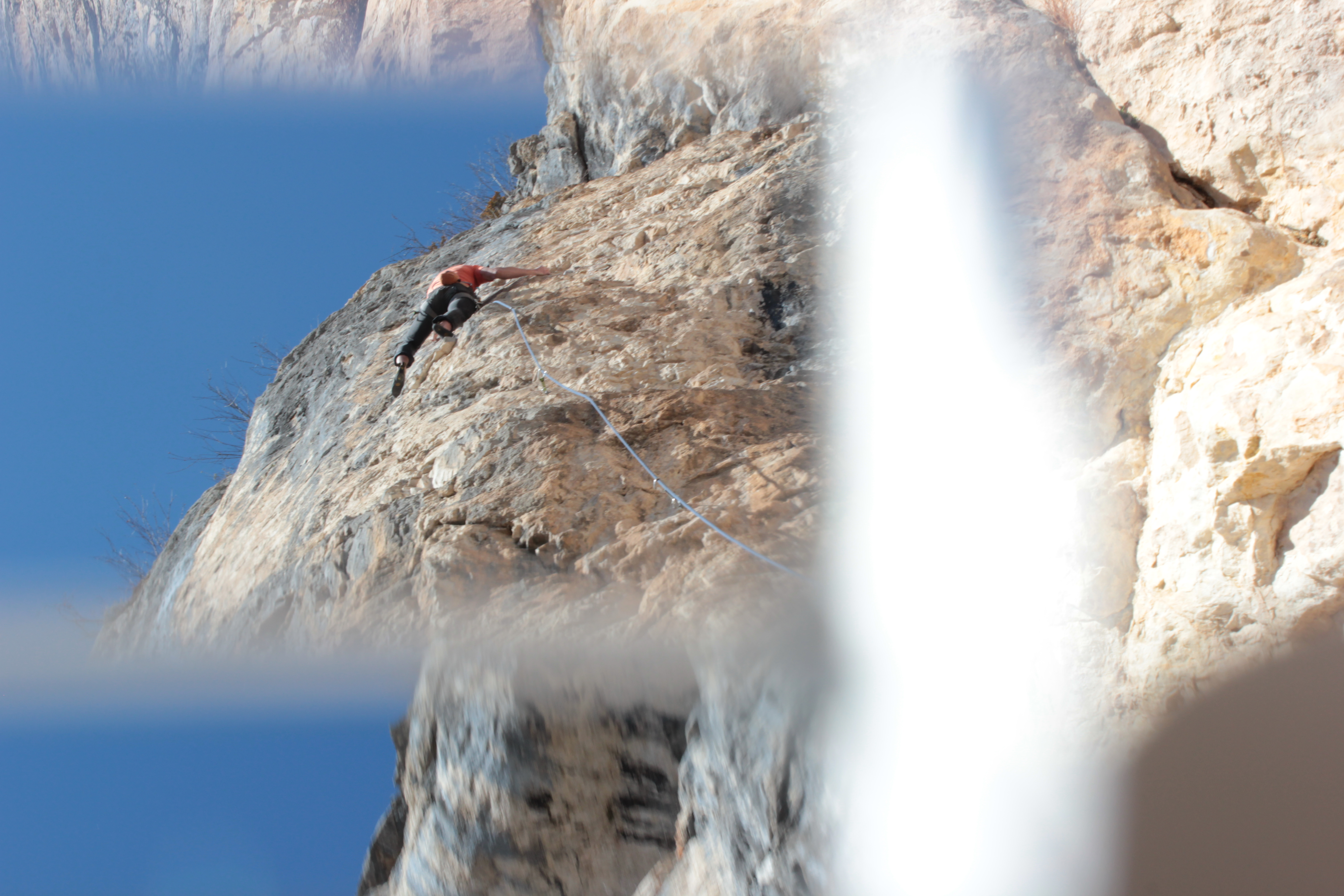
View through the prism

== See also ==
- Rock-climbing equipment, gear used in rock climbing and sport climbing
- Periscope, instrument for observation from a concealed position
