= Copperhead (climbing) =

Rock climbing equipment

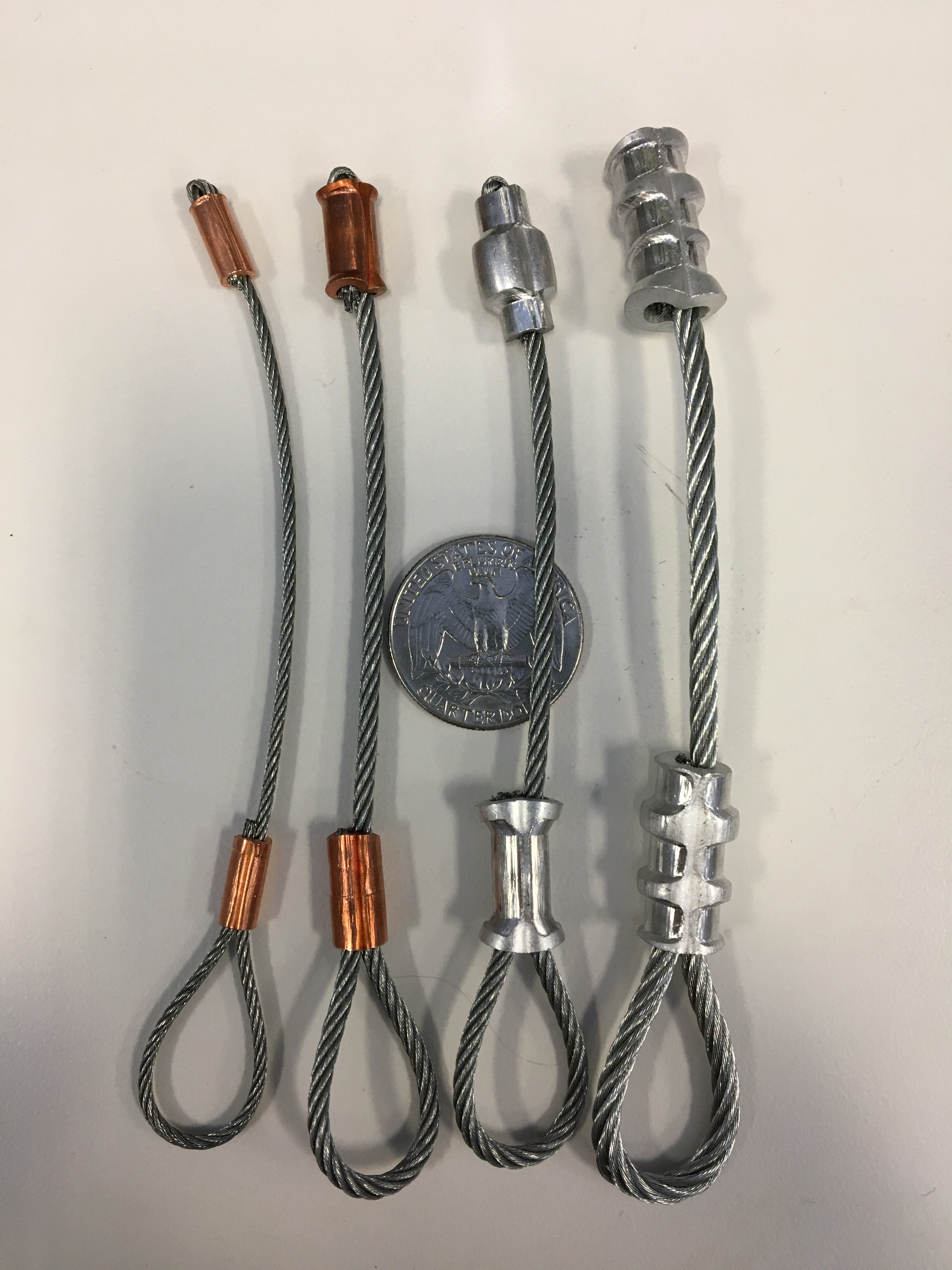
Four different copperheads

In rock climbing, a copperhead is a small nut with a head made of soft metal on a loop of wire, originally copper or brass, later aluminium. Copperheads are most often placed into small shallow seams and crevices by pounding or hammering them in to place, with a climbing hammer, sometimes with the aid of metal rod, chisel, or punch. The malleability of the soft metal head makes copperheads conform to the rock and grip better than other devices, and is often the only protection that will stay fixed in many placements. Their small size and low strength makes them among the poorest kinds of protection; their main use is in aid climbing where a placement that will just support the weight of the climber can be used to make progress, even though it would be useless in a fall. Variations such as Double-heads and Circleheads can also be used.

== See also ==
- Piton
- Bolt
- Climbing equipment
