= Removable bolt =

Mechanical protection device in climbing

A removable bolt (or RB), in climbing, is a spring loaded metal camming device used to anchor a person or a load to a rock or cement wall temporarily. Removable bolts negate the need to install permanent protection bolts to the wall, which can be costly and cause cosmetic damage. RBs are designed for use in bolting new sport climbing routes, setting temporary anchors on traditional routes, and on back-country expeditions where abandoning gear or placing permanent gear is not optimal. RBs are particularly popular when placing permanent bolts on steep walls with limited features, where other means of temporary protection, such as hooks, traditional camming devices, or slings, are not an option. By drilling a hole and inserting an RB, the bolter can ascend higher up on the rock before placing the next permanent piece of protection, thereby leaving a reasonable climbing distance between bolts on the finished route. RBs have also been designed and produced for fall prevention and safety in construction and mining operations.

Originally produced in the mid 1990s, removable bolts were at first reported to become permanently lodged in the rock after anchoring a fall. In the early 2000s, several companies redesigned the RB and the equipment has received positive feedback from users. RBs are used almost exclusively in bolting and cleaning new lines, often steep limestone, which is soft enough to be drilled with relative ease, and is particularly difficult to bolt without some load bearing anchor.

Removable bolts have been designed for particular climbing and industrial circumstances. ClimbTech's Kinder Edition Removable Bolt was designed for climber Joe Kinder, who required an RB that could be used on particularly dirty and moist rock. The additional surface area of the Kinder Edition RB provides better friction in these circumstances, and allowed Kinder and others to establish sport climbs in remote areas where variable rock quality necessitated careful bolt placement.

The typical RB is a 1/2 inch stopper designed to fit into a mechanically drilled hole. Other sizes have been developed, and further customizations continue to appear.
