= Hammer (climbing) =

For the placement and removal of protection

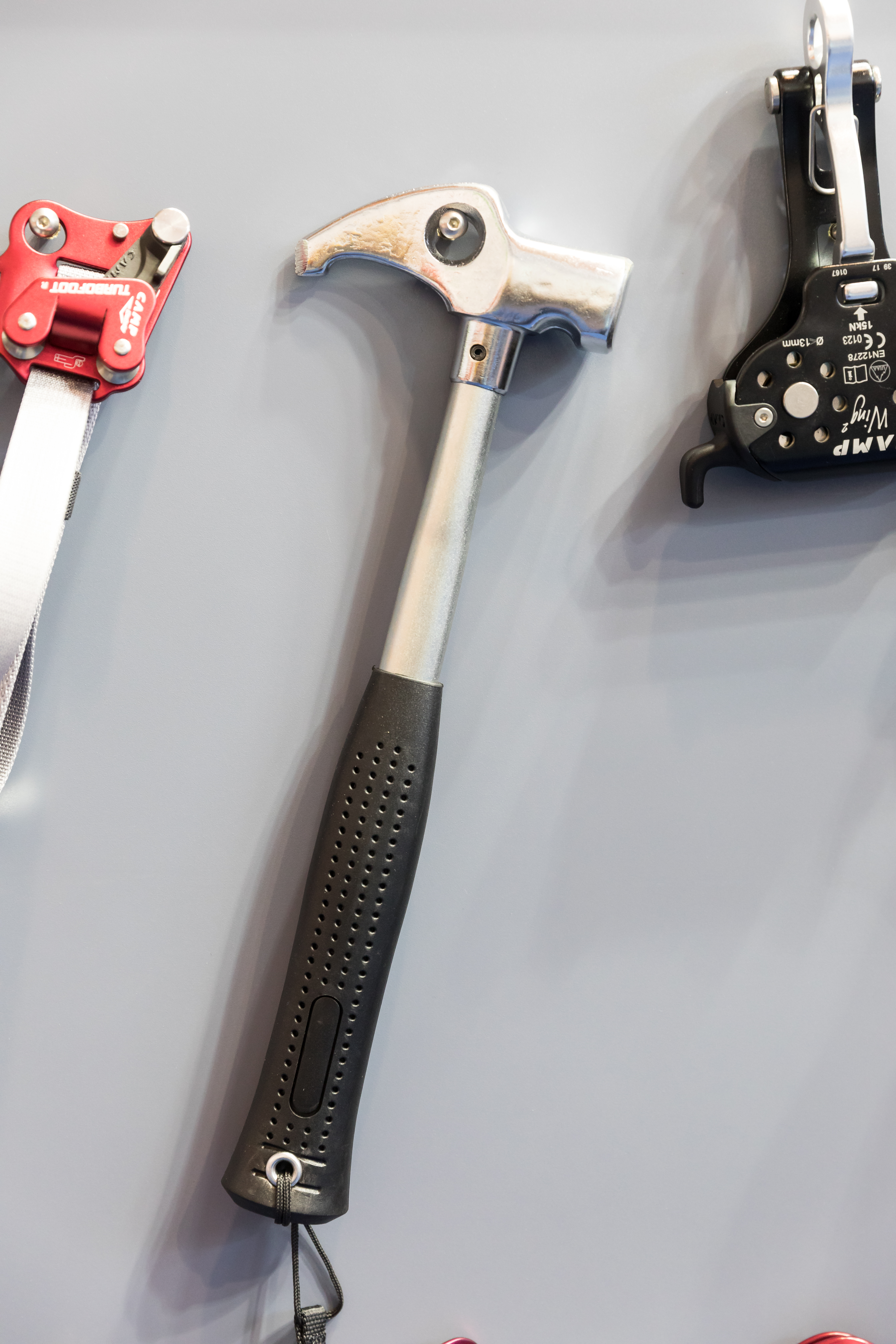
Rock climbing hammer

Rock climbing hammers, also known as wall hammers, big wall hammers, Yosemite hammers, or aid hammers, are a type of specialty hammer used mainly in aid climbing for the placement and removal of pitons, copper-heads, and circle-heads. They can also be used in the initial placement of fixed anchors (bolts) or the forceful removal of stuck free climbing protection.

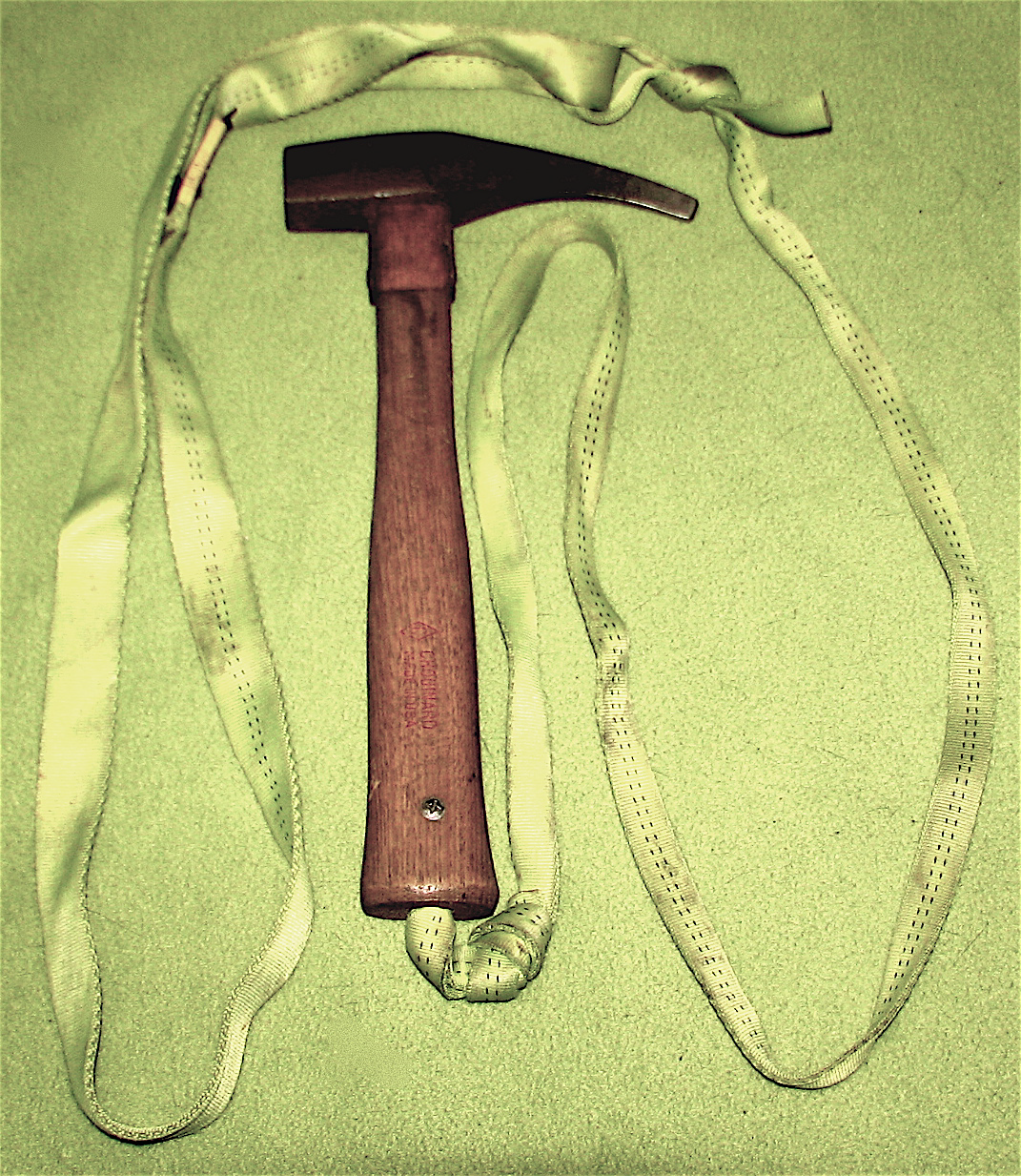
Chouinard Climbing Hammer

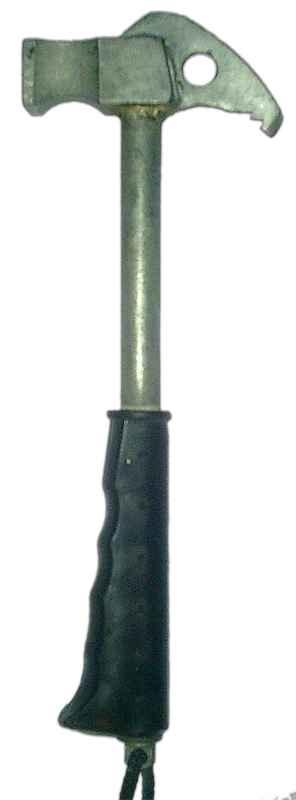
Climbing hammer

== See also ==
- Bolt
- Climbing equipment
- Piton
