= Reverso (climbing) =

Belay device for climbing

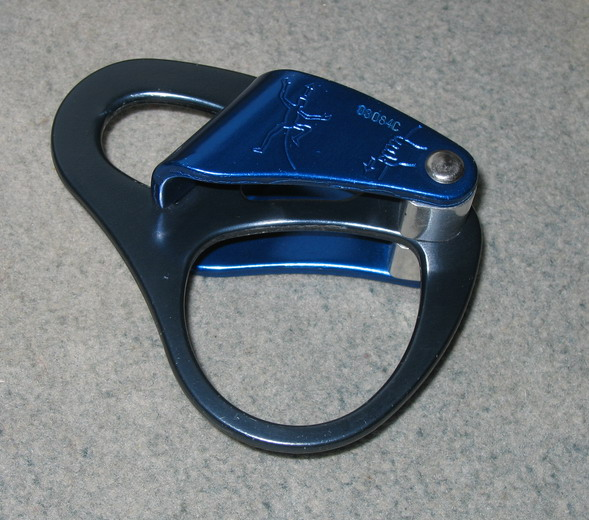
Reverso 1

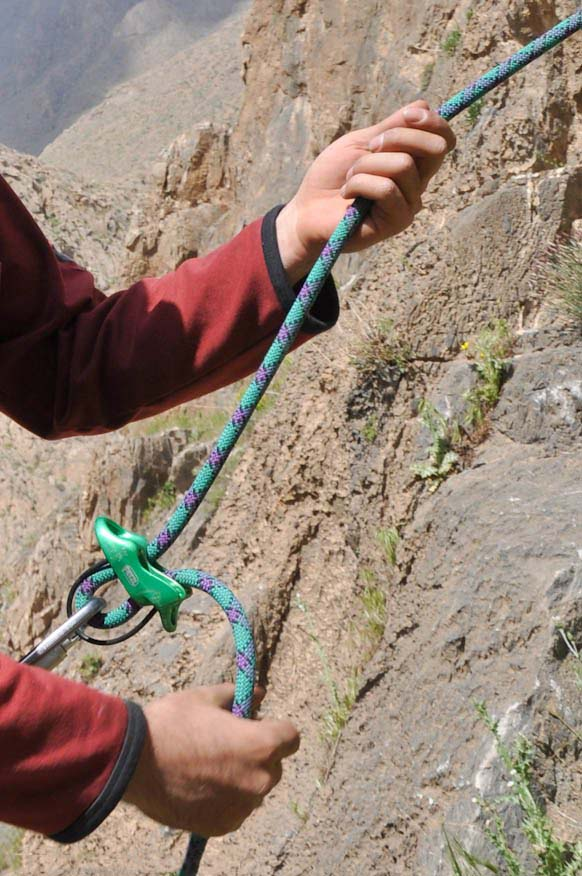
Reverso 3 in use

A Reverso is a belay device developed and patented by Petzl, used for example in rock-climbing and other activities which involve rope-work. Another version of this device is the Reversino, intended for use with thinner ropes.

A Reverso can be used to belay the leader, one or two seconds, or as a descender during rappelling. It can also be used in self-braking mode, to belay one or two seconds, if attached directly to the belay.

A Reverso is similar in design and use to an ATC when belaying a lead climber from below. A rope passes through the Reverso, through a carabiner attached to both the Reverso and the belayer's harness, and back through the same hole in the Reverso. This creates the friction required to properly belay a climber.

When belaying a seconder from the top of a climb, the Reverso is attached by a carabiner through the "extra loop" that an ATC does not have, to the anchors in the place of an italian hitch knot. Using this method, the device is self-locking, and cannot be released without extra gear.

== See also ==
- Climbing equipment
- Glossary of climbing terms
- Indoor climbing
