= Eileen Healey =

British mountaineer and bacteriologist

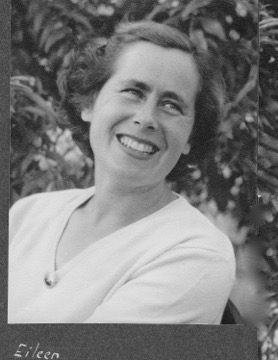
- Pictured 1959
- Born: Eileen Mary Gregory; 11 September 1920; Brighton, United Kingdom
- Died: 8 September 2010 (aged 89)
- Education: University of London
- Occupation: Pharmacologist
- Employer: Boots
- Organization(s): Pinnacle Club, Ladies' Alpine Club
- Known for: Mountaineering, filming 1959 Cho Oyo female expedition
- Spouse: Tim Healey
- Children: 2

Eileen Mary Gregory Healey (11 September 1920 – 8 September 2010) was a British pharmacologist, filmmaker and mountaineer. She was known for filming the tragic 1959 all female expedition to Cho Oyu, that resulted in the deaths of Claude Kogan, Claudine van der Stratten and Ang Norbu. Healey was a pioneering alpinist for her era, noted for her success on granite climbs in the Mont Blanc range at a time when few women were attempting these peaks.

== Biography ==
Eileen Mary Gregory was born in Brighton on 11 September 1920. Her parents instilled her love of climbing through childhood holidays hill walking in Wales and the Lake District. At age 11, Healey began keeping a climbing journal. She would continue to contribute to it until she was 39, recounting climbs in England, Scotland, Norway, the Swiss Alps and the Himalayas.

=== Mountaineering ===
Gregory attended University of London for studies in pharmacology. Upon graduation worked as a bacteriologist. She took a job in Nottingham so she could be closer to the mountains, later moving to Manchester. During the 1940s, Gregory took up mountaineering with earnest. In 1947, she spent her first season in the Alps, where she became known for her expertise in the Mont Blanc range. In 1956 she travelled on an expedition with Joyce Dunsheath to India, where the team surveyed the Bara Shigri Glacier. Gregory would climb several peaks in the Kullu region, including a first ascent via a new route on Deo Tibba (6,000m+).

She was a member of the women-only Pinnacle Club and the Ladies' Alpine Club, and became known for her skillful and competent climbs. While leading a climb up Mur y Niwl on Craig yr Ysfa, in north Wales, Gregory met Tim Healey. In 1958, the pair married.

=== 1959 expedition ===
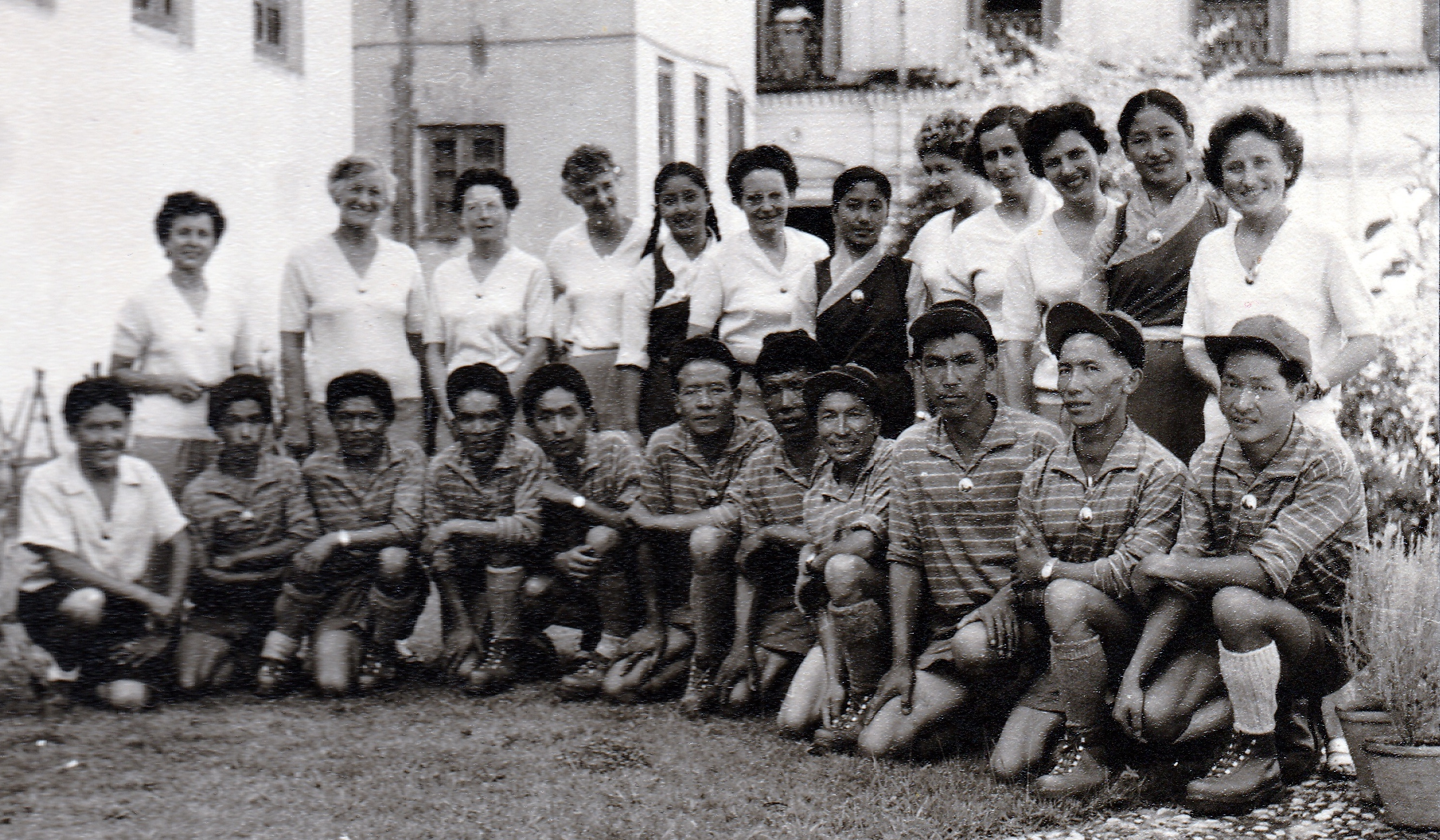
Photo of the 1959 Cho Oyu expedition prior to departure.

On the couple's first wedding anniversary, Eileen Healey left for Cho Oyu for the 1959 All-Women's expedition led by Claude Kogan. The 1959 expedition consisted of 12 experienced female mountaineers, including fellow Pinnacle Club members Dorothea Gravina and Margaret Darvall. The women's trip was heavily publicized and recognized to be the first expedition in mountaineering history consisting entirely of women and groundbreaking for the time. Healey brought her husband's 16mm camera along for the expedition to document the trip. The expedition would end with the deaths of four expedition members, including leader Claude Kogan. Healey's footage would provide a valuable account of what transpired, and contained some of the last images of Claude Kogan and Claudine van der Stratten before their deaths.

=== Later life ===
After Healey's return from Cho Oyu, she would continue to pursue her passion for climbing, as well as for sailing. Later, Healey and her family moved to Uganda, where she climbed Mount Kadam. After Idi Amin was ousted by a military coup, the Healey family returned to the United Kingdom. In 1968, Healey climbed the summit of Titlis in the Uri Alps along with a group of 60 women marking the inception of the Rendez-vous Hautes Montagnes.

In 2003, Healey reunited with Pem Pem Norgay, whom had joined the 1959 Cho Oyu expedition. In 2009, Healey's footage of the ill-fated expedition would be screened at the Kendal mountain festival in Cumbria, exactly fifty years after the initial expedition.

=== Death and legacy ===
Healey died on 8 September 2010. After her death, Healey's climbing diaries were discovered in the loft of her home. They have since been digitised and share a valuable history of mountaineering of her time. The names of many notable British climbers appearing within the diary's pages, including Monica Jackson, A.B. Hargreaves, Tony Moulam and Fred Pigott. In 2014, Healey's film of the Cho Oyu expedition was remastered into high definition for the BBC. Healey's amateur film of the expedition is considered an important early visual narrative of documentary filmmaking by women, and has been subject to extensive academic discourse.
