= Rendez-vous Hautes Montagnes =

Women's alpine climbing collective

Rendez vous Hautes Montagnes
- Formation: May 16, 1968
- Founder: Baronness Felicitas von Reznicek
- Founded at: Summit of Titlis
- Type: Network
- Purpose: Women's climbing network
- Origins: International meeting of women alpinists coinciding with the fiftieth anniversary of the Swiss Women's Alpine Club
- Region served: International, Europe
- Services: Yearly summer meeting and winter ski tour
- Methods: No constitution and no laws
- President: Sophie von Borstel (Germany), Karolin König (Austria)
- Website: https://www.rhm-climbing.net/

Rendez-vous Hautes Montagnes (RHM) is an international climbing organization founded by women alpinists. Founded in 1968, the organization remains an international women's climbing network for women climbers and mountaineers who can lead climbs of grade 5 and higher. The group was founded at a time when many women were excluded from male-only climbing clubs and is notable for its formation as an international climbing collective.

== Background ==
Since the golden age of alpinism, women had historically been excluded from Europe's alpine climbing clubs. The sole exception was France's Club Alpin Francais. As a result, early women climbers made their own climbing clubs, such as the Swiss Women's Alpine Club, Ladies' Scottish Climbing Club, the Pinnacle Club and the Ladies' Alpine Club.

=== Creation ===
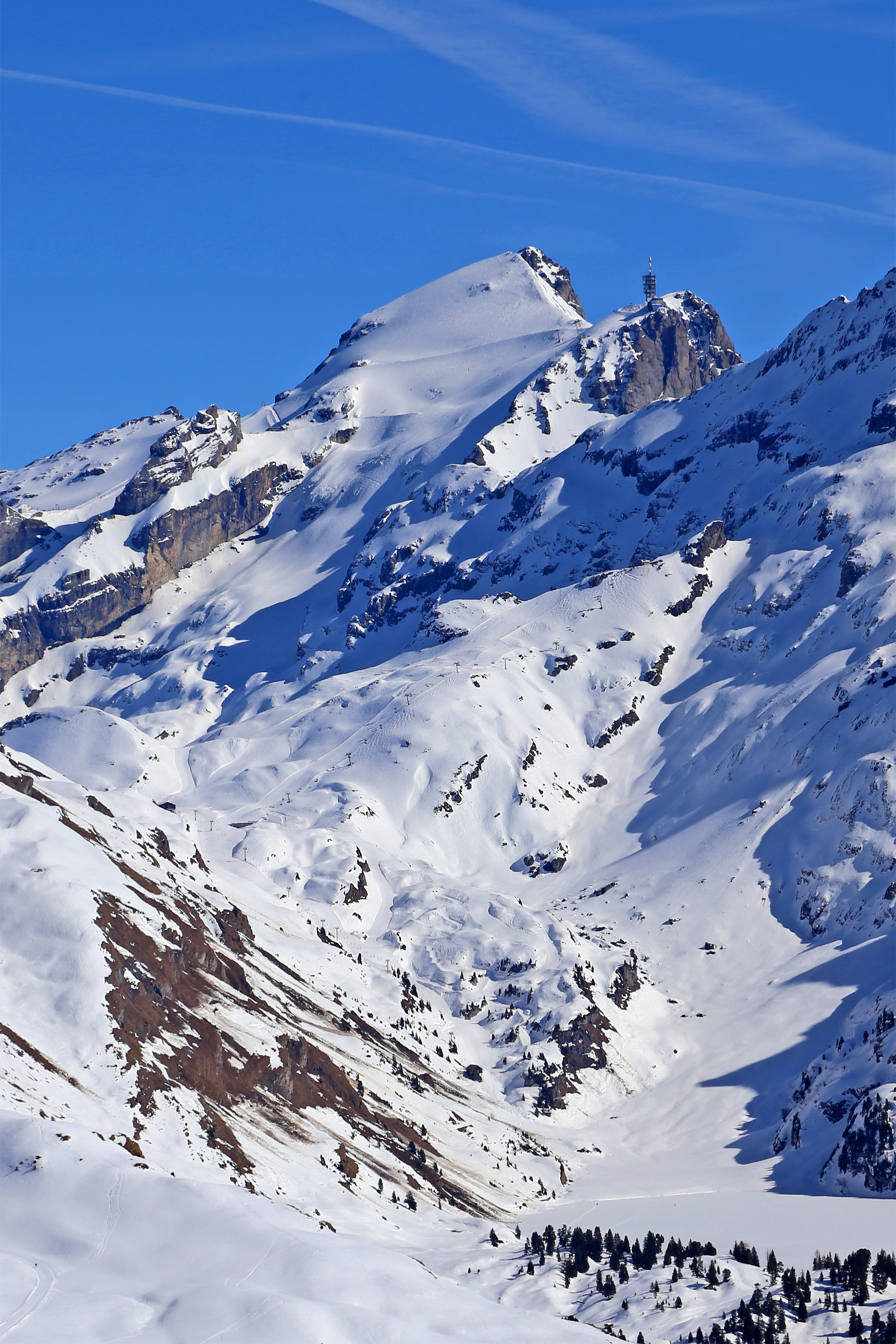
Summit of Titlis in the Uri Alps, where the RHM was founded.

On May 16, 1968, Baroness Felicitas von Reznicek led an international group of sixty female mountaineers and their husbands to the summit of Titlis in the Uri Alps. The occasion coincided with the fiftieth anniversary of the Swiss Women's Alpine Club and sought to bring women mountaineers together from different countries for the first time.

At the summit, Baroness von Reznicek proclaimed, ”Es lebe das Rendez-vous Hautes Montagnes” in three languages, and toasted the assembled party with champagne from a snow bar.

A group of women from Czechoslovakia, Germany, France, Great Britain, Italy, Yugoslavia, Netherlands, Austria and Poland would remain in Engelberg for the next week, later forming the network that would become Rendez-vous Hautes Montagnes. They included some of Europe's top women alpinists of the time, including: Blažena Karasová, Halina Krüger-Syrokomska, Colette Le Bret, Christine de Colombel, Jeanne Franco, Nea Morin, Eileen Healey, Silvia Buscaini, Nadja Fajdiga and Helma Schimke.

=== Organization ===
Felicitas von Reznicek would serve as the network's first president until 1982, when she took the role of Honorary President until 1997. Swiss climber Verena Jäggin served as the organization's following president for the next thirty years.

Since its founding, the Rendez-vous Hautes Montagnes would fill a niche for women climbers until traditional alpine clubs would open to female membership. In 1975, women would first be allowed to join the Alpine Club. It would not be until 1980 when women were permitted to join the Swiss Alpine Club.

Based in Switzerland, the organization operates as a loose network with no formal rules and "no laws", governed by local country coordinators. Each year, the association comes together for two gatherings, a summer climbing expedition and a winter ski tour.

Rendez-vous Hautes Montagnes has country coordinators in Switzerland, Austria, France, Slovakia, Italy, England, Slovenia, Serbia, Germany, Netherlands, the Czech Republic and Bosnia. Outside of these countries, other members are welcome, including from the United States.

=== Exhibition ===
From 2024 to 2025, the Talmuseum Engelberg exhibited Frauen am Seil - Die Geschichte des Rendez-vous Hautes Montagnes, a showcase dedicated to the history of the Rendez-vous Hautes Montagnes.

== Notable members ==
- Arlene Blum
- Irmgard Braun
- Heidi Lüdi
- Caroline Fink

== See also ==
- List of alpine clubs
