= Dorothy Thompson (disambiguation) =

Dorothy Thompson (1893–1961) was an American journalist.

Dorothy Thompson may also refer to:

- Dorothy Thompson (businesswoman) (born 1960), former CEO of Drax Group
- Dorothy Thompson (historian) (1923–2011), British historian
- Dorothy Thompson (mountaineer) (1888–1961), English mountain climber
- Dorothy Burr Thompson (1900–2001), American archaeologist
- Dorothy J. Thompson (born 1939), British classicist and papyrologist
- Dorothy Perry Thompson (1944—2002), American poet, educator, and activist
- Dorothy Ashby (1932–1986), née Dorothy Jeanne Thompson, American jazz harpist and composer
- Dorothy Thompson, a character from the children's show Postman Pat
- Dot Thompson (1914–2001), director at New Theatre, Melbourne
