= Dorothy Thompson (mountaineer) =

English mountaineer (1888–1961)

Dorothy Evelyn Thompson (29 May 1888 – 2 December 1961) was an English mountaineer known for her climbs in the Alps. From the mid-1920s through to WW2 she was regarded as 'one of the really great British women climbers'.

== Early years ==
Thompson was born in Kensington to Frederick Charles Thompson (a civil servant in the India Office) and Eleanor Frances (née Wilson). Her parents were frequent hill walkers and she began climbing in Perthshire as a child on family holidays. She joined the Fell and Rock Climbing Club in 1919, while working as a secretary for the School of Oriental Studies in Bloomsbury, the Ladies Alpine Club in 1924 and she also became an early member of the Pinnacle Club. She was known as 'Tommy' to her climbing partners. With Dorothy Pilley Richards she visited the mountains of Corsica over Easter 1922 and the Pyrenees over Easter 1923 before her first trip to the Alps.

== Alpine climbing ==
It was Dorothy Pilley who introduced her to the guide Joseph Georges (who in 1928 made the celebrated first ascent of the north north west ridge of the Dent Blanche with Pilley and her husband). That introduction was made in 1923 but it was in 1925 that Thompson first spent a full season climbing in the Chamonix area of the Alps with Georges. She continued to climb regularly with him for many years although she also climbed 'guideless' with other parties.

In 1929 she became the first woman to ascend Mont Blanc via the Brouillard Ridge, a record that she only became aware of after the event. In 1934 she climbed Mont Blanc via the Aiguille de Bionassay, and became the first person to descend the mountain via the Peuteret Ridge, which even some years later was regarded as 'the finest, longest and most difficult ridge in the Alps - something to which all great climbers aspire but few achieve'.

== Later life ==
Thompson completed a book of her climbing memoirs after the Second World War, but only published it privately. She died in Heathfield, East Sussex, in 1961. After her death, her friends and the Ladies' Alpine Club published her memoirs, titled Climbing with Joseph Georges, in 1962.
