= Loulou Boulaz =

Mountain climber and alpine skier (1908-1991)

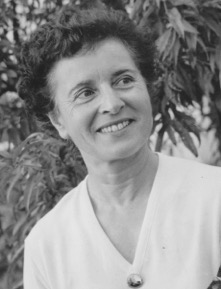
Loulou Boulaz in Nepal, 1959

Louise "Loulou" Boulaz (6 February 1908 – 13 June 1991) was a Swiss mountain climber and alpine skier who made numerous first ascents in the Alps.

== Biography ==
Boulaz was born in Avenches, Switzerland. She attended a trade school and worked as a journalist for the International Labour Organization in Geneva.

Boulaz began climbing in the Alps in the 1930s and continued making major ascents until the 1970s. Of her major climbs, four were the first ascents and at least nine were the first female or all-female ascents. At the start of her career, Boulaz and Lulu Durand became the first women to climb the Dent du Requin (1932) and the southwest face of the Dent du Géant. She made a number of climbs with Durand in 1935: the first female traverse of the Aiguille des Grands Charmoz; the first female traverse of Les Droites; the first female ascent of the north face of the Petit Dru (with Raymond Lambert), and the second ascent ever; the first female ascent of the Central Spur of the Grandes Jorasses; the Aiguille Noire de Peuterey; and the Brenva Face of Mont Blanc. She was the first person to climb the east face of the Bel Oiseau (1938), the north face of Mont Vélan (1941), and the Rothorn of Valais (1941). She was the first woman to climb the Pear Buttress on Mont Blanc's Brenva Face (1939), the Walker Spur of the Grandes Jorasses (1952), and the north face of the Cima Grande di Lavaredo (1960).

Outside the Alps, Boulaz often traveled within the Himalayas, the Caucasus and the Sahara. In 1959, she was a member of the all-female expedition to Cho Oyu, 8,188 m (26,864 ft) and the sixth-highest mountain in the world, where Claude Kogan, Claudine van der Straten-Ponthoz and three Sherpas died during an avalanche. In 1977, she was the first to climb a new route in the Aïr Mountains of the Sahara, which she named Tour Loulou. She was made an honorary member of the Swiss Alpine Club, even though the club did not allow women to become members at the time, as well as holding honorary membership of the Ladies' Alpine Club and the Alpine Club.

Boulaz was also a successful alpine skier; she was a member of the Swiss national ski team in 1936 and 1937, and in 1937 she placed fourth in the FIS World Ski Championships slalom category in Chamonix.
