= Dorothea Gravina =

British mountain climber

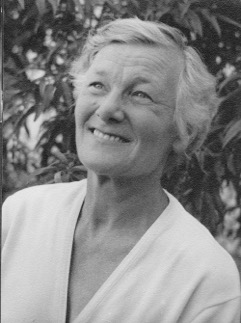
- Gravina in 1959
- Born: 5 April 1905
- Died: 1 July 1990 (aged 85)
- Other names: Molly Briggs, Briggsie
- Spouse: Count Gravina (m. 1933)
- Children: 3

Dorothea Margaret Home Rawdon Briggs (5 April 1905 – July 1990), was usually called by her maiden name, Molly Briggs or "Briggsie". She was a mountain climber, described as a "charismatic adventurer", and Girl Guide leader.

== Personal life ==
Briggsie became Countess Gravina in 1933 when she married the Count Gilberto Gravina (1890-1972), by then a widower, in Buckingham on 16 September 1933.

After the marriage, they lived at Merano in the Italian Tyrol and she climbed and skied in the Alps with her husband, and an uncle, Binnie Briggs, who was a founding member of the Alpine Ski Club. She and her husband had three children, including Christopher, later Count Gravina, and Michael who also took up climbing and was part of the team which made the first ascent of Pumasillo in 1957.

Her mother-in-law, Blandine Gravina a predecessor as Countess Gravina, was the daughter of the celebrated conductor Hans von Bülow and his wife Cosima (later the mistress, then the wife, of the composer Richard Wagner).

At the outbreak of the Second World War, Briggsie, a Briton in enemy territory, made her way with her sons to England, where she lived in a caravan on a farm, and got a job delivering milk door-to-door to keep herself and her small sons. She never saw her husband again, but at the time of his death she was living in Frittenden, Cranbrook, Kent and she attended his funeral with the youngest son Michael.

Briggsie was a long-term member of the Girl Guide movement, with roles including division commissioner for Kent, and was a friend of Lady Baden-Powell, the World Chief Guide. In 1963 she was President of the Pinnacle Club.

== Climbing ==
Briggsie started climbing when she was 4 years old, on the roof of her home in Yorkshire. In the 1920s she travelled in South and East Africa, and was possibly the first woman to climb Kilimanjaro.

She joined the Ladies' Alpine Club in 1955 and in 1959, aged 55, went to the Himalayas as a member of the International Women's Expedition to Cho Oyu, 8,188 m (26,864 ft) and the sixth-highest mountain in the world. The all female team also included Loulou Boulaz from Switzerland, Margaret Darvall and Eileen Healey from the UK, and the French mountaineers Claudine van der Straten, Jeanne Franco, Colette LeBret, Micheline Rambaud and Claude Kogan, who was the overall leader. Amongst the Nepali members were Tenzing's daughters Nima and Pem-Pem and his niece Dhoma. Briggsie took command of the expedition after Kogan, van der Straten-Ponthoz, and two Sherpa porters had perished in an avalanche at 23,000 feet. Their attempt to scale the sixth highest mountain in the world was the first time in history that an expedition composed entirely of women (excepting guides and porters) had ever challenged such a peak.

In 1962 she joined the Women's Jagdula Expedition to Lha Shamma in Nepal with Jo Scarr and Denise Evans (the wife of the Everest mountaineer Charles Evans). The Pinnacle Club party successfully made the first ascents of Kagmara I, II and III in the Dolpo area of Nepal.

In about 1968, Briggsie went to South Africa and climbed there. She travelled on to Tanzania, and climbed Kilimanjaro. She then travelled on northwards, by third class railway through the Sudan, where the other passengers (all Muslim) required her to "cover up". She eventually reached Egypt, and much to her disappointment had to fly to Italy, where she hitch-hiked up the spine in a fish-lorry that picked her up at 6 in the morning. She eventually arrived at the home of her friend Olave Baden-Powell at Hampton Court Palace, where she stayed a few days before going home.
