= List of glaciers in India =

Overview of glaciers in India

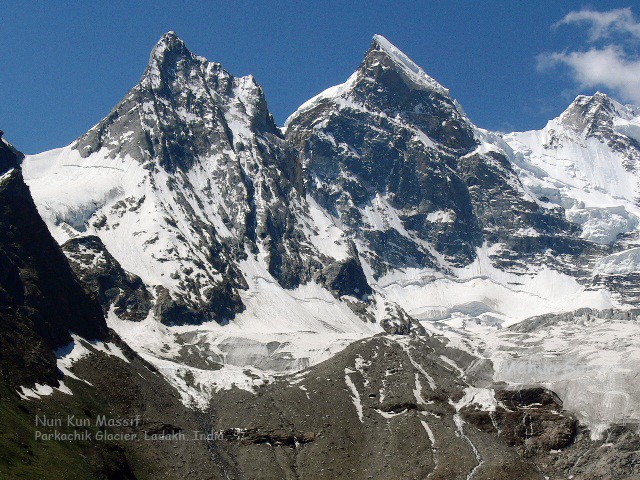
Parkachik Glacier, Nun Kun Massif

The Himalayan region of India is home to some of the most notable glaciers in the world, including the Siachen Glacier, the second-largest non-polar glacier on Earth and the largest glacier in India. The following is a list of the most important glaciers in India. Most glaciers lie in the union territory of Ladakh and Jammu and Kashmir and the states of Himachal Pradesh, Sikkim, and Uttarakhand.

A few glaciers are also found in Arunachal Pradesh.

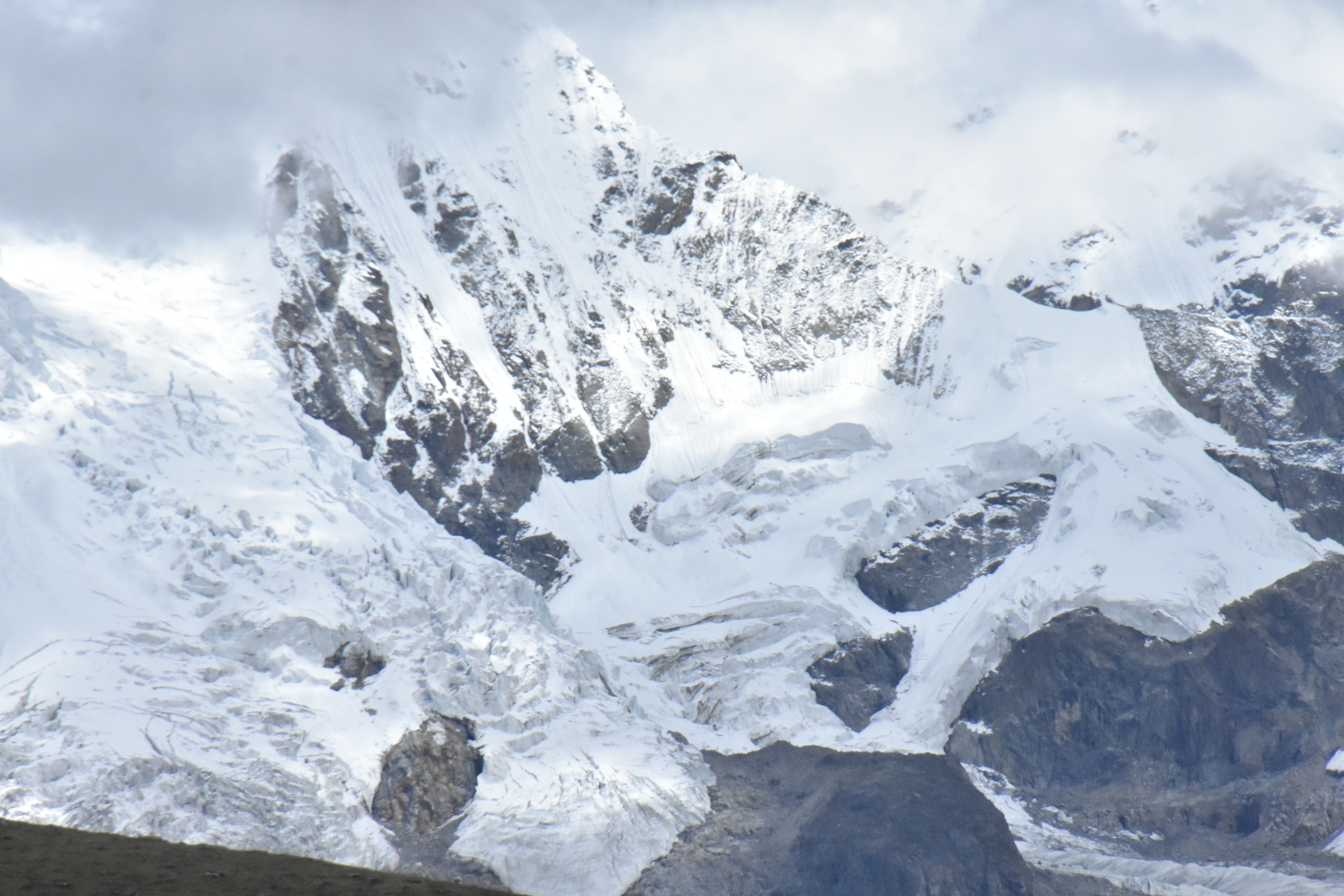
Glacier in Sikkim Himalaya

== List of Indian glaciers ==
=== Arunachal Pradesh ===
In Arunachal Pradesh, glaciers are found in Great Himalayas ranges which run along the Tibetan border. All peaks here rise above 4500 meters and are snow covered throughout the year.

Important glaciers include:

- Bichom Glacier
- Kangto Glacier
- Mazgol Glacier

=== Himachal Pradesh ===
- Bara Shigri Glacier
- BCB Glacier (bcb land)
- Beas Kund glacier
- Bhadal Glacier
- Bhaga Glacier
- Chandra Glacier
- Chandra Nahan Glacier
- Chhota Shigri
- Dhaka Glacier
- North Dakka Glacier
- Gora Glacier
- The Lady of Keylong
- Miyar Glacier
- Mukkila Glacier
- Parvathi and Dudhon
- Perad Glacier
- Sonapani
- Gara
- Gor Gorang
- Shaune Gorang
- Nagpo Tokpo

=== Sikkim ===
- Zemu Glacier
- Rathong Glacier
- Lonak Glacier

=== Union Territory of Ladakh ===
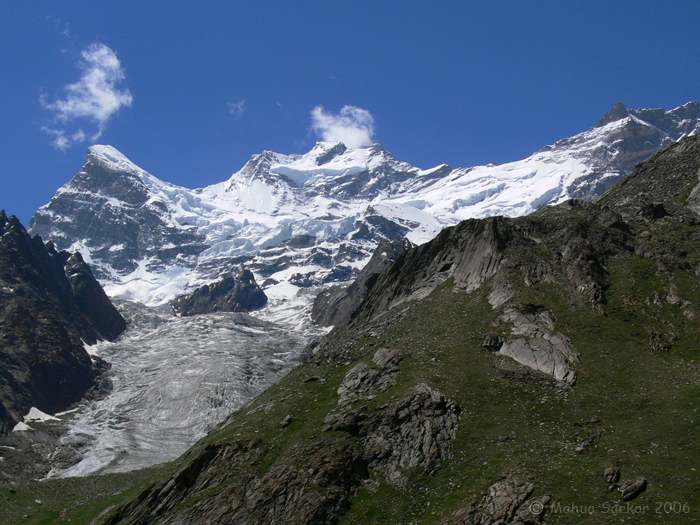
Nun Kun Massif

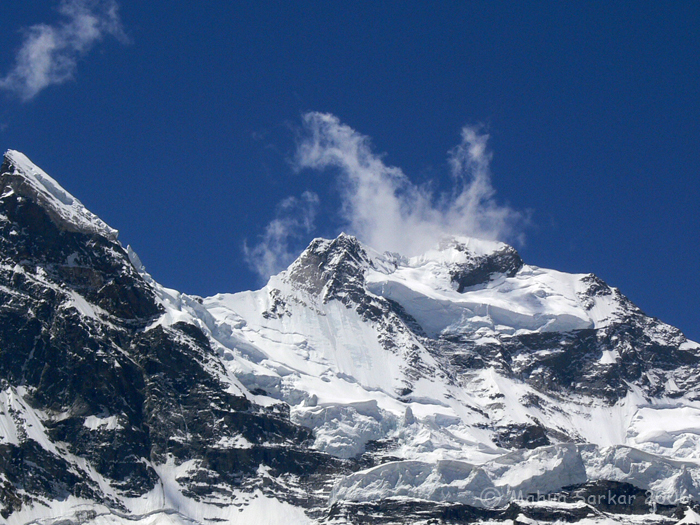
Parkachik

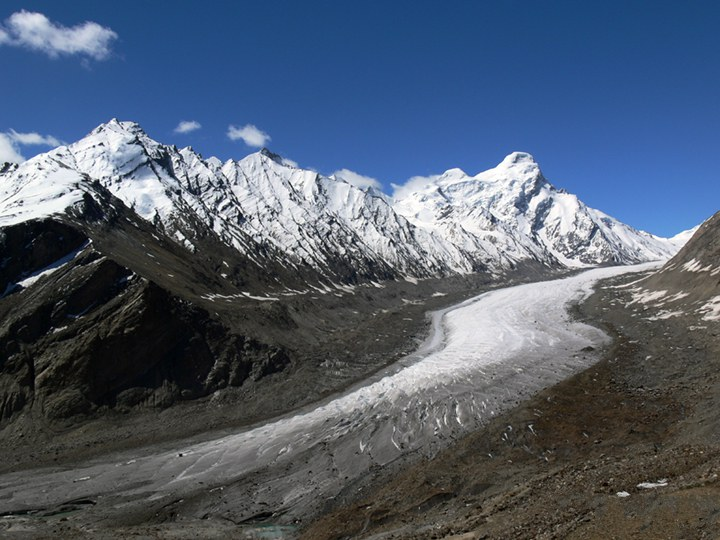
Drang-Drung-Glacier

- Siachen Glacier – the second-longest glacier outside the polar regions and the largest glacier in the Himalayas-Karakoram region.
- Hari parbat Glacier
- Chong Kmdan Glacier
- Drang-Drung Glacier
- Kazi N Glacier
- Machoi Glacier
- Nubra Glacier
- Nun Kun
- Parkachik Glacier
- Shafat Glacier
- Shirwali Glacier
- Rimo Glacier
- Tayseer Glacier
- Stok Glacier

=== Uttarakhand ===
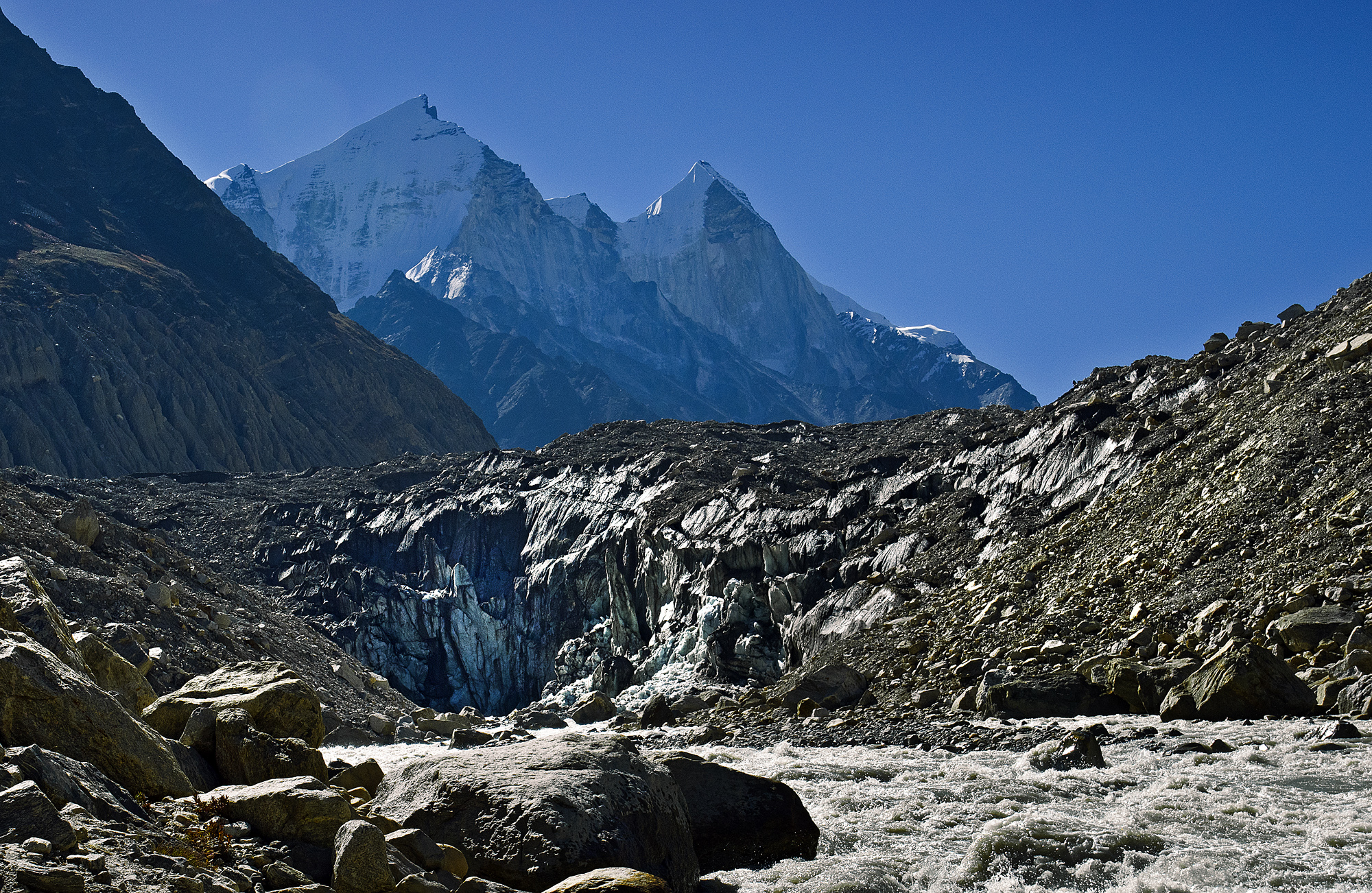
Goumukh, terminus of the Gangotri glacier. The Bhagirathi peaks rise in the background.

- Arwa Glacier
- Bagini Glacier
- Bhagirathi Kharak Glacier
- Bandarpunch
- Changabang Glacier
- Chaturangi Glacier
- Chorabari Glacier
- Dakshini Nanda Devi Glacier
- Dakshini Rishi Glacier
- Dokriani Glacier
- Gangotri Glacier
- Ghanohim Bamak
- Jaundhar Glacier
- Kafni Glacier
- Kalabaland Glacier
- Kedar Bamak Glacier
- Kirti Bamak
- Lawan Glacier
- Maiandi Bamak
- Mana Glacier
- Meola Glacier
- Meru Bamak
- Milam Glacier
- Namik Glacier
- Panchchuli Glacier
- Panpatia Glacier
- Paschimi Kamet Glacier
- Pindari Glacier
- Purbi Kamet Glacier
- Raikana Glacier
- Raktavarn Glacier
- Ralam Glacier
- Ramani Glacier
- Satopanth Glacier
- Seeta Glacier
- Shalang Glacier
- Sona Glacier
- Suralaya Glacier
- Sunderdhunga Glacier
- Swachhand Glacier
- Swetvarn Glacier
- Thelu Glacier
- Tipra Bamak
- Trisul Glacier
- Uttari Nanda Devi Glacier
- Uttari Rishi Glacier
- Vasuki Glacier

== See also ==
- List of glaciers
