= Ray Lambert (disambiguation) =

Raymond or Ray Lambert may refer to:

- Raymond Lambert (1914–1997), Swiss mountaineer
- Ray Lambert (1922–2009), Welsh footballer
- Ray Lambert, character in Babes on Broadway
