= Pat Kelly (climber) =

English Female climber, born 1873

Emily Kelly
Personal information
- Nickname: Pat
- Born: 1873
- Died: April 26, 1922 (aged 48–49) Wales

Martha Emily "Pat" Kelly (née Bowler) (Mar Qtr 1873 – 26 April 1922) was an early female climber, and a founder of the Pinnacle Club.

== Early life ==
Kelly was the eldest child within a large family. She took up climbing in 1914, and is reported to have been "a graceful and bold balance climber".

By 1917 she was married to the climber Harry Mills Kelly (1884-1980). They lived and shared an office together at 29 Fountain Street in Levenshulme, Manchester where he worked as an insurance clerk.

== Climbing ==
One of her best known achievements was to solo a rock climb known as Jones' route up Scafell pinnacle from Deep Ghyll in the Lake District. Those who watched her expressed their consternation at seeing a lone person ascending its rocky arete.

Kelly actively encouraged many women to climb. By 1920, her and her husband's office was being used as a base for her work, which culminated in a letter jointly written by Eleanor Winthrop Young being published in the Manchester Guardian in which she proposed the founding of a women-only club for rock climbers. Their letter garnered support from its editor, C E Montague, who, alongside his wife, were also climbers. This resulted in the founding of the Pinnacle Club, the first rock-climbing club solely for women, at Pen-y-Gwryd in north Wales on 26 March 1921. Kelly became the Pinnacle Club's first honorary secretary, and Winthrop Young its first president.

Ten years after her death the Pinnacle Club acquired a climbing hut in Snowdonia which they named the Emily Kelly Hut in her memory.

== Death ==
A year after forming the Pinnacle Club, Pat Kelly died as a result of injuries she sustained during a mysterious climbing accident on Tryfan on 17 April at the end of the 1922 Easter meet of the Pinnacle Club in North Wales. Right at the end of the day, she was found lying on her own, severely injured, at the base of apparently easy-to-climb rocks, albeit with one climbing boot missing. She was taken to Caernarvonshire and Anglesey Infirmary in Bangor, but died some days later on 26 April 1922 from fractures to the base of her skull.
