= Brede =

Brede may refer to:

== Places ==
- Brede, East Sussex, a village near the River Brede
- Brede, Denmark, a suburb of Copenhagen, Denmark

== Other uses ==
- Brede (name)
- Brede Shipspouse, a fictional character created by Julian May; see Saga of Pliocene Exile#The race from Lene
- River Brede, East Sussex, England
- Brede-class lifeboat, operated by the Royal National Lifeboat Institution between 1982 and 2002
