= Im Fout labor camp =

Forced labor camp

Coordinates: 32°43′46″N 7°55′51″W

- Labor camp
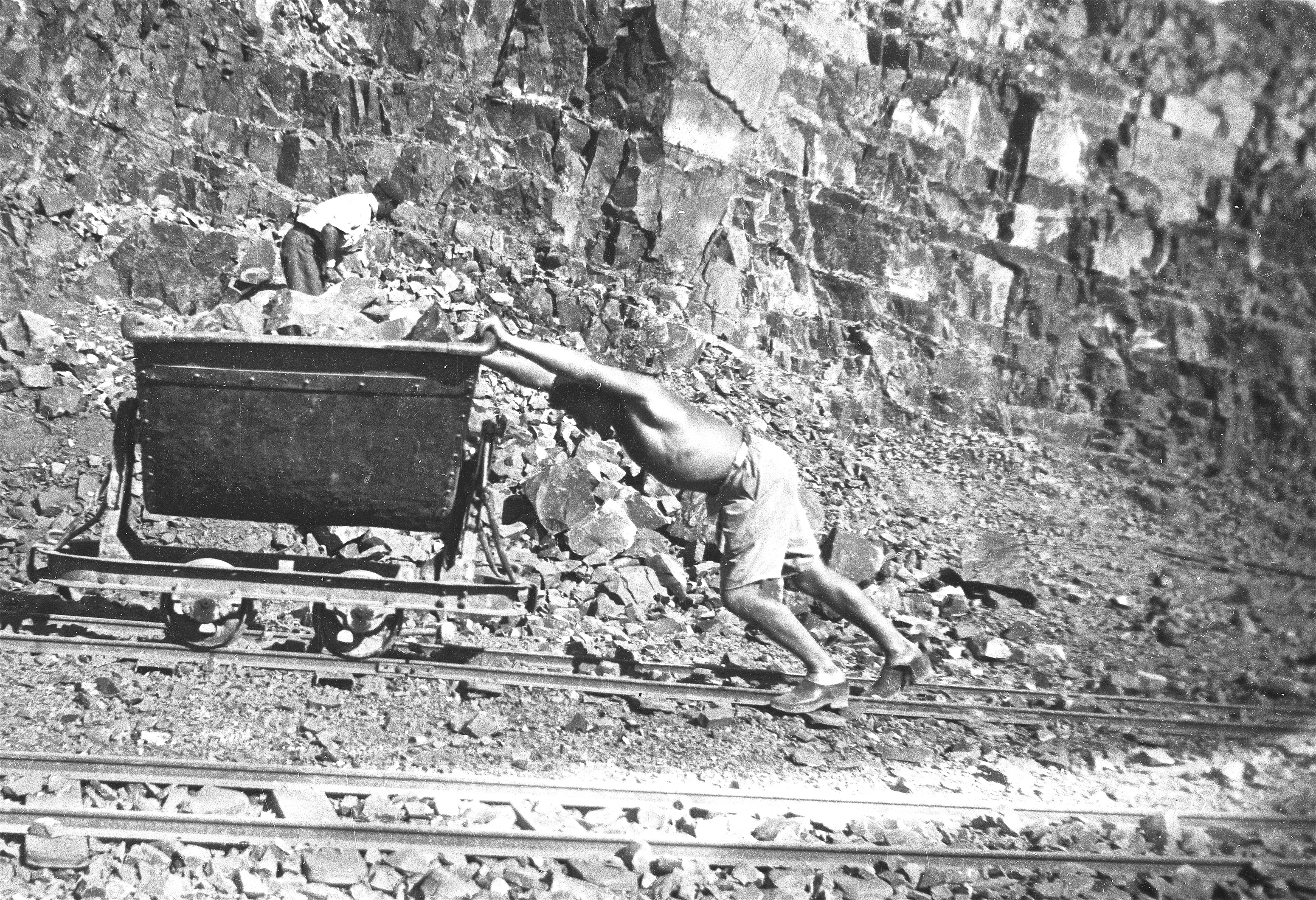
- A German Jewish prisoner pushes a cart in the stone quarry of the Im Fout labor camp

- Location within Morocco
- Other names: Imfout, Im-Fout, Imfoud, In-Fout, In-Foud, Qujda-Imfout
- Operated by: Vichy France
- Inmates: Groupe des Travailleurs Étrangers

The Im Fout labor camp was a forced labor camp established by 1941 by Vichy France near the construction site of the Im Fout Dam on the Oum Er-Rbia River in Morocco, at the time a French protectorate. Most of Im Fout's prisoners were political prisoners, demobilized soldiers, former military volunteers, and "undesirables" classified as "foreign workers" (Groupement de travailleurs étrangers (GTE)) by the Department of Industrial Production (Direction de la Production Industrielle) in Rabat. The Im Fout cohort was designated as GTE No. 9. Im Fout was the main center for demobilized soldiers and former war volunteers designated as "foreign workers" in Axis-occupied North Africa.

The camp's structures included low-ceilinged cement barracks with cement floors, which were stocked with bedbug-infested wooden beds with straw mattresses and one blanket for each prisoner—approximately 100 men per barrack. The camp also had a library, containing books and games that the prisoners shared with the laborers. There were no places of worship accessible to prisoners. The camp's population was recorded at 264 (Note: 205 prisoners were present at the time of Dr. Wyss-Dunant's visit, with 19 hospitalized and 29 on external assignment among the absent.) by ICRC physician Edouard Wyss-Dunant in July 1942, but had dropped to 23 (Note: Recorded by ICRC representative Édouard Conod as 9 Spaniards, 9 Germans and Austrians, 3 Russians, 1 Italian, and 1 Pole) men, all soon to be released, by April 1943. 59 of the camp's prisoners were Polish nationals.

While the camp's assembly hall was under construction, the prisoners ate at the canteen for the dam construction workers. Breakfast foods included bacon, boiled eggs, coffee, jam, and sardines; lunch foods included baked potatoes, cheese, chickpea salad, "eggs with spicy sauce", lamb stew, roast pork, squash salad, stuffed tomatoes, tomato salad, watermelon, and wine; dinner foods included beef stew, biscuits, fig squares, hard-boiled eggs with tomato sauce, lentils, mashed beans, onion soup, pork stew, pork, vegetable soup, and wine. They drank spring water brought by truck, and bathed in the Oum Er-Rbia River.

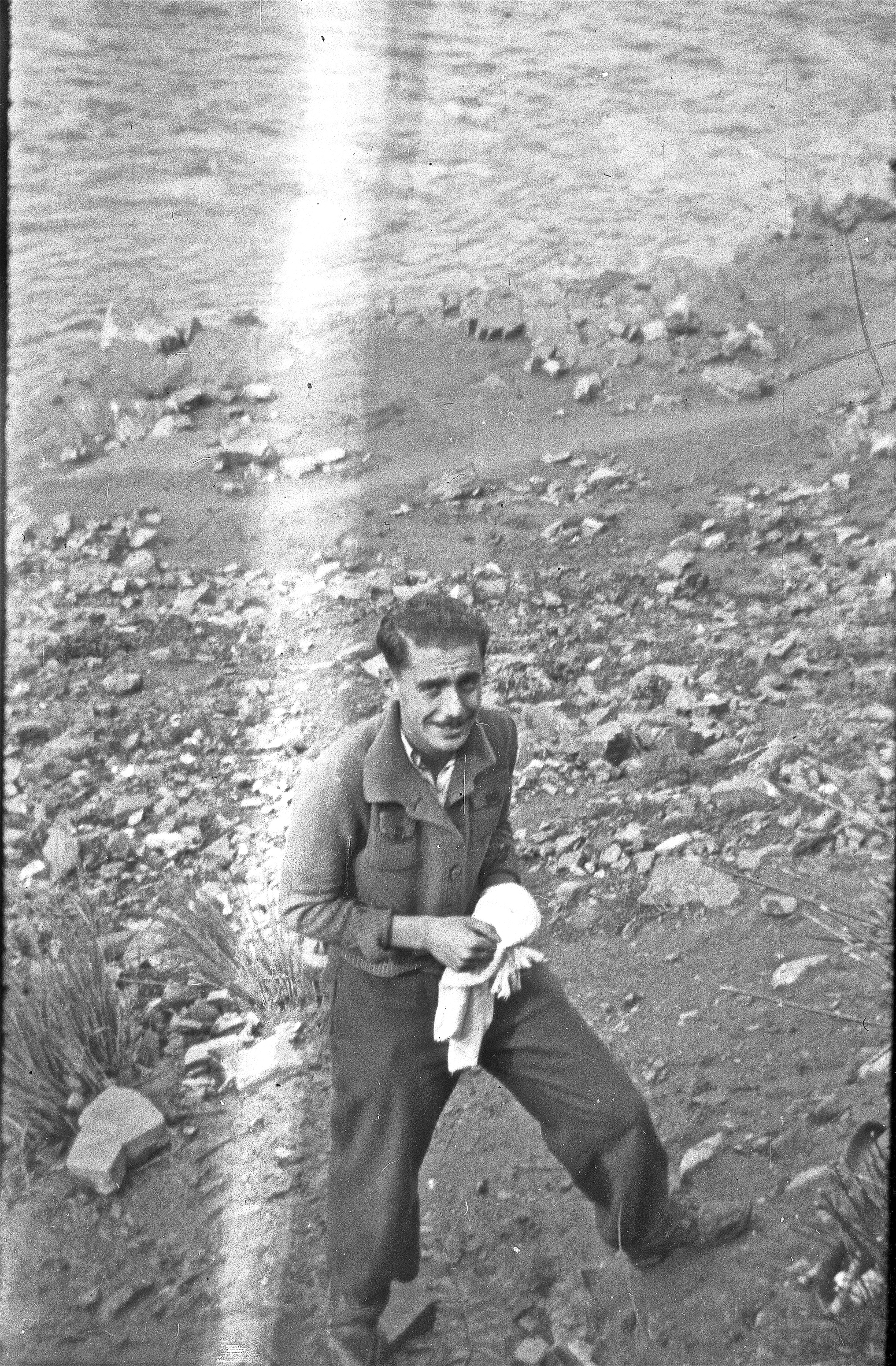
Very sick prisoners, like Sami Dorra (pictured working at the dam) were taken to a hospital in Casablanca for treatment.

A "well set-up infirmary" was supervised by a male nurse, and a doctor visited the camp weekly to treat mild ailments. Dozens of prisoners suffered from malaria, and survivor Sami Dorra testifies that there were cases of typhus at the camp. Very sick prisoners were taken for treatment to a hospital in Casablanca. Dr. Wyss-Dunant reported that morale at the camp was very low, since the prisoners' calls for release were generally unheard, and many suffered from health problems.

The laborers were paid a daily wage of 1.50 francs, with the possibility of earning a bonus. The prisoners were issued shorts in the summer, and work suits, raincoats, and sweaters in the winter. They were permitted to wash their clothes once per week. They were allowed an annual 12 days of leave, and received mail, which was distributed daily.

As of May 31, 2006, prisoners interned at Im Fout until November 1942 were recognized by the German government as eligible for reparations following the negotiations of the Jewish Claims Conference.
