= Dora de Beer =

New Zealand ethnologist and mountain climber (1891–1982)

Dora Hallenstein de Beer
- Born: September 8, 1891; Melbourne, Australia
- Died: 1982 (aged 90–91); London, England
- Education: Girton College; University of Otago
- Occupations: Ethnologist, mountaineer
- Relatives: Esmond de Beer (brother); Bendix Hallenstein (grandparent)

Dora Hallenstein de Beer (1891–1982) was an ethnologist, mountaineer and philanthropist. She was born in Melbourne, Australia; was brought up in Dunedin, New Zealand; and died in London, England in 1982.

== Biography ==
Dora Hallenstein de Beer was born on 8 September 1891, the younger sister of Mary de Beer. They came from an extended family of merchants who had made a fortune in the prosperous years during and after the Otago gold rush. Their parents were Isidore Samuel de Beer and Emily Hallenstein; Bendix Hallenstein was one of their grandparents. The family moved from St Kilda, Australia to Dunedin, New Zealand in 1893 where her brothers Esmond de Beer and Bendix were born, Bendix was killed in action during WW1.

She attended Dunedin's Girton College. Her father was based in the UK for a period from 1910, so that he could manage the Hallenstein company's affairs in London, her brothers were schooled in the UK and Dora travelled to the Europe on occasion in the 1920s but her home base continued to be in Dunedin until after the death of her mother there in 1930. It was only after that, in 1932, that Dora and her sister Mary moved to the UK permanently, shortly before her father died there in 1934. The move to London gave Dora the opportunity to climb more in the French, Italian and Swiss Alps.

== Ethnology ==
By 1920 she had become the first woman to complete H.D. Skinner's anthropology course at the University of Otago, and was awarded a "Certificate in anthropology". Working with Skinner, she catalogued the New Guinea material in the Otago collection and soon after that she travelled to Europe, carrying Skinner's letter of introduction to Alfred Cort Haddon, who was a specialist in the material culture of New Guinea and who was then based at the Museum of Archaeology and Anthropology, University of Cambridge. She also visited various archaeological sites whilst in Europe; later, back in New Zealand, she gave lectures relating to those visits.

In 1930, Dora and her sister Mary were commissioned by the Māori Ethnological Research Board to translate into English Augustin Krämer's study of Samoan culture, ‘Die Samoa Inseln’.

In the 1950s she was asked by Skinner to identify examples of Italian Renaissance maiolica and of English delftware that the Otago Museum could purchase for their ceramics collection.

She was elected as a fellow of Royal Anthropological Institute in 1922. She became a member of the Polynesian Society in 1924 and contributed book reviews and articles to the society journal. In 1934 she was the Otago museum delegate to the 1st International Congress on Anthropological and Ethnologicial Sciences held in London.

== Mountaineering ==
De Beer climbed extensively in New Zealand, her first recorded visit to the Southern Alps was in 1915 with her elder brother, Bendix. She spent a further six seasons there between 1920 and the early 1930s before she moved to England. After she settled in the UK she climbed extensively in the European Alps and returned several times to New Zealand, climbing on those trips too, overall her climbing "earned her a definite place in the history" of the New Zealand Alpine Club.

In 1935 Una Cameron and De Beer made the first female ascent of the complete Peuterey integrale. Other notable climbs in the European Alps included Mont Blanc by the Brenva Ridge-Maudit traverse in 1936, a traverse of the Grandes Jorasses and a number of ascents in the Dolomites which were "regarded as difficult by the standards of her time".

She made the second ascent of Mt. Hooker in New Zealand's Westland range in March 1937, with Marion Scott, Joe Fluerty and Chris Pope. They made a flight around the mountain before the attempt and used a plane to reach the junction of the Landsborough and Clarke rivers. A four day journey had to be made on foot from the landing site before they were able to start the climbing proper, they ascended by the north-west-ridge.

In 1938 she took part in an expedition to Yunnan, Western China, the party of six which was led by Marie Byles also included Mick Bowie, Marjorie Edgar-Jones. The expedition's objective was an ascent of Mt Satseto 5,596 m (18,360 ft), the highest point of the Jade Dragon Snow Mountain massif, (Note: footnote 1 explains the several different spellings used for Mt Satseto and its environs) near the Tibetan border. The approach "took forty two days and crossed some of the greatest rivers in Asia, the Irawaddy, the Salween, the Mekong and the Yangtze". Due to poor weather, the expedition failed to reach the summit, the first successful ascent of the mountain was not made until 1988.

Byles, Bowie and Edgar-Jones left for home after the unsuccessful attempt on Mt Satseto but the remaining members of the party, including de Beer, travelled through sections of the Yangtse gorge and on 2 December made a successful ascent of Geena Nkoo.

She was elected as a member of Royal Geographical Society in 1934 and was elected president of the Ladies' Alpine Club for 1970–1971.

== Literary connections and philanthropy ==
De Beer was close to her mother's cousin, the poet Charles Brasch, he wrote that after his mother's death in 1914 "Mary and Dora de Beer were as close to me almost as my two aunts".

Brasch along with Dora, her sister Mary and brother Esmond endowed the Robert Burns Fellowship in 1958. At the time they made the donation anonymously, but in later years their identities became known. Before their donation the state Literary Fund was the only writer's fellowship available in New Zealand. Brasch and the de Beers would later establish music and painting fellowships at Otago University.

Many other gifts were made to institutions in the name of the three siblings Esmond, Dora and Mary, the beneficiaries included Dunedin's museum and art gallery and the University of Otago.
