= Joyce Dunsheath =

English mountaineer, traveller, explorer and writer

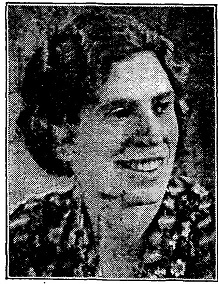
- Mrs. Joyce Dunsheath in 1956
- Born: Cissie Providence Houchen; 8 November 1902; Heigham, Norwich, England
- Died: 30 July 1976 (aged 74)
- Known for: mountaineering, exploration
- Parents: Charles Houchen (father); Gertrude Providence (mother)

Joyce Dunsheath (8 November 1902 – 30 July 1976), née Cissie Providence Houchen, was an English mountaineer, traveller, explorer and writer.

== Personal life ==
Born in Heigham, near Norwich, she was the daughter of Charles Houchen, insurance clerk, and Gertrude Providence, née Balls.

She married in 1938 Percy Dunsheath (1886–1979). He was a renowned electrical engineer and writer and a widower. Joyce had met him during a skiing holiday in the Austrian Alps. She and Percy shared a love for travel, mountaineering and exploration. They made their home at St Paul, Abinger Hammer, Surrey.

Dunsworth was a keen Girl Guide member. During WWII she was district commissioner for Poplar and in Surrey, where she also ran a Brownie pack. She subsequently became division commissioner and chair of the training committee for Streatham.

== Education & awards ==
She obtained a Degree in Modern Languages at Bedford College, University of London, in 1924. She was a member of the Alpine Club from 1951. In 1956 she was elected a Fellow of the Royal Geographical Society, serving in its council from 1965 to 1968. She also took a BSc degree when in her sixties, and an A-level Russian.

== Climbing and exploration ==
In 1956 she set off to explore the Himalayas in an expedition together with Eileen Gregory, biochemist, and Frances Delaney, geologist, and Hilda Reid, nurse. The target was the little known mountainous territory in the Kulu district of East Punjab. Driving all the way the 9000 miles from her home in Surrey was an exploration in itself, she managed to reach Manali, the "Darjeeling" of the Kulu district in seven weeks. Thanks to a grant of £500 from the Everest Foundation, she was able to survey thoroughly the Bara Shigri Glacier, by means of plane-table and panoramic camera, in order to compile subsequently a detailed map based on her detailed processing of her photographs and figures. In July 1957 she climbed the highest mountain in Europe, the 18,000 feet high, snow-capped Mount Elbrus, in the Caucasus region, walking through its western, central regions, and in Svanetia, Georgia. The whole area had been shut to the public since the Russian Revolution, and she was able to access it thanks to an invitation from the deputy Minister of Electric Power Stations, who had been in touch with her husband Percy about organizing an international electro-technical conference in Russia.

In 1961, she climbed Mount Damavand in Afghanistan. The account of her journey and her companion Eleanor Baillie in this expedition can be read on her published book Afghan Quest (Harrap, 1961).

In 1964 she was invited by Bharat Scouts and Guides' Association to lead a team of six Indian women, aged between 18 and 31, to climb Mount Mrigthuni, 22,490 feet high, between the frontiers of Tibet and Nepal, in the Garhwal Himalayas. Following the successful ascent of Mount Everest by Sherpa Tensing in the team led by Sir John Hunt's in 1953, there was a very active interest in climbing in India, with climbing courses becoming very popular. The expedition was successful, and "would make the path easier in all senses for future generations of Indian women".

She also climbed in the Japanese Alps, the Canadian Rockies, visited the Peruvian Andes in 1965, and in 1973 she added Mount Kilimanjaro and Mount Kenya to her list of successful climbs.

== Publications ==
Her accounts and memories were published in three books:

- Mountains and Memsahibs, 1956 with the other members of the expedition to the Bara-Shigri glacier
- Guest of the Soviets, 1959
- Afghan Quest, 1961

Together with a number of articles in the Ladies Alpine Club Journal.

== Legacy ==
She was a paladin of a conception of mountaineering in its purest sense, free from professionalism and competition, and she petitioned passionately to promote her views. According to her, the right approach to it was to regard it as "a sport to be enjoyed ... to harden the body and learn the skills which will make for success ... each one matching her own strength against the strength of the mountain ... involving the whole man, physical, mental and spiritual ... those gaining the summit know that the spirit of the hill is not of this world".
