= Brede (name) =

Brede is both a surname and a masculine Norwegian given name. Notable people with the name include:

Surname:

- Anita Schjøll Brede (born 1985), Norwegian entrepreneur
- Ardell Brede (born 1939), American politician
- Brent Brede (born 1971), American baseball player
- Herbert Brede (1888–1942), Estonian general
- Krzysztof Brede (born 1981), Polish footballer

Given name:

- Brede Arkless (1939–2006), British rock climber
- Brede Bomhoff (born 1976), Norwegian footballer
- Brede Frettem Csiszar (born 1987), Norwegian ice hockey player
- Brede Hangeland (born 1981), Norwegian footballer
