= Irmgard Braun =

German rock climber and crime writer

Imgard Braun
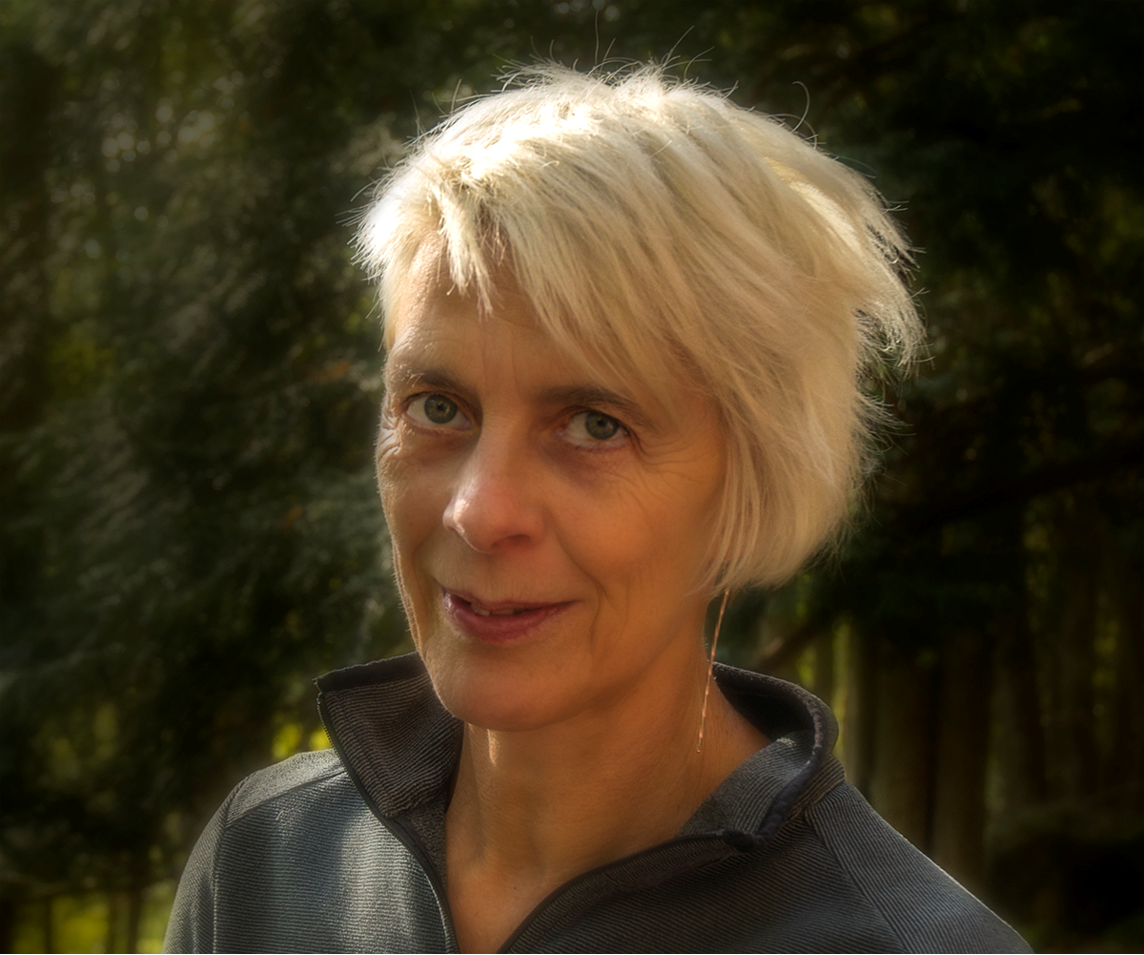
- Born: February 24, 1952 (age 74); Munich
- Occupations: Author and sport climber
- Organization: Rendez-vous Hautes Montagnes
- Known for: Climbing 5.12c (7b+) climb at 72 years old
- Notable work: Tod an der Alpspitze: Garmisch-Krimi; Nie wieder tot: Mord am Gardasee
- Spouse: Andreas "Andi" Dick
- Children: 1
- Website: www.irmgard-braun.de

Irmgard Braun (born February 25, 1952 in Munich) is a German rock climber who specialized in competition climbing and sport climbing, and an author of climbing-themed crime thrillers.

== Life ==
Braun grew up in Baden-Württemberg and became a high school teacher. She began climbing in her thirties, and by the 1980s she was recognized as one of Germany's best sport climbers. She made several first free ascents in the Upper Danube Valley (e.g. Kater Garfield at VIII in 1984) and also alpine climbing routes such as the North Face of Les Droites and the Solleder Route on Monte Civetta.

Following a knee injury, she began focusing on shorter routes and competed as a German National competition climbing team member in national and international competitions. As a member, she won first place at the Stuttgart Sport Climbing Cup in 1991.

She stopped teaching to move to Munich to become an editor for Alpin-Magazin. Later, she started work as an editor for various publications for the media conglomerate Süddeutscher Verlag. In 2014, she published her first climbing-themed crime novel, Never dead again - Murder on Lake Garda.

Braun has continued to climb as she has grown older, and has become a role model for older climbers. At age 53, she climbed her first 7c+.

In 2017, she had a serious wrist fracture and worried she would be unable to climb. She recovered and started a new project, "Project 9" when she was 66 to encourage older climbers to keep climbing.

She encourages older climbers to continue to challenge themselves and advocates for elderly climbers to prevent injury and to be unafraid of falling, despite their age.

In 2021, Braun gained notoriety for climbing the sport climbing route Open Box at 5.12d (7c) when she was 69 years old.

In 2024, at age 72, she climbed Le String a Fredo at 5.12d (7c) at Gorges du Tarn. The feat was made more notable due to the fact she had been hit by a car the year before and had taken months to recover from knee surgery.

== Books ==
- Non Fiction:
  - Climbing - but safely : Basic knowledge of sport climbing and bouldering (in German:„Klettern – aber sicher“: Basiswissen zum Sportklettern und Bouldern), Co-authored by Gerd Heidorn, Südwest-Verlag, Münich 2006, ISBN 978-3517069753
- Novels:
  - Irmgard Braun: Never dead again – Murder on Lake Garda (In German: Nie wieder tot – Mord am Gardasee), Bergverlag Rother, München 2014, ISBN 978-3-7633-7067-2
  - Irmgard Braun: Brave but dead – Murder on the Gardena Pass (In German: Mutig, aber tot – Mord am Grödner Joch), Bergverlag Rother, München 2015, ISBN 978-3-7633-7070-2
  - Irmgard Braun: Missing – Monika Trautner's 1st case (In German: Vermisst – Monika Trautners 1. Fall), Bergverlag Rother, München 2016, ISBN 978-3-7633-7077-1
  - Irmgard Braun: Betrayed – Monika Trautner's 2nd case (In German: Verraten – Monika Trautners 2. Fall), Bergverlag Rother, München 2017, ISBN 978-3-7633-7078-8
  - Irmgard Braun: Death at the Alpspitze (In German: Tod an der Alpspitze), Bergverlag Rother, München 2018, ISBN 978-3-7633-7080-1

== See also ==
- Rendez-vous Hautes Montagnes, women's climbing club of which Braun is an active member
