= Esmond de Beer =

New Zealand scholar (1895–1990)

Esmond Samuel de Beer (15 September 1895 – 3 October 1990) was a New Zealand scholar, editor, collector, bibliophile and philanthropist. He was born in Dunedin, Otago, on 15 September 1895.

De Beer was the grandson of Dunedin businessman Bendix Hallenstein, founder of Hallenstein Bros., a major New Zealand retailer, and nephew of avid collector Willi Fels, from whom he developed a love of books. The De Beers moved to London in 1910 when Esmond's father Isidore was made manager of Hallensteins' London office. He was educated at Mill Hill School, and in 1914 entered New College, Oxford, to read History. After serving on India's Northwest Frontier during the First World War, he returned home to gain an MA at the University of London in 1923.

De Beer worked as an editor for Clarendon Press, working on two massive and time-consuming projects, first the diary of John Evelyn (six volumes, published in 1955) and then the correspondence of John Locke. The latter work, published in eight volumes between 1976 and 1989, was left uncompleted at the time of De Beer's death. In addition, he published more than 150 articles and notices.

Though spending much of their life in England, De Beer and his sisters Mary and Dora always regarded New Zealand as their home, and were major benefactors of Dunedin's museums and libraries, most notably to the University of Otago Library, which was the recipient of Esmond's collection of rare books. In a paper presented to the Bibliographical Society of Australia and New Zealand, Donald Kerr provided an overview of the scope of de Beer's book collecting.

The De Beers and cousin Charles Brasch were also driving forces behind the inauguration of the university's three arts fellowships: the Robert Burns Fellowship (writing), the Frances Hodgkins Fellowship (art), and the Mozart Fellowship (music). De Beer was instrumental in helping the Otago Museum's quest to acquire much of the art collected by his aunt Agnes Barden. Numerous other gifts were given to both of these institutions and to the Dunedin Public Art Gallery. The Dunedin Public Library was gifted with over 100 rare books, including many first editions of the works of Sir Walter Scott. De Beer also contributed to the library of the University of Essex, the Bodleian Library and others.

De Beer was a major figure in several notable institutions, including the (British) Historical Association, of which he was vice-president, and the Institute of Historical Research. He served as president of the Hakluyt Society, and was a trustee of the National Portrait Gallery. He was named a fellow of the British Academy in 1965, received a similar honour from University College, London, two years later, and was awarded honorary doctorates by the Universities of Otago, Oxford and Durham.

De Beer died in a nursing home in Stoke Hammond, Buckinghamshire on 3 October 1990, aged 95. Much of his correspondence, and that of his sisters (who predeceased him during the 1980s), is held by the Hocken Collections.
