= Beatrice McAndrew =

English mountain climber (1870/1–1970)

Beatrice M. McAndrew (1870/1–1970) was an English mountain climber who served as Hon Secretary and President of the Ladies’ Alpine Club from 1913 to 1940.

McAndrew began alpine climbing in 1906, and went climbing in the Alps every year between then and 1914, often with her cousin Freda Westhall (who married fellow climber Sergei Merriman). She and Freda became members of the Ladies’ Alpine Club in 1910 on the recommendation of Alpine Club members they met at Hôtel Bricolla. McAndrew became Hon Secretary in 1913, remaining in that post until 1936, and was elected President in 1938–40. In 1939, McAndrew completed her last recorded climb, the Allalinhorn. She continued attending Ladies’ Alpine Club annual dinners until she was 97.

McAndrew, who was reportedly only 4ft 10 in height, was an amateur watercolourist of mountain scenery and cultivated mountain flowers in her garden in Chislehurst.

She died, at the age of 99, on 24 January 1970.
