= Eleanor Winthrop Young =

British mountaineer (1895–1994)

Eleanor "Len" Winthrop Young
- Born: Eleanor Slingsby; July 8, 1895; Carleton-in-Craven, West Riding of Yorkshire, England
- Died: January 1994 (aged 98); Norfolk, England
- Occupation: Climber
- Known for: Ascents in Britain and in the Alps. Co-founded a club for women rock climbers, the Pinnacle Club
- Notable work: In Praise of Mountains, 1948
- Spouse: Geoffrey Winthrop Young (m. 1918; died 1958)
- Children: Jocelin Winthrop Young; Marcia Winthrop Young
- Father: William Cecil Slingsby

Eleanor "Len" Winthrop Young (1895–1994) was a British climber. She was a co-founder and the first president of the Pinnacle Club, a British women's climbing club, and made numerous ascents in the Alps and many in the United Kingdom.

== Early life ==
Eleanor Slingsby was born in 1895 in Carleton-in-Craven, West Riding of Yorkshire. She was the youngest of five children born to William Cecil Slingsby (1849–1929), a mill owner and climber with extensive experience in Norway who became known as "the father of Norwegian mountaineering". Slingsby introduced each of his children to climbing at a young age around their local village.

In 1902, aged seven, Eleanor first met English mountaineer Geoffrey Winthrop Young (1876–1958) at her home in Carleton-in-Craven. She married him in 1918; by that time, he had lost a leg in the war and she helped him to regain his climbing abilities with an artificial leg. At the end of 1924 they moved to Cambridge with their son Jocelin who had been born on 25 October 1919. A daughter named Marcia was born on 11 March 1925, she went on to marry Peter Newbolt, the grandson of Sir Henry John Newbolt.

== Climbing career ==
Winthrop Young first visited Norway with her father in 1921, on a climbing expedition that made her "ecstatic". The same year, she co-founded the Pinnacle Club, a club for women rock climbers that she felt would "serve the double purpose of promoting the independent development of the climbing art amongst women and of bringing into touch with one another those who are already united by the bond of common love for a noble sport". She served as the club's first president, and its inaugural meeting was at the Welsh pass Pen-y-Gwryd on 26 March 1921. An article published in the Alpine Journal after Winthrop Young's death noted that she had earned "her own special place in mountaineering history" for her involvement with the Pinnacle Club. She was on the committee of the Norwegian Alpine Club and the Fell & Rock Climbing Club.

Winthrop Young's climbing record included many ascents in Britain as well as several trips to the Alps, usually with her husband. Among these climbs in the Alps was a "spectacular" traverse of the Hohstock made by Eleanor, Geoffrey and Jocelin with a mountain guide in 1931. She also ascended the Rimpfischhorn in the same year. With a guide, she made the first ascent of the southernmost peak of the Fusshörner.

== Published works ==
Winthrop Young edited her father's book, Norway: the Northern Playground (1941), to which her husband appended a biographical sketch of Slingsby. The couple also co-wrote a 1948 book, In Praise of Mountains.

== Death ==
Winthrop Young in later life moved from Marlborough, Wiltshire to a nursing home in Norfolk, to be nearer to her daughter Marcia, where she died in late January 1994.
