= Claude Kogan =

French mountain climber (1919–1959)

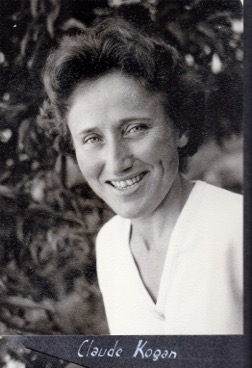
Kogan in 1959 in Nepal

Claude Kogan (1919–1959) (née Trouillet) was a French mountaineer who, after climbing a number of peaks in South America, turned to the Himalayas. After notable feats such as the first ascent of Nun (7,135 m (23,409 ft)), she died in October 1959 while leading a women-only expedition to climb Cho Oyu, the sixth-highest mountain in the world, on the China Tibet–Nepal Province No. 1 border.

== Biography ==
Kogan was born in Paris in 1919. Born to a poor mother, she quit school at 15 and got a job as a seamstress. Her first climbing experience was in the Ardennes of Belgium. She moved to Nice during the German occupation of France where she had a business designing women's swimwear, with Christian Dior as one of her clients. There she met and married mountaineer George Kogan, who was the first to introduce her to climbing. Following the war, the couple became members of the Groupe de Haute Montagne and climbed Chamonix, Dauphiné, the north face of the Dru, and the south ridge of the Aiguille Noire de Peuterey. In the early 1950s she and her husband climbed in South America and claimed the first ascent of Alpamayo, and also reached the summit of Kitarahu (both with Nicole Leiniger). Her husband died in 1951, but Kogan returned to South America in 1952 and climbed Salcantay with the expedition led by Bernard Pierre.

In 1953, she climbed Nun, 7,135 metres (23,409 ft), in India in a Pierre-led expedition, summiting with Pierre Vittoz after the other climbers had been caught by avalanches. In the American press, the newspapers reported on her as a "Paris dress designer" who realized the "dream of every mountaineer". Reaching the top of Nun gave Kogan the record for the highest summit attained by a female mountaineer until then.

=== Cho Oyu expedition and death ===
Media related to 1959 women-only international expedition to climb Cho Oyu at Wikimedia Commons

The expedition to Cho Oyu in 1959 was noteworthy not just because it consisted only of female climbers but also because it was international: besides the French Kogan, the team also included Loulou Boulaz from Switzerland, Dorothea Gravina, Margaret Darvall and Eileen Healey from the UK, the Belgian Claudine van der Straten-Ponthoz, and the French mountaineers Jeanne Franco, Colette LeBret and Micheline Rambaud. Amongst the Nepali members were Tenzing's daughters Nima and Pem-Pem and his niece Dhoma. In 1954, Kogan, with Raymond Lambert, had been forced to turn back 500 meters from the summit, and she was eager to prove herself.

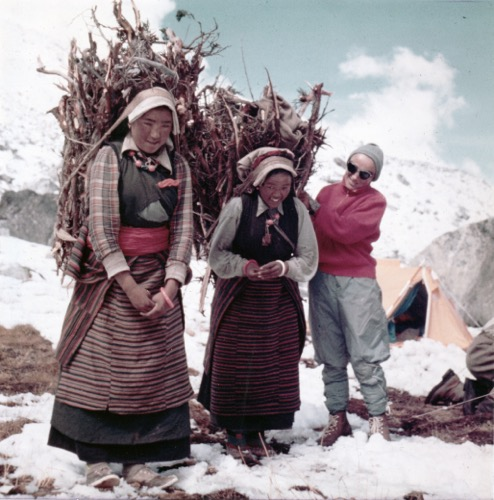
Kogan and two porters in Nepal in 1959

Kogan and van der Straten-Ponthoz and two Sherpa porters perished in an avalanche. Dorothea Gravina then took charge of the expedition.

== Ascents and attempts ==
- Aiguille du Dru, north face, 1946
- Alpamayo, claimed first ascent, 1951
- Kitarahu, second ascent, 1951
- Salcantay, first ascent, 1952
- Nun, first ascent, 1953
- Yangra in Ganesh Himal, first ascent, 1955

== See also ==
- List of deaths on eight-thousanders
