= Pinnacle Club =

UK rock climbing club for women

The Pinnacle Club is a women's rock climbing club based in the United Kingdom, founded in 1921.

== History ==
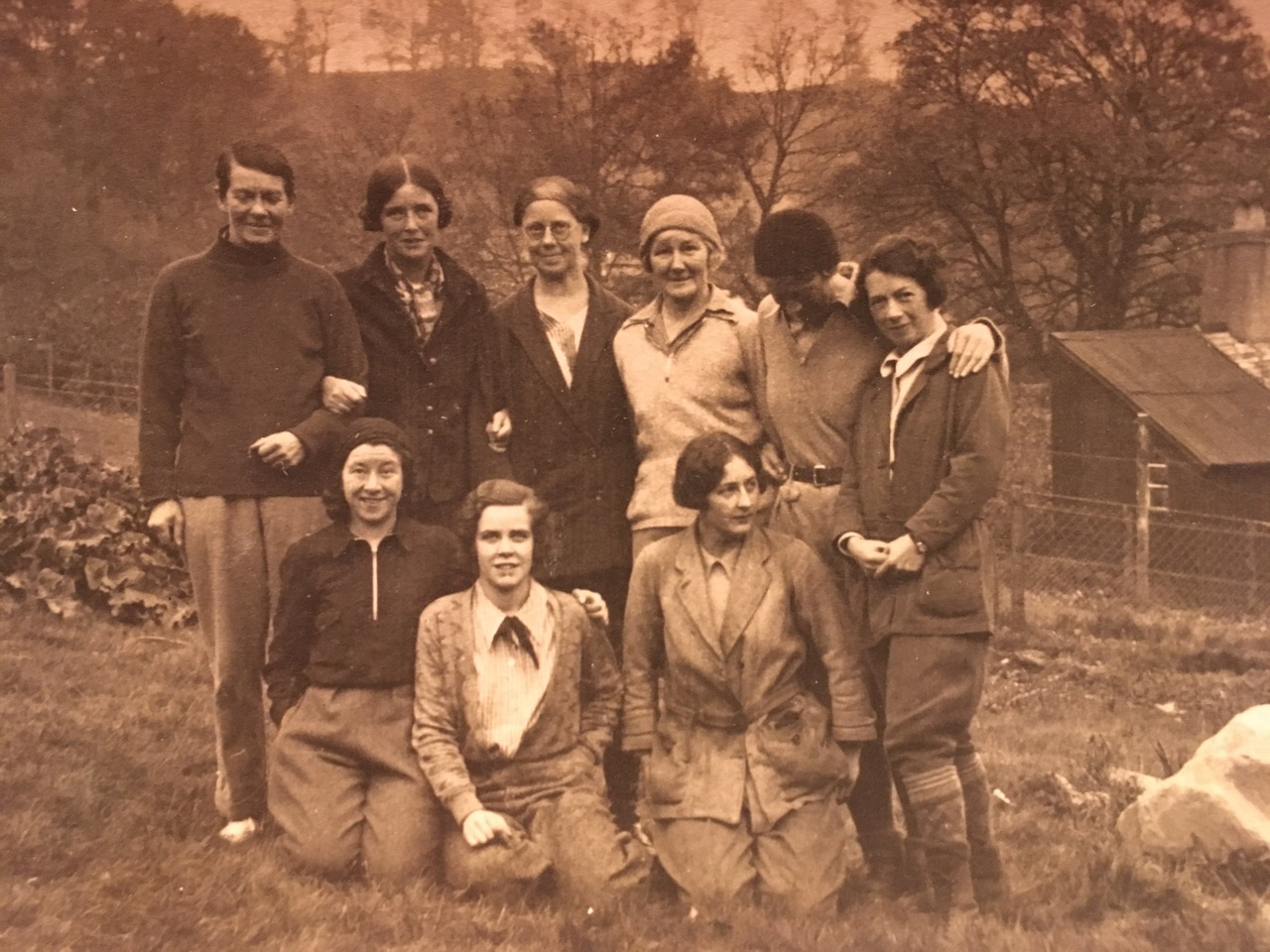
Pinnacle Club members (photo taken in Coniston, the Lake District, 1933)

The Pinnacle Club – the UK's only national rock-climbing club for women – was founded in 1921 by Emily Kelly (known as Pat).

In the 1920s, although increasing numbers of women were coming to climbing, they remained a minority. Though the Fell & Rock Climbing Club, established in 1906 for Lake District climbing, was open to both men and women, women were excluded from most climbing clubs. Women still tended to be viewed as secondary partners, with men predominantly taking the lead. The Pinnacle Club was founded to offer an alternative – a space where women could literally 'learn the ropes' together. Although the Ladies' Alpine Club and Ladies' Scottish Climbing Club had been set up in 1907 and 1908 respectively, they were focused on mountaineering. The Pinnacle Club, by contrast, was primarily about rock climbing. Its objectives were – and remain – to "foster the independent development of rock climbing amongst women and bring together those interested in the pursuit".

The club was inaugurated on March 26, 1921, at a meeting in the Pen-y-Gwryd Inn, just below Pen-y-Pass in Snowdonia. The club began with 43 members, with Pat Kelly as Club Secretary and Eleanor Winthrop Young as president. A letter was published in the Manchester Guardian soon afterwards, advertising the club's existence and asking interested women to contact Pat Kelly. She died the following year following a climbing accident in North Wales, but the club continued.

The club organised weekend or week-long 'meets' around the UK, where members could come together to climb. Early venues included North Wales, the Lake District, Skye, the Yorkshire Dales and the Peak District. In 1921, there were nine meets in the calendar – in 2019 (before the COVID pandemic), there were 26. From the start, members also regularly climbed abroad, many having extensive Alpine experience and achieving many Alpine first female ascents. Today members continue to travel throughout Europe and beyond, enjoying all types of climbing: sport, trad and mountaineering.

By 1945, the club had just under 100 members, and this growth continued through the following decades. The club in 2021 has 170 members, the youngest in their 20s and the oldest in their 90s. Eminent climbers who have been members over the years include Nea Morin, Dorothy Pilley, Brede Arkless, Jill Lawrence, Eileen Healey, Gwen Moffat and Angela Soper.

== International Events ==
The first international event held in Llanberis in 1984 saw the first female ascent of an E5 by Jill Lawrence. In 2016 a second event was held with over eighty climbers of all standards, from making their first traditional climb to climbing E7.

== Presidents ==
- 1921–1923: Eleanor Winthrop-Young (1895–1994)
- 1932–1933 & 1935–1936: Dorothy Pilley (1894–1986)
- 1963–1964 Dorothea Gravina (1905–1990)
- 1965–1966 Margaret Darvall (1911–1996)
