= Brede Arkless =

British rock climber

Brede Arkless (née Boyle) (10 August 1939 – 18 March 2006) was a British female rock climber and mountaineer, and was actively involved in the all-women's climbing movement.

== Life and family ==
She was born in Manchester, England, of Dublin parents, and was brought up in Ireland, to which her parents had returned quickly after the outbreak of war only three weeks after her birth.

== Climbing ==
From an early age she showed a passion for the outdoors. As a teenager, having left school at 14, she was happiest wandering around the Wicklow Mountains, where she first saw rock climbers in action on the cliffs at Glendalough; she started climbing herself at Dalkey Quarry. By the early 1960s, and in her early twenties, Brede Boyle was working in North Wales as a climbing instructor for the Mountaineering Association.

In 1964 she married fellow mountaineer Geoff Arkless, and together they started a climbing school in Wales. She made several all-women trips to the greater ranges, while still being able to rear eight children (four boys and two daughters with Geoff, and, after their separation in the mid-1970s, two daughters with another Llanberis-based climber, Mick Pointon). She also organised women-only climbing courses, together with the noted climber and feminist Jill Lawrence. She was only the second woman to qualify, in the 1960s, as a British Mountain Guide (after Gwen Moffat), and was the first woman to hold the badge of the UIAGM as an international mountain guide. Increasingly involved in all-women climbing and guiding, she eventually separated from her husband, moved to New Zealand in September 1990 and became a New Zealand citizen in 1995. While in her fifties she guided a total of 22 ascents of Aoraki / Mount Cook, the highest mountain in New Zealand.

In 1998, an expedition party of five, including a 59-year-old Arkless, succeeded in crossing the Garhwal region of the Indian Himalayas between the Hindu temples of Badrinath and Kedarnath, a feat that had only been accomplished once before, in 1934. In 2000 Arkless tried to become the oldest woman to ascend Mount Everest, but failed when she had to abandon her attempt at 8,500 m (28,000 ft) due to severe altitude sickness. The experience left her disillusioned: "Everest is full of non-climbers and rich people. Everest is all about summit fever and people who shouldn't be where they are. One guy said 'How many 8000m peaks have you climbed?' When I said 'One', he turned away."

Arkless died of pancreatic cancer, aged 66. After being diagnosed, Arkless rode her bicycle more than 150 miles over high mountain passes from her home in Twizel to a hospital in Christchurch for exploratory surgery, which revealed that her illness was inoperable.

Brede Arkless is commemorated in the naming of an outdoor activities centre in East London. Run as a social enterprise by Newham-based charity Community Links, "The Brede Arkless Outdoors in the City Centre" recognises "...the inspirational way in which Brede introduced disadvantaged and often disaffected children and young people safely into the challenges and joy of the mountains".
