= Gross Fusshorn =

Mountain in Switzerland

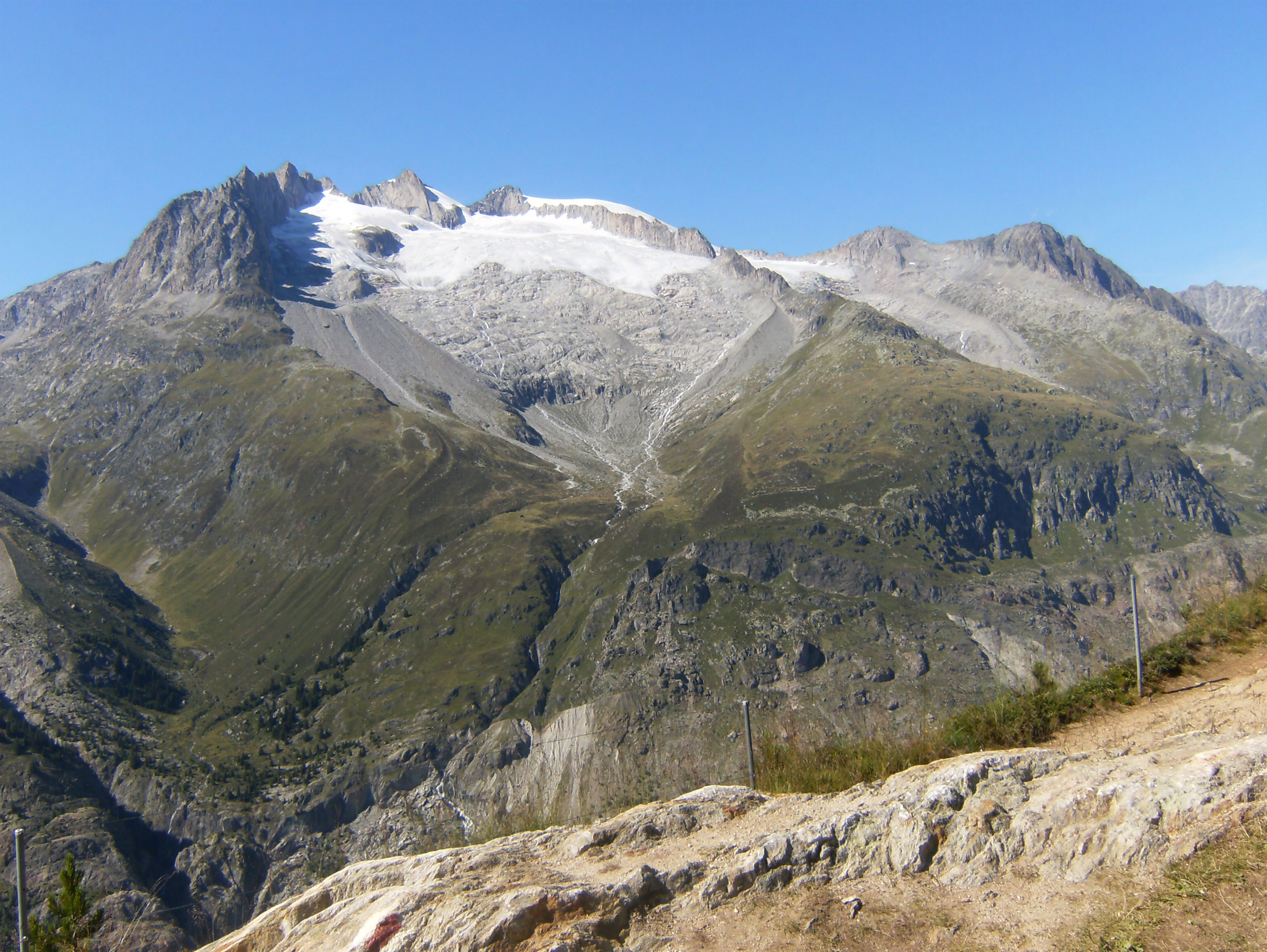
- The Gross Fusshorn (left) and the Geisshorn (centre-left) from the south side

Highest point
- Elevation: 3,627 m (11,900 ft)
- Prominence: 122 m (400 ft)
- Parent peak: Aletschhorn
- Coordinates: 46°25′49.3″N 7°59′52.8″E

Geography
- Location within Switzerland
- Location: Valais, Switzerland
- Parent range: Bernese Alps

The Gross Fusshorn is a mountain of the Bernese Alps, overlooking the Oberaletsch Glacier in the canton of Valais. The Fusshörner are a group of peaks located on the south ridge of the Gross Fusshorn. On the east side lies a glacier named Driestgletscher.

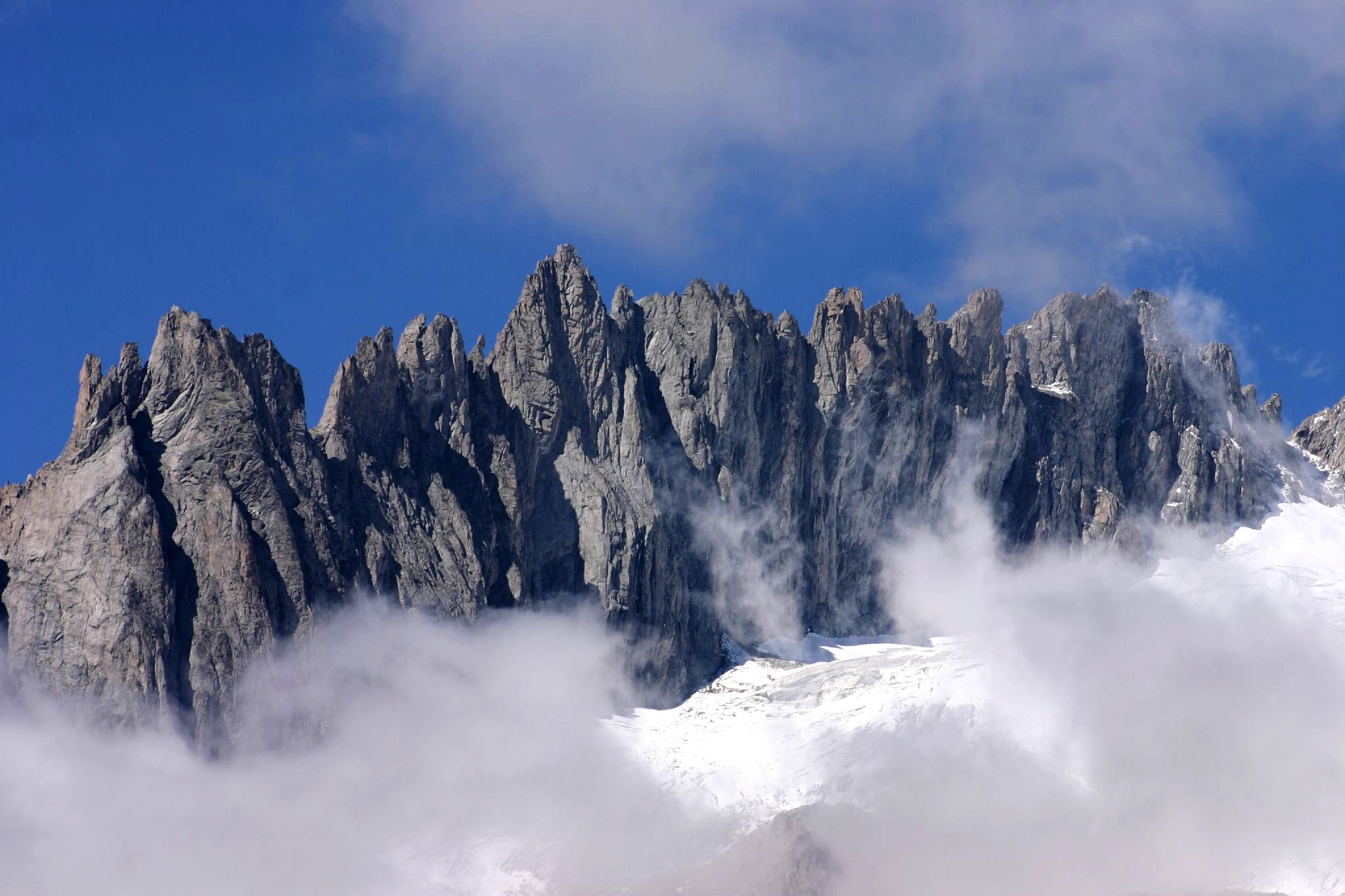
The Fusshörner on the southern ridge
