= Shafat Glacier =

Glacier in Ladakh, India

Shafat Glacier Parkachik Glacier
- Location within Ladakh Location within India
- Type: Mountain glacier
- Location: Himalaya Range, Zanskar Range, Kargil, Ladakh
- Coordinates: 33°59′54″N 76°08′10″E
- Length: 14 kilometres (9 mi)

The Shafat Glacier — Parkachik Glacier is a 14 kilometres (9 mi) long glacier in the Himalayan Range in Ladakh, India.

== Geography ==
It is situated 85 kilometres (53 mi) south from Kargil and 294 kilometres (183 mi) east from Srinagar on the right side of Kargil — Zanskar Road near the border of the union territories of Jammu and Kashmir and Ladakh in India.

The Shafat Glacier — Parkachik Glacier gives rise to the two mountain peaks of Nun and Kun which have an elevation of more than 6800 meters, and it provides a base to climb these mountain peaks. It lies at an average elevation of 4400 meters. The melt waters add to the flow of the Suru River which is a tributary of the Indus River.

The Shafat Glacier/Parkachik Glacier is a broken, ice falling glacier melting at an alarming rate due to the Global warming,
