= Dorothy Perry Thompson =

American poet, educator, scholar, teacher and activist (1944–2002)

- Born: June 25, 1944; Springfield, South Carolina, USA
- Died: January 4, 2002 (aged 57); Rock Hill, South Carolina, USA
- Spouse: Johnnie Thompson
- Children: 3

Academic background
- Education: Allen University (BA, 1968); University of South Carolina (MA, 1974; PhD, 1987)
- Thesis: Wheeler Hill and Other Poems
- Academic advisor: James Dickey

Academic work
- Institutions: Winthrop College

Dorothy Perry Thompson (née Perry; 1944—2002) was an American poet, educator, scholar, teacher and activist. She was the second African American person to receive a doctorate in English from the University of South Carolina, as well as the university's first African American person to complete a creative writing dissertation. She later taught English at Winthrop College and helped establish and coordinate the university's African American Studies program.

== Early life and education ==
Dorothy Perry was born in Springfield, South Carolina in 1944 and grew up in the Wheeler neighborhood of Columbia, South Carolina, with her five siblings. Her mother was a laundress, and her father was a carpenter. She graduated from Booker T. Washington High School in 1962.

Thompson received a Bachelor of Arts in English from Allen University (1968), then attended the University of South Carolina, receiving a Master of Arts in teaching (1974) and a Doctor of Philosophy (1987) under the supervision of American poet and novelist James Dickey. Upon graduating, Thompson became the second African American person at the university to receive a doctorate in English, as well as the university's first African American person to complete a creative writing dissertation.

== Career ==
Thompson started her career as a public school teacher. From 1974 to 1985, Thompson taught at various public schools, including Riverside High School, Lower Richland High School, and Dreher High School.

Thompson joined Winthrop College in 1985. In 1990, she suggested that the university establish a minor in African American Studies. She later became the first professor hired to teach in the discipline. She became a full professor of English in 2001. At the time of her death in 2002, she taught in the university's English department and coordinated the African American Studies program.

As a writer, Thompson published her first collection of poems, Fly with the Puffin, in 1995. This collection was followed by Priest in Aqua Boa (2001) and Hurrying the Spirit: Following Zora (2002), as well as the 2001 anthology Out of the Rough. Her poetry explores themes relating to race, gender, and community.

In 2000, Creative Loafing named her "The Best Poet In Charlotte." Also, in 2001, she was nominated for the Poet Laureate of South Carolina.

== Personal life ==
Dorothy Perry Thompson married Johnnie C. Thompson, who had also graduated from Booker T. Washington High School in 1962. The couple had three children.

Throughout her life, she was known as "The Bard of Wheeler Hill", which was a nod to her Columbia neighborhood where she grew up, and later was an influence in multiple of her works.

Thompson died of breast cancer in Rock Hill, South Carolina on January 4, 2002.

== Selected works ==
- "Africana Womanism", 1992
- Fly with the Puffin, 1995
- "Daddy Saved in Snatches: The Quilting," 1997
- Priest in Aqua Boa, 2001
- Out of The Rough, 2001
- Hurrying the Spirit: Following Zora, 2002
