= Dorothy Thompson (businesswoman) =

British businesswoman (born 1960)

- Born: Dorothy Carrington Thompson; November 1960 (age 65)
- Education: London School of Economics
- Occupations: Chairman, Tullow Oil
- Board member of: Tullow Oil; Eaton Corporation plc

Dorothy Carrington Thompson CBE (born 18 November 1960) is a British businesswoman; until 2017 she was CEO of Drax Group, a FTSE 250 Index electrical power generation company, and is now non-executive chairman of Tullow Oil, and a director of Eaton Corporation plc.

== Early life ==
Dorothy Carrington Thompson was born on 18 November 1960. She received a BSc (1983) and MSc in Economics from the London School of Economics.

== Career ==
She was CEO of Drax Group from September 2005 to December 2017. Prior to joining Drax, she was assistant group treasurer for Powergen plc, and before that, head of European business at InterGen NV.

In August 2014, she was appointed a non-executive director of the Bank of England.

== Honours ==
In the 2014 Birthday Honours, she was made a Commander of the Order of the British Empire.

== Personal life ==
Thompson is married with two children.
