= Dorothy Pilley Richards =

British mountain climber (1894–1986)

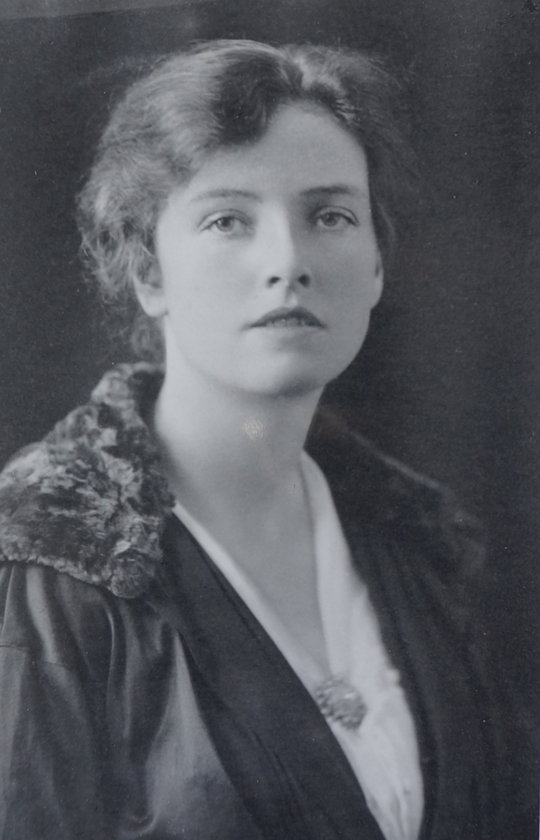
- Dorothy Pilley – Secretary of the British Women's Patriotic League, c. 1922
- Born: Dorothy Eleanor Pilley; 16 September 1894; Camberwell, South London, England
- Died: 24 September 1986 (aged 92); Cambridge, Cambridgeshire, England
- Occupation(s): Mountaineer, writer
- Notable work: Climbing Days (1935)
- Spouse: I. A. Richards (m. 1926; died 1979)

Dorothy Pilley Richards (16 September 1894 – 24 September 1986) was a prominent mountaineer. She attended Queenwood Ladies' College and went on a climbing tour with fellow student Bryher in Wales and around this time joined the Fell & Rock Climbing Club, later helping found the Pinnacle Club in 1921.

In the 1920s, she climbed extensively in the Alps, Britain, and North America after her marriage to educator, literary critic and rhetorician, I.A. Richards.

In 1928, she made the celebrated first ascent of the north north west ridge of the Dent Blanche in the Swiss Alps, with Joseph Georges, Antoine Georges and her husband, which she described in her well-regarded memoir, Climbing Days (1935) – republished by Canongate Books in 2024.

Pilley's great-great-nephew Dan Richards has written a biography of her, published by Faber and Faber in 2016 and also titled Climbing Days.

== Sources ==
- Osborne, Carol A. (23 September 2004). "Richards [née Pilley], Dorothy Eleanor". Oxford Dictionary of National Biography (online ed.). Oxford University Press. doi:10.1093/ref:odnb/52566. Archived from the original on 28 September 2024. (Subscription or UK public library membership required.)

== Gallery ==
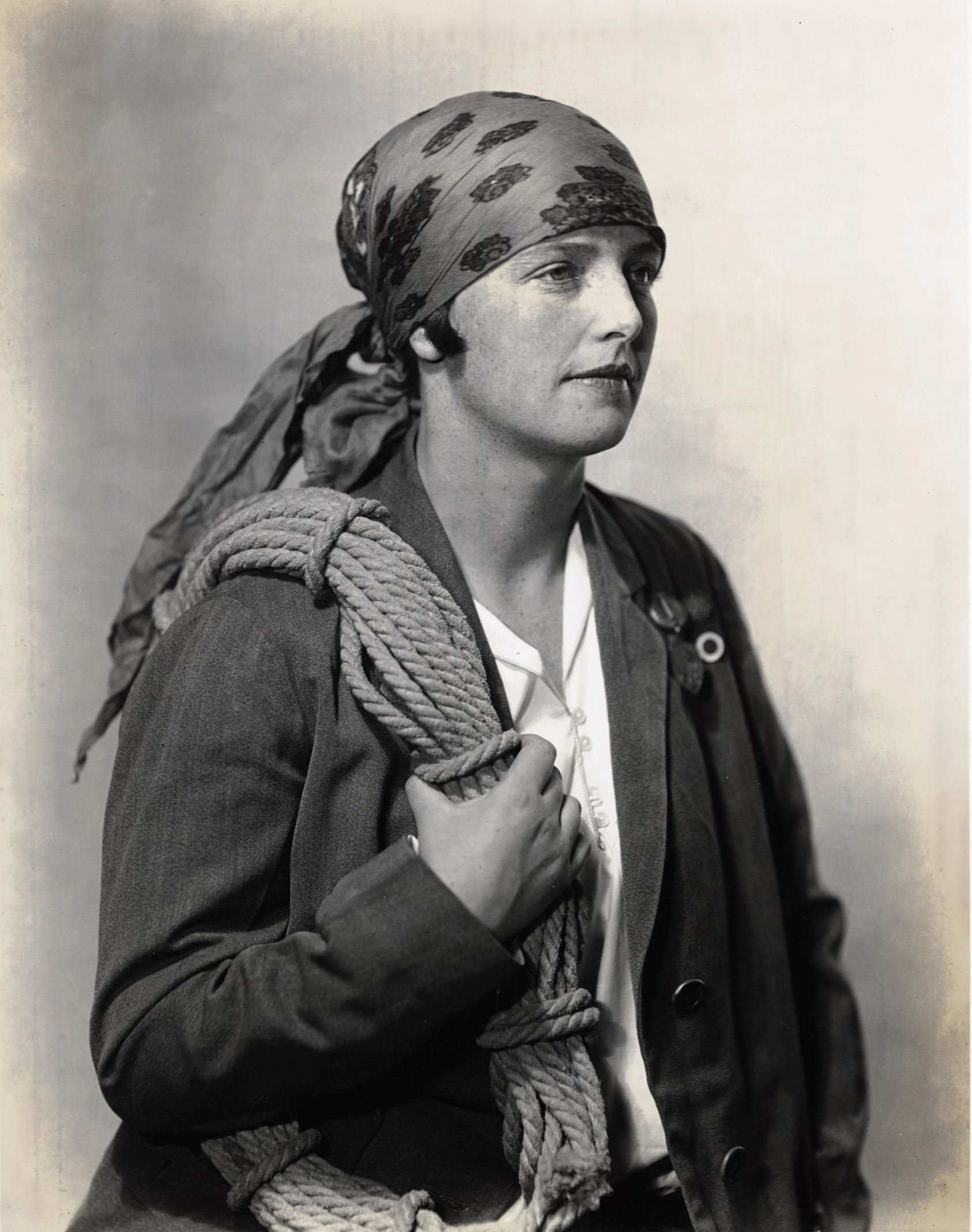
Dorothy Pilley c.1926

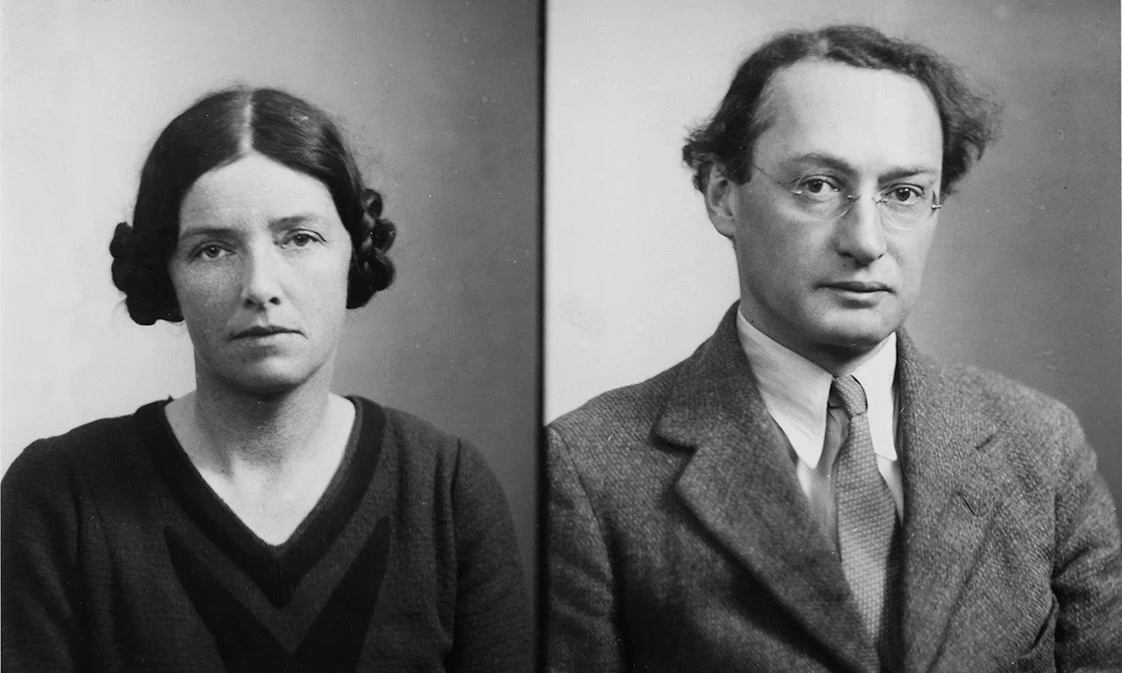
Dorothy Pilley & I.A. Richards - passport photographs 1920s

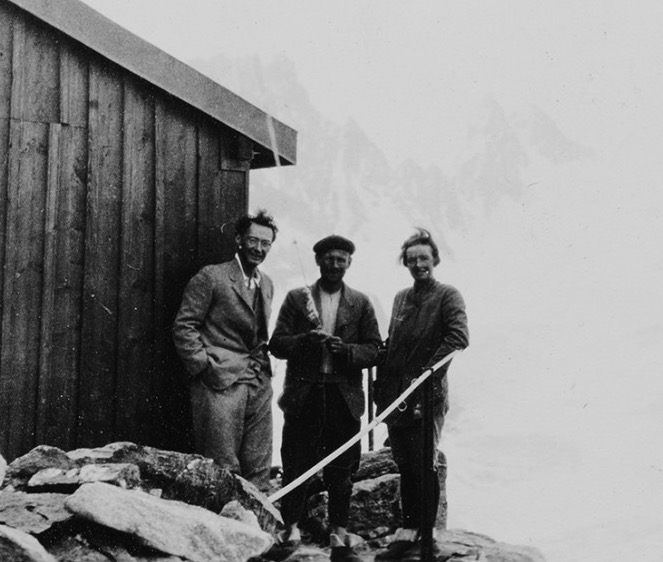
I.A. Richards, Joseph Georges and Dorothy Pilley - Bertol, Switzerland, 1928 (Antoine Georges)

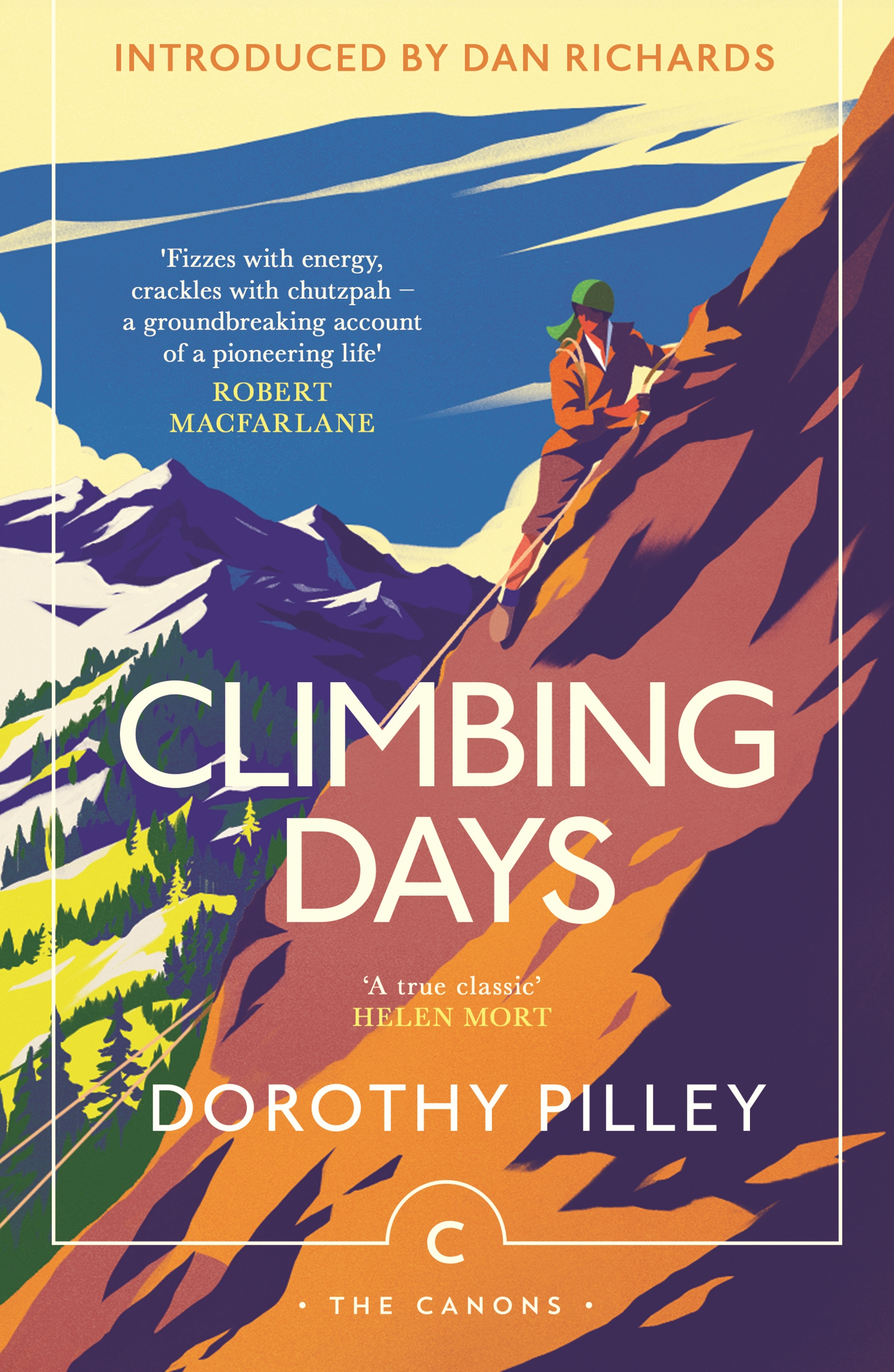
Canongate 'Canon' reissue of Dorothy Pilley's Climbing Days, 2024
