= Bara Shigri Glacier =

Glacier in Himachal Pradesh, India

Bara Shigri
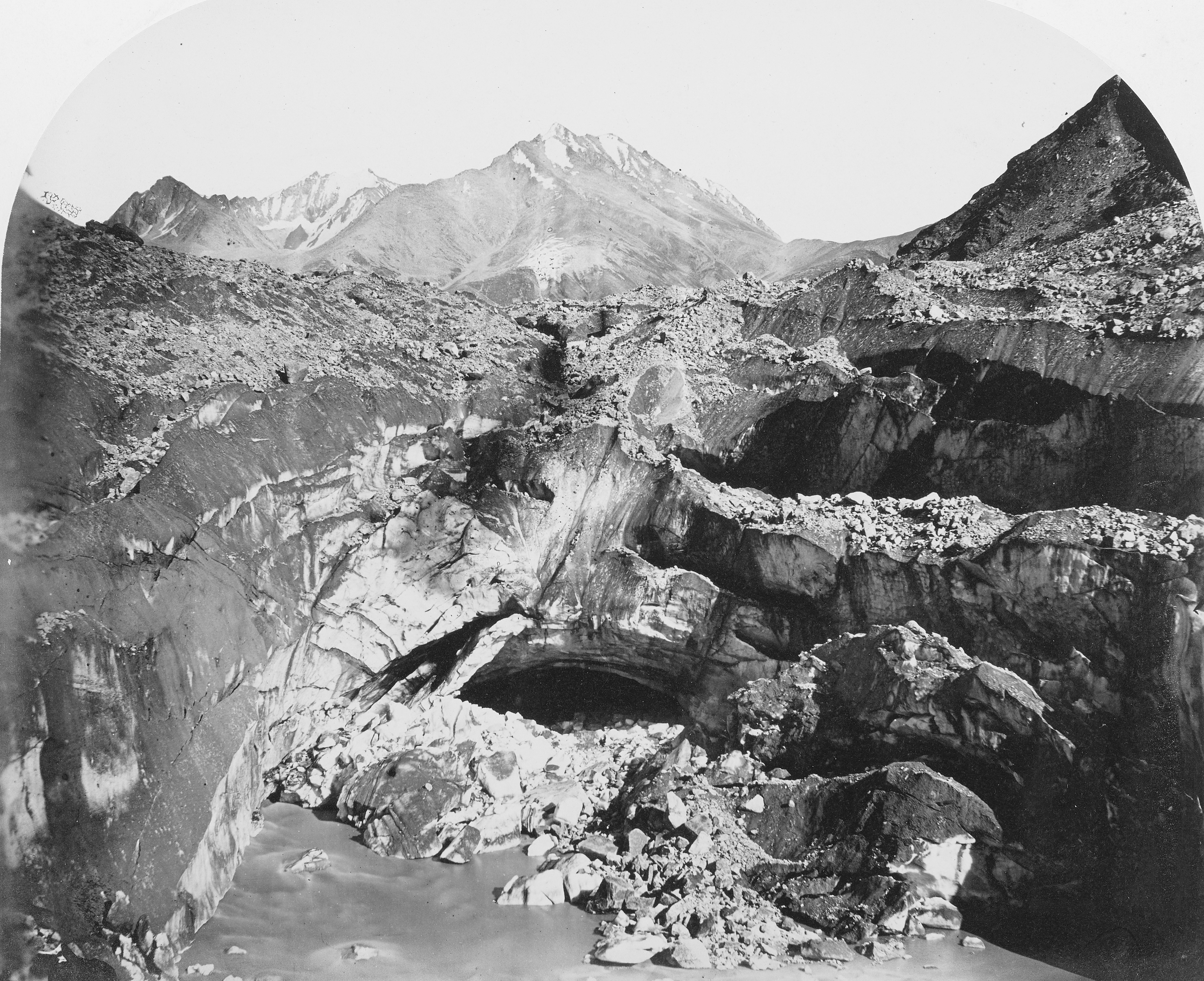
- Ice Cave at the Bara Shigri snout, July 1863.

- Location within Himachal Pradesh Location within India
- Interactive map of Bara Shigri
- Type: Valley glacier
- Location: Lahaul & Spiti, Himachal Pradesh, India
- Coordinates: 32°11′08″N 77°40′28″E
- Area: 126.45 km^{2} (48.82 square miles) (2016)
- Length: 27.7 km (17.2 miles) (2016)
- Highest elevation: 6363 m
- Lowest elevation: 3984 m
- Terminus: Shigri (stream)
- Status: Retreating

Bara Shigri (literally "Great Glacier", Bara = "big" and Shigri = "boulder covered ice") is a glacier located in Lahaul & Spiti, Himachal Pradesh, India. It is currently extending to 27.7 kilometres (17 miles) and covers over 126.45 square kilometres (51 square miles). It is the largest glacier in Himachal Pradesh.

Bara Shigri feeds the Chandra River which after its confluence at Tandi with the Bhaga River is known as Chandrabhaga or Chenab.

According to Hugh Whistler’s 1924 writing, "Shigri is applied par excellence to one particular glacier that emerges from the mountains on the left bank of the Chenab. It is said to be several miles long, and the snout reaches right down to the river, lying athwart the customary road from Kulu to Spiti... In 1836 this glacier dammed the Chenab River, causing the formation of a large lake, which eventually broke loose and caused devastation down the valley."

Across the Bara Shigri is another glacier known as Chhota Shigri. It is, as the name suggests, a comparatively smaller glacier.

== Geology ==
Bara Shigri glacier lies on the northern slopes of the main Pir Panjal Range of the Inner Himalayas. It is fed by various tributary glaciers with the main ones converging at about 4,900 m (16,100 ft). The glacier debouches into the Chandra River through the Shigri stream which instead of joining the river directly from the south, detours to the west shortly after it leaves the ice cave and runs almost parallel to the course of the Chandra River up to Phuti Runi.

The glacierized area of Bara Shigri extends from 3,984 m (13,071 ft) at the snout to about 6,363 m (20,876 ft) at the headwall. The glacier has heterogenic surface characteristics, ranging from clean ice in the accumulation zone to extensive debris cover areas in the lower ablation zone.

A small deposit of antimony ore is known to exist near the Bara Shigri glacier. Making it one of the few reported occurrences of the strategic mineral in India.

== Study History ==
The Bara Shigri glacier was first surveyed in 1906 by H. Walker and E.H. Pascoe of the Geological Survey of India. In 1955, the Geological Survey of India sponsored an expedition to this glacier as part of the Indian programme for the International Geophysical Year 1956–57, when a number of Himalayan glaciers were examined and their snout position fixed.

== Retreat ==
Various studies shows that the Bara Shigri has been retreating continuously. According to one study, from 1965 to 2014 (49 years) the glacier lost a total frontal area of 1.1±0.01 sq. km, with an average terminus retreat of 1100.2±32.1 m (22.5±0.7 m per year).

== See also ==
- List of glaciers of India
- Chhota Shigri
