= Una Cameron =

British mountain climber (1904–1987)

- Born: Una May Cameron; 6 May 1904; West Linton, Peeblesshire, Scotland
- Died: 15 October 1987 (aged 83); Buckingham, England
- Occupations: Mountaineer and author
- Known for: First female to climb Mount Kenya

Una May Cameron (6 May 1904 – 15 October 1987) was a Scottish mountain climber known for her ascents in the Alps, Caucasus and Kenya.

== Biography ==
Cameron was born in West Linton, Scotland. Twin daughter of her father Ewen Cameron, a landed proprietor, and mother Jeanie Dewar from the Dewar whisky family. She studied in the Cheltenham Ladies' College in Montreux, Switzerland and the Central School of Arts and Crafts, London. She had the wealth to live abroad and pursue climbing.

In the 1930s, she made many first ascents in the Alps and in the Caucasus, which she described in A Good Line (1932). She also made the first female ascent of the highest peak, Batian, on Mount Kenya, March 1938. She joined the Ladies' Alpine Club in 1929 and served as its president from 1956 to 1958. She lived for many years in Courmayeur, Italy, and made many ascents in the Mont Blanc range. She died in Buckingham, England.

In 2002, the Montagna Sicura Foundation in Courmayeur, Italy designated their headquarters in Una's home that she had built during the 1930s which is still named after her, Villa Cameron. The foundation aim is to promote safe use and study of the mountains that she loved.
