= Nea Morin =

British rock and mountain climber

Personal information
- Nationality: British
- Born: 21 May 1905
- Died: 12 July 1986 (aged 81)
- Spouse: Jean Morin
- Relative(s): Charles Evans, son in law

Nea Everilda Morin (née Barnard) (21 May 1905 – 12 July 1986) was a British rock climber and mountain climber.

Morin climbed in the Alps in the 1920s, joined the Ladies' Alpine Club, and met many climbers in the French Groupe de haute montagne. In 1928 she married Jean Morin (1897–1943) and lived in Paris. She climbed often with other women and advocated the cordée féminine, climbing only with women on a rope. After the death of her husband in World War II, she lived in Tunbridge Wells and climbed in England and Wales, she was elected president of the Ladies' Alpine Club (1944-1946) and was a member of the female-only Pinnacle Club.

In 1941 Morin had made the first ascent of Clogwyn Y Grochan the route, which is 230 feet high and graded very severe 4b, is named Nea. She also led on an ascent of Curving Crack on Clogwyn du'r Arddu (the Black Cliff). In 1959, she was the only woman in the team of six British climbers who attempted to make the first ascent of 6812 meter high Ama Dablam in Nepal.

Her autobiography, A Woman's Reach (1968), describes her climbing and the achievement of other women in the mountains.

She frequently climbed with her daughter, Denise, who went on to marry the surgeon and Everest mountaineer Charles Evans in 1957.
