= Edouard Wyss-Dunant =

Swiss physician and alpinist

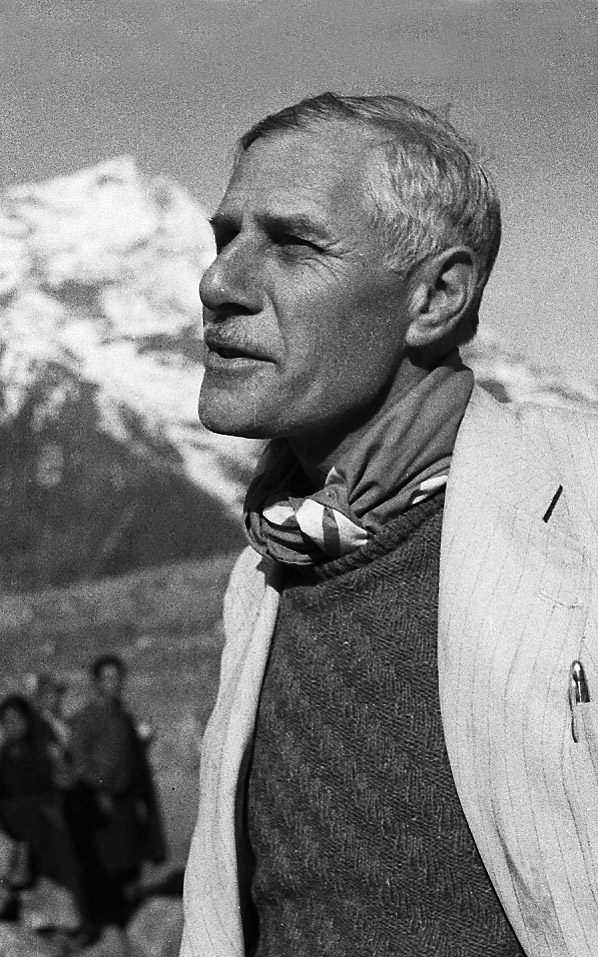
- Born: 17 April 1897
- Died: 29 April 1983 (aged 86)
- Citizenship: Swiss
- Scientific career
- Fields: Medicine

Edouard Wyss-Dunant (17 April 1897 – 29 April 1983) was a Swiss physician and alpinist. He had a distinguished career in medicine, both in his own country and abroad. He published a number of treatises in his professional capacity and was the author of several mountaineering books. He is best known for his leadership of the Swiss Expedition to Everest of 1952.

== Biography ==
Wyss-Dunant had a Swiss-German father and a Vaudoise mother. He spent his childhood in Alsace, where his father managed a chemical works. He went on to study medicine in Geneva. After receiving a doctorate in radiology in Zurich he set himself up as a practitioner in radiology in Bern and became a member of the Berner Akademische Alpen-Klub (Bern Academical Alpine Club). Later, he moved into a practice in Geneva, where he met his future wife, Lucrece, and there, with the exception of a period spent in North Africa, he made his home for the rest of his life.

During his stay in Bern, Wyss-Dunant climbed all the main summits of the Bernese Oberland: among the classic routes in his record at that time were the Mittellegi Ridge of the Eiger, the North Ridge of the Mönch and many good ascents in the chain of the Grosses Engelhorn. In his early twenties, he traversed the Dent d'Hérens from the Tiefenmatten-Joch to the Col du Lion and made a double traverse, in two days, of both the Matterhorn and the Dent d'Hérens. He also achieved a solo traverse of the Matterhorn and climbed it by its formidable Furggen-Grat with Alexander Taugwalder. He also climbed extensively in the Mont Blanc massif with Marcel Kurz.

Wyss-Dunant also participated in several expeditions further afield: in Mexico (1936), East Africa (1937), Greenland (1938), Tibesti (Chad) (1946) and in the Himalaya (1947 and 1952). The accounts of these exploits are recorded in his books: "Appels des Sommets", "Au dela des Cîmes", "Sur les Hauts Plateaux Mexicains", "Mes Ascensions en Afrique", "Mirages Groenlandais" and "Forets et Cîmes Himalayennes".

The climax of his career as an alpinist was his selection by the Swiss Foundation for Alpine Exploration as leader of the Geneva-based Swiss Expedition to Everest in the spring of 1952.

Wyss-Dunant also served as president of the Swiss Alpine Club and the Union Internationale des Associations d'Alpinisme. In tribute to these services and to his lifelong record as a climber he was made an honorary member of the Alpine Club in 1963.

== Spring 1952 expedition to the Everest ==
Edouard Wyss-Dunant, was appointed leader of this expedition. All the expedition's participants were from Geneva, they almost all belonged to the exclusive «L'Androsace» climbing club and knew each other very well. The city and Canton of Geneva provided moral and financial support for the expedition, and the University of Geneva provided the scientific contingent.

The mountaineering task that this team had set itself was primarily exploring the access to the South Col, the conquest of the labyrinthine Khumbu Icefall, and possibly the advance to the South Col.

Raymond Lambert and Sherpa Tenzing Norgay were able to reach a height of about 8,595 metres (28,199 ft) on the southeast ridge, setting a new climbing altitude record. Tenzing's experience was useful when he was hired to be part of the British expedition in 1953 during which he summited with Edmund Hillary.

== Scientific research ==
Among his research works, Edouard Wyss-Dunant coined the term "Death Zone" in an article about acclimatisation published in the journal of the Swiss Foundation for Alpine Research.
