= Chhota Shigri =

Glacier in Himachal Pradesh, India

- Location within Himachal Pradesh Location within India
- Interactive map of Chhota Shigri
- Type: Valley glacier
- Location: Lahaul & Spiti, Himachal Pradesh, India
- Coordinates: 32°15′N 77°31′E
- Area: 16 square kilometres (6.2 sq mi)

The Chhota Shigri Glacier lies on the northern slope of the main ridge of the Pir Panjal Range of the inner Himalayas, east of the Rohtang Pass (H.P.). The high, steep ridges and mountain terrain provide ideal conditions for the development of this glacier.

== Geography ==
The Chhota Shigri Glacier is covering about 16 square kilometres (6.2 sq mi) area. The total drainage area of Chhota Shigri Glacier stream is approximately 35 square kilometres (14 sq mi). There is very high gradient from accumulation zone to ablation area and snout. The glacier meltwater drains out in a single confined stream and meets the Chandra River. Lateral moraines are present all along the body of the glacier up to the accumulation zone. This glacier is one of the best recorded in terms of mass budget studies among the other glaciers in the entire Himalayan region. Since 2002, Jawaharlal Nehru University in New Delhi is monitoring the glaciers for its mass balance and different hydrological aspects on an annual basis.

== See also ==
- List of glaciers of India
