= Gwen Moffat =

British mountaineer and writer (born 1924)

- Born: Gwen Mary Goddard; 3 July 1924 (age 102); Brighton, East Sussex, England
- Occupations: Mountaineer, writer
- Spouses: Gordon Moffat; John Lees (m. 1955; div. 1970)
- Children: 1
- Writing career
- Genres: Fiction, biography

Gwen Mary Moffat (née Goddard; born 3 July 1924) is a British mountaineer and writer.

== Climbing career ==
Moffat was an Army driver in the Auxiliary Territorial Service during WW2, she found her role very undemanding and went AWOL to North Wales where she met a climber who introduced her to climbing -barefoot, and a bohemian lifestyle. During the 1940s and 1950s she lived rough, climbing in Snowdonia, the Lakes, Scotland and the Alps, supporting herself by working in several roles including as a domestic service, a farmer, a forester, an artist's model and the driver of a travelling shop. In 1953 she became the first female British certificated mountain guide, and for ten years she was closely associated with the RAF Mountain Rescue Service, making a living from climbing.

Moffatt was known for often climbing barefoot, claiming that it was better because there was more contact with the rock and no constriction of the toes. She is an honorary member of the women-only Pinnacle Club and the British Mountaineering Council.

== Media ==
Moffat featured in the BBC film Eye to Eye, broadcast in 1958. Joe Brown did the hard amateur climbing and Moffat, the professional, took her husband up a route on Idwal Slabs. In 2015 Jen Randall and Claire Carter made a film, Operation Moffat, based on Moffat's autobiographical book Space below my Feet. The film was premiered during Banff Mountain Film Festival's UK tour, and has won over 20 international film awards. Moffat is included in Herrington's photographic work The Climbers featuring 60 climbers considered legends of the 20th century. In 2017 she contributed to a documentary Give Me Space Below My Feet, for BBC Radio 3. In 2015, the short documentary Operation Moffat—directed by Jen Randall and Claire Carter, and inspired by Moffat’s autobiography Space Below My Feet—won Best Climbing Film and the People’s Choice Award at the Kendal Mountain Festival.

== Writing career ==
Moffat began her writing career in the 1950s, working for BBC radio, and published her autobiography in 1961. In the 1970s, she started writing crime fiction, in particular the Miss Pink series featuring Melinda Pink, a middle aged climber and magistrate. Following a commission by Victor Gollancz Ltd to follow the California Trail and produce a book, she subsequently wrote 11 mysteries set in the American West. She wrote her last novel, Gone Feral, when she was in her 80s. She currently reviews for the crime magazine Shots.

== Personal life ==
Moffat married Gordon Moffat with whom she had a daughter, Sheena, born in 1949. In 1955, she married Flight Sergeant John Lees, BEM, GM. They divorced in 1970.

Moffat turned 100 on 3 July 2024.

== Works ==
- Space Below my Feet (1961)
- Two Star Red (1964)
- On My Home Ground (1968)
- Survival Count (1972)
- Deviant Death (1973)
- Lady with a Cool Eye (Melinda Pink) (1973)
- The Corpse Road (1974).
- Hard Option (1975)
- Miss Pink at the Edge of the World (Melinda Pink) (1975)
- A Short Time to Live (Melinda Pink) (1976)
- Over the Sea to Death (Melinda Pink) (1976)
- Persons Unknown (Melinda Pink) (1978)
- Hard Road West (1981)
- Die Like a Dog (Melinda Pink) (1982)
- The Buckskin Girl (1982)
- Last Chance Country (Melinda Pink) (1983)
- Grizzly Trail (Melinda Pink) (1984)
- Snare (Melinda Pink) (1987)
- The Stone Hawk (Melinda Pink) (1989)
- The Storm Seekers (1989)
- Rage (Melinda Pink) (1990)
- The Raptor Zone (Melinda Pink) (1990)
- Pit Bull (1991)
- Veronica's Sisters (Melinda Pink) (1992)
- The Outside Edge (1993)
- Cue the Battered Wife (1994)
- A Wreath of Dead Moths (1998)
- The Lost Girls (Melinda Pink) (1998)
- Private Sins (Melinda Pink) (1999)
- Running Dogs (1999)
- Quicksand (2001)
- Retribution (Melinda Pink) (2002)
- Man Trap (2003)
- Dying for Love (2005)
- Gone Feral (2007)
