= Raymond Lambert =

Swiss mountain climber

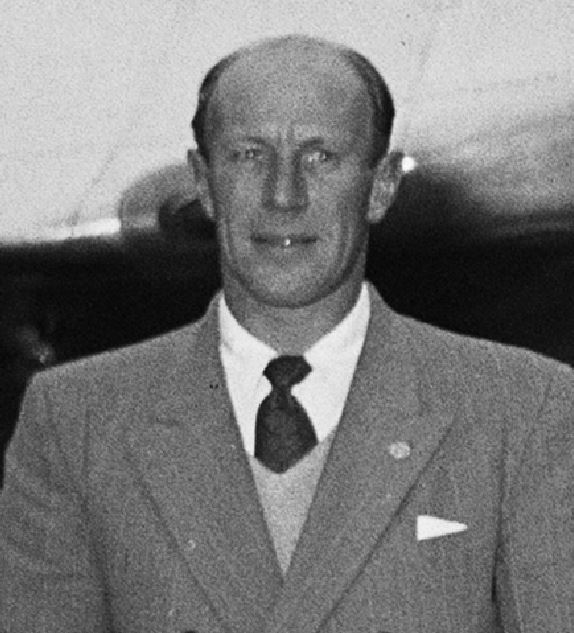
Swiss Himalaya Expedition 1952

Raymond Lambert (18 October 1914 – 24 February 1997) was a Swiss mountaineer who together with Sherpa Tenzing Norgay reached an altitude of 8611 metres (just 237 metres from the summit) of Mount Everest, as part of a Swiss Expedition in May 1952. At the time it was the highest point that a climber had ever reached. There was a second Swiss expedition in autumn 1952, but a party including Lambert and Tenzing was forced to turn back at a slightly lower point. The following year Tenzing returned with Edmund Hillary to reach the summit on 29 May 1953.

== Early mountaineering ==
He was born Raymond Jules Eugene Lambert in Geneva, where he made his home for his entire life. Lambert was member to a group of elite Genevois climbers. With this group, Lambert tested his skills against French, German and Italian rivals to become the first ascenders of the hardest new climbs in the Mont Blanc Range. Second ascents of the Croz Spur on the Grandes Jorasses and the North Face of the Drus (where his name is immortalised in the Fissure Lambert) put him at the forefront of international mountaineering; however, it was one climb in particular, in 1938, that gave Lambert true legendary status: a winter ascent of the Aiguilles Diables. Caught in a violent February storm, the climbing party found themselves stranded on the summit of Mont Blanc du Tacul. Lambert was the only one capable of contacting rescue. After three days sheltering in a crevasse, all of Lambert's toes were severely frostbitten. Subsequently, all of his toes were amputated.

== On Everest ==
For more details on Lambert's first attempt, see 1952 Swiss Mount Everest Expedition.

Within a year after the amputation, Lambert was climbing again. His mountaineering career continued through the Second World War and in 1952 he was an obvious choice for Edouard Wyss-Dunant's Genevois expedition to Everest. Tibet was now closed to foreigners but Nepal had just opened up. The previous year Eric Shipton's British-New Zealand reconnaissance had climbed the Khumbu Icefall and reached the elusive Western Cwm, proving that Everest could be climbed from Nepal. Unfortunately for the British, who had enjoyed exclusive access to the mountain for 21 years, the Nepal government gave the 1952 permit to the Swiss. Building on Shipton's experience, the Genevans reached the head of the Western Cwm and climbed the huge face above to the desolate, wind-swept plateau of the South Col. Three Swiss climbers and Sherpa Tenzing Norgay continued towards the summit, pitching a tent at 8,400m. Two returned, leaving Tenzing and Lambert, who had become firm friends, to make a summit attempt. High altitude mountaineering in 1952 was still in its infancy. Even Swiss organisation and technology were not up to the job and, apart from Tenzing, the Sherpas had little experience. Despite the best plans, Tenzing and Lambert now had to spend a night at 8,400m with no sleeping bags and no stove, producing a trickle of drinking water by melting snow over a candle. The oxygen sets were barely operable and when the two men continued in the morning, they were effectively climbing without oxygen. They struggled heroically, at times crawling on all fours, hindered by the dead weight of malfunctioning oxygen sets, finally grinding to a halt near 8595m, approximately 250m short of the summit. Assuming that George Mallory and Andrew Irvine did not reach higher in 1924, this was the highest than anyone had ever been. Lambert's extraordinary determination was further confirmed that autumn when, alone out of the spring team, he returned for the second Swiss attempt on Everest. This time he and Tenzing were driven back from the South Col by the November jet stream winds and, to the immense relief of the British team, preparing for 1953, the Swiss admitted defeat.

== After Everest ==
Lambert returned to Nepal in 1954, trespassing across the Tibetan frontier to attempt Gaurisankar. Having failed at Gaurisankar, the expedition attempted Cho Oyu, but was turned back by high winds at about 23000 feet. Lambert returned again to Nepal in 1955 to make the first ascent with Eric Gauchat and Claude Kogan of Ganesh I (7,429m), where Gauchat died from a fall during their return. Subsequent expeditions took him to Pakistan and South America. Then in 1959 he embarked on a completely new career and by 1963, now married with two children, he was a fully qualified glacier pilot, flying to remote and inaccessible icy areas - a vocation which brought him considerable fame until he finally stopped flying in 1987. Ten years later, aged 82, Lambert died near his home in Geneva due to complications of a lung disorder.

== Honour and respect ==
John Hunt recalls meeting Raymond Lambert in 1953 to learn as much as he could about the Swiss attempt on Everest: "Despite their disappointment, the Swiss were most helpful. However, Raymond told me tactfully, `Monsieur Colonel, vous aurez gros problemes', meaning, I think, that we hadn't a hope in hell." On 26 May 1953, exactly a year after Lambert's attempt, Hunt himself photographed the skeletal remains of the tent at 8,400m. Said Hunt: "It brought home the significance of their performance and made me force myself 50m higher up the ridge, to deposit the supplies for our final camp." Three days later Tenzing and Hillary reached the summit. On the way home, the team stopped off at Zürich airport and met the Swiss trail-blazers again. Lord Hunt recalls: "They offered us unreserved applause. In later years Raymond and I became close friends. He was not a demonstrative person, but the warmth of personality, once bestowed, was very precious to me."
