= Claudine van der Straten-Ponthoz =

Belgian-French mountaineer

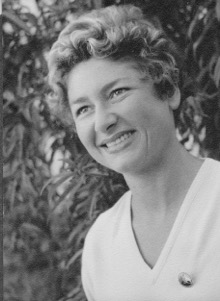
Claudine van der Straten in 1959.

Claudine van der Straten-Ponthoz (Etterbeek, 25 September 1924 - Himalaya 2 October 1959) was a pioneering Belgian-French mountaineer, who died on October 2, 1959, while taking part in a women-only expedition to climb the 8,188 m (26,864 ft) Cho Oyu, the sixth-highest mountain in the world. She and the leader of the expedition, Claude Kogan, and two Sherpa porters perished in an avalanche. Dorothea Gravina then took charge of the expedition.

Baroness Van der Straten-Ponthoz was a former skiing star and the daughter of the Belgian count Roger van der Straten Ponthoz (1888-1972).

== See also ==
- List of deaths on eight-thousanders
- Chloé Graftiaux, Belgian female alpinist
