= Ladies' Alpine Club =

First women's mountaineering club, founded in London in 1907

- Merged into: 1975
- Formation: December 1907
- Founder: Elizabeth Le Blond and other women climbers
- Dissolved: 1975
- Merger of: Alpine Club
- Type: Mountaineering club
- Headquarters: London, England
- Region served: United Kingdom
- Members: Women mountaineers
- Official language: English
- Publication: Ladies' Alpine Club Journal

The Ladies' Alpine Club was founded in London, England in 1907 and was the first mountaineering club for women. It merged with the Alpine Club of Great Britain in 1975.

== History ==
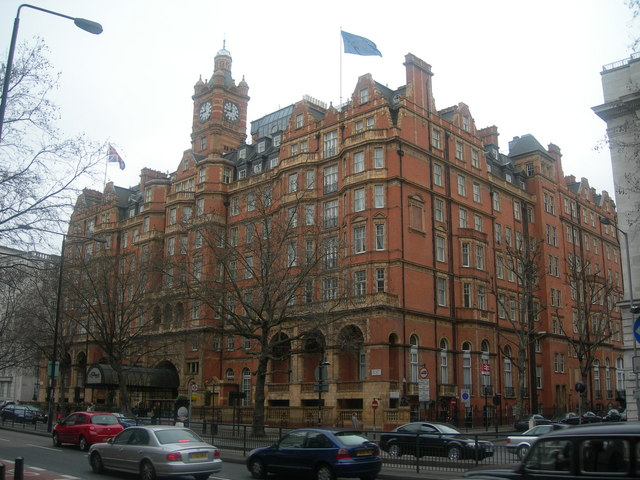
The Great Central Hotel, Marylebone (now the Landmark London), where the club had rooms and held its annual dinner

In December 1907 a group of ladies who were climbers in the Alps met in London and agreed to form a new club, similar to the long-established Alpine Club, which at the time did not accept women members on account of their supposed physical and moral deficiencies in the matter of mountain climbing. The club's first president was Elizabeth Le Blond, who had been praised by T. G. Bonney when he became president of the Alpine Club as one of those "whom our stern Salic law prevents us from numbering among our members", and it was the first club specifically for women mountaineers. Initially, it was the Alpine Section of the Lyceum Club, an intellectual women's club, to which Elizabeth Le Blond belonged, but in 1908 it established an independent existence. The club had its base at the Great Central Hotel, Marylebone, but was seen as affiliated to the Alpine Club and junior to it.

As well as arranging climbing expeditions, the Ladies' Alpine Club organised a monthly lecture and provided rooms where members could meet for tea. For the duration of the First World War, the club's rooms were taken over by the War Department, but they were restored in 1919. The Alpine Club itself was at first sceptical about the Ladies' Club, but it soon began to take it seriously and to co-operate with it, especially after Queen Margherita of Italy accepted the position of Honorary President. According to Ann Bridge, a friend and climbing partner of George Mallory, the Ladies' Club held an annual dinner at the Great Central Hotel:

This was a large affair, 250 people at least; the Alpine Club came to it en masse, and the speech of the evening was always the one proposing the toast of "The Alpine Club", which one of the ladies had to make.

At the first such annual dinner, on 7 December 1908, the President of the Alpine Club, Herman Woolley, spoke supportively of the new organisation and noted that ladies could make "ascents of the very first order". A former president of the Alpine Club then added that in his time he had wanted to admit women to membership, and indeed had found that a majority of other members supported this, but he had decided not to force the issue on an "unwilling minority".

Despite this apparent rapprochement, a certain animus towards women climbers from their colleagues in the senior club remained for many years. Ellen Pigeon stated: "In days gone by many A.C.s refused to speak to us," and one of the leading women climbers of the age, the American Fanny Bullock Workman, found male mountaineers in Britain to be less than friendly to her. In his obituary of Workman, Captain J. P. Farrar remarked:

It is possible that some unconscious feeling let us say of the novelty of a woman's intrusion into the domain of exploration so long reserved to man, may in some quarters have existed ... there tended to arise ... an atmosphere shall we say of aloofness.

In 1921 a rival organisation called the Pinnacle Club was founded by the wives of two members of the Climbers' Club. When the British Mountaineering Council was constituted in 1945, both clubs for women, the Ladies' Alpine Club and the Pinnacle Club, were represented on its committee.

== Merger with Alpine Club ==
The Alpine Club had long resisted admitting women members, and in 1973 an attempt to have this policy reversed was defeated, the necessary two-thirds majority not being achieved. In May 1974, however, another vote was held and, despite the continued opposition of the influential Bill Tilman, women were at last allowed to join the club. This made the existence of a separate women's club unnecessary, and in 1975 the Ladies' Alpine Club merged with the Alpine Club, the latter gaining 150 new members. The merger was not universally popular, and 37 women resigned in protest in 1975 or soon thereafter, including Joyce Dunsheath, Miriam Underhill and Monica Jackson. The first two women to be elected to membership of the Alpine Club in their own right were Sally Westmacott, wife of Mike Westmacott, who had been on the 1953 Everest expedition, and Betty Seifert.

== Ladies' Alpine Club Journal ==
Between 1920 and 1975 the club issued a yearbook, which was absorbed into the Alpine Journal on the merger of the two clubs. Until 1960 the title of the yearbook was simply Ladies Alpine Club, then from 1961 to 1975 it was called Ladies Alpine Club Journal. All issues were indexed in 2000 by Johanna Merz, former editor of the Alpine Journal.

== Presidents ==
- 1907–1912: Mrs Aubrey Le Blond (1860–1934)
- 1913–1915: Lucy Walker (1836–1916)
- 1916–1919: Margaret Meyer (1862–1924)
- 1920–1922: Louise Nettleton (1874–1954)
- 1929–1931: Katherine Wedgwood (1880–1976)
- 1938–1940: Beatrice McAndrew (1870–1970)
- 1941–1943: Katie Gardiner (1885–1974)
- 1944–1946: Nea Morin (1905–1986)
- 1953–1955: Lady Chorley (1897–1986)
- 1956–1958: Una Cameron (1904–1987)
- 1970–1971: Dora de Beer (1891–1982)
- 1973–1975: Margaret Darvall (1911–1996)

== Notable members ==
- Anna Pigeon (1832–1917), vice-president from 1910
- Katy Richardson (1854–1927)
- Fanny Bullock Workman (1859–1925), joined 1908, vice-president for America in 1912.
- Margaret Lorimer (1866–1954), New Zealand member
- Gertrude Benham (1867–1938), created honorary member in 1935.
- Phyllis Munday (1894–1990), joined 1937, created honorary member in 1936
- Mary Dilys Glynne (1895–1991), vice-president 1975
- Miriam O'Brien Underhill (1898–1976), joined 1926, vice-president 1931-1970, created honorary member in 1970

== See also ==
- List of alpine clubs
