= Thomas Stretcher =

Rescue equipment

The Thomas Stretcher is a British mountain rescue stretcher designed in the 1930s by a climbing club committee formed to investigate the construction of a stretcher specifically for carrying injured climbers over rough ground.

== Background ==
A Stretcher Committee was formed by the Rucksack Club after a prominent member had severe fall whilst rock climbing. The member was badly injured and had to be transported from the climb on a makeshift stretcher formed from a farm gate in much discomfort, with his leg being later amputated in hospital.

The Joint Stretcher Committee was formed in 1933 when the Rucksack Club Stretcher Committee merged with the similar venture of the Fell & Rock Climbing Club. Their requirements were:

1. minimum weight.
2. quite exceptional strength and rigidity under varied strains.
3. provision for the loaded weight to be shared by more than the usual two bearers.
4. provision to allow the bearers to walk in file on the level and to advance in line on a steep slope.
5. portability (i.e. it should be possible to take the empty stretcher apart in case of need).
6. means to hold the patient in position with the least discomfort even when being lowered down a vertical face.
7. means to keep his body from contact with the rock under such circumstances.

== Design ==
By Easter 1934 the Committee had the preliminary design of 'A Stretcher', later to become known as the Thomas Stretcher after one of the committee members Eustace Thomas, as well as recommendations of first aid and survival equipment to accompany it. The equipment could be packed into two rucksacks.

The basic design of the stretcher was a lightweight aluminium frame supporting a canvas bed. Extendible handles at each corner folded so that the stretcher to be used on narrow paths, and wooden skis kept the casualty clear of the ground and allowed sledging on mud or snow.

== Use ==
The Thomas Stretcher was one of the most widely used Mountain Rescue stretcher in the UK until the early 1970s, when it was superseded by the Bell Stretcher.

Modified Thomas Stretchers are still in regular use by at least one English Mountain Rescue Team.
