= Loenpo Gang =

Mountain in Nepal and China

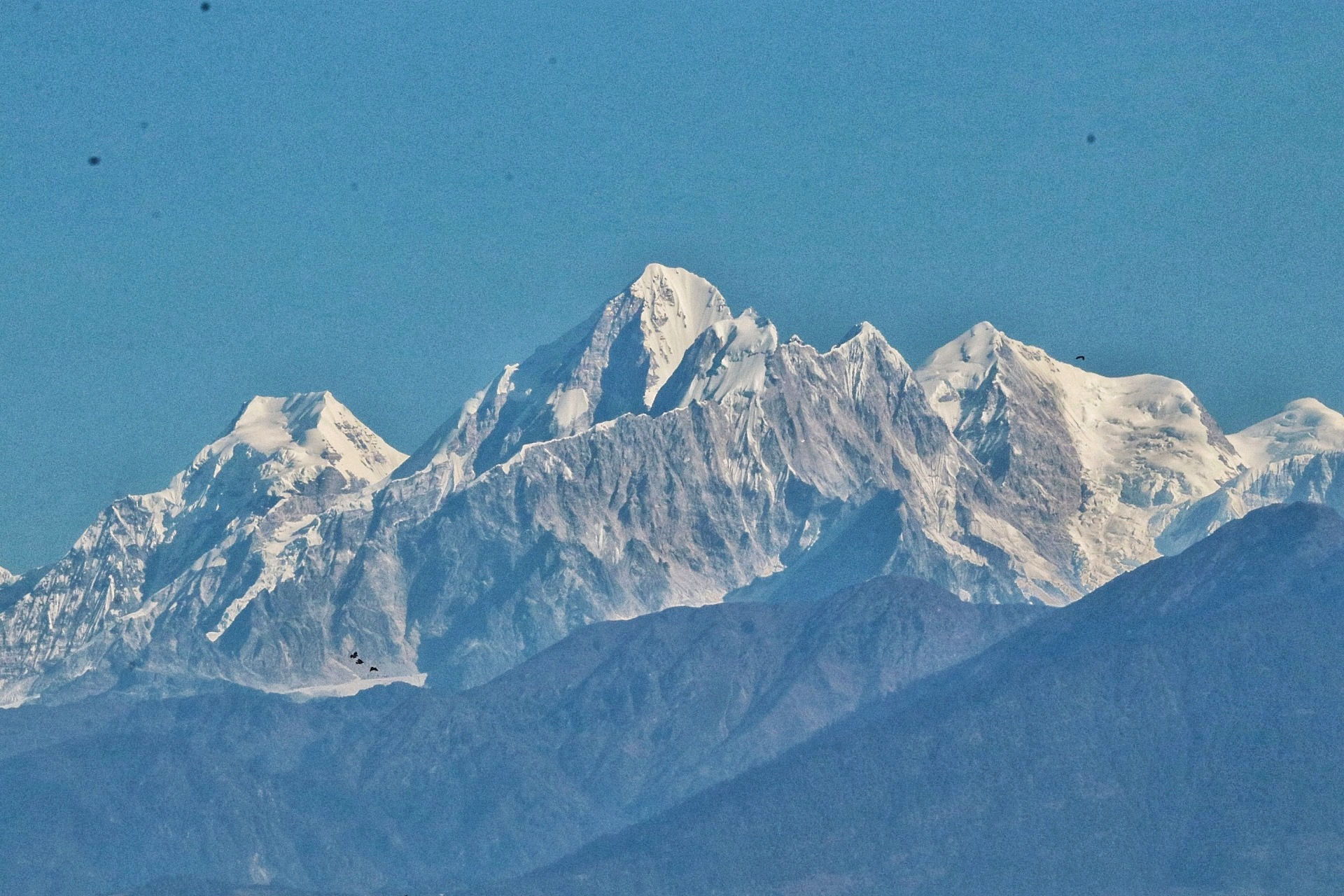
- Loenpo Gang (right) behind Dorje Lhakpa (centre)

Highest point
- Elevation: 6,979 m (22,897 ft)
- Prominence: 1,019 m (3,343 ft)
- Parent peak: Nyanang Ri
- Listing: Mountains of China; Mountains of Nepal
- Coordinates: 28°11′44″N 85°47′58″E

Geography
- Location within Nepal Location within Tibet Location within China
- Countries: Nepal and China
- Parent range: Himalayas

Climbing
- First ascent: May 3, 1962

Loenpo Gang (also known as Lönpo Gang) is a mountain peak in the Himalayas on the border of Nepal and the Tibet Autonomous Region of People's Republic of China.

== Location ==
The peak is located at 6,979 m (22,897 ft) above sea level. It is part of Jugal Himal range which also consists of following peaks Dorje Lhakpa, Gurkarpo Ri, and Phurbi Chyachu. The prominence is 1,042 m (3,419 ft).

== Climbing history ==
The first attempt on the summit was made in 1957, by a British team from the YRC. The team withdrew from the mountain after the leader, Crosby Fox, and two sherpas, Mingma Tensing and Lakpa Norbu, were killed in an avalanche.

The first ascent was made on 3 May 1962, by a Japanese team consisting of Tadashi Morita, and Kazunari Yasuhisa.

In 1988, a team of South Korean doctors from Chonnam National University Medical School climbed the peak from a new route, and reached the summit on 27 September. The team consisted of Ryong Yoon-Jae, Cho Suk-Phil, Kwon Hyeon, Hong Woon-Ki, Lee Jeong-Hoon, and Kim Soo-Hyeon.
