= Climbing club =

Organization to support climbing

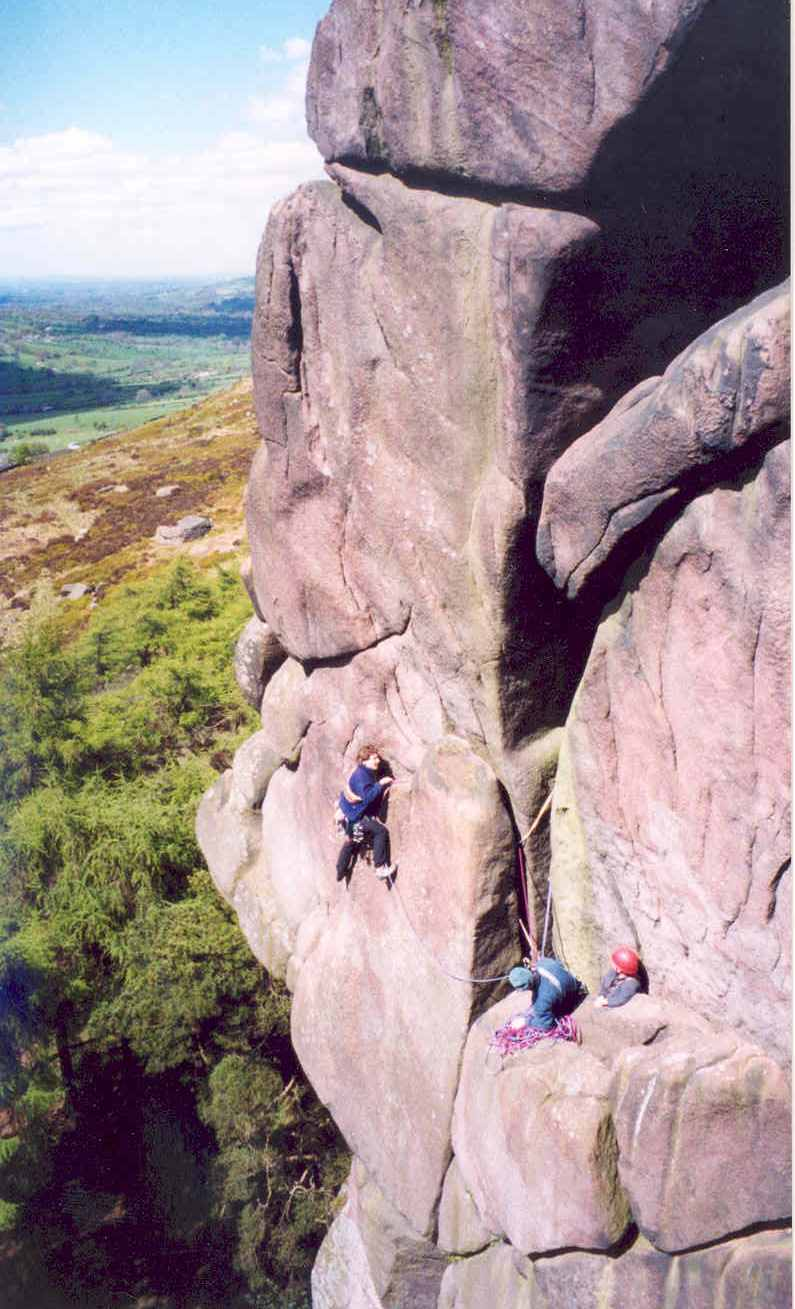
Climbers on "Valkyrie" at the Roaches, UK

Climbing, or alpine, clubs form to promote and preserve the climbing way of life, including rock climbing, ice climbing, alpinism & ski mountaineering.

Clubs frequently act as advocates to protect climbing areas, advocate for climbers around the world, preserve climbing’s history and chronicle climbing achievement.

Climbing clubs usually schedule climbing meets & events allowing members an opportunity to meet like-minded individuals, learn new skills and partake in lead climbing which by definition requires two or more individuals.

== Organization ==
Climbing clubs are often affiliated to a national governing or representative body for purposes of public liability insurance.

In the UK this is most often the British Mountaineering Council. In Ireland this is most often Mountaineering Ireland.

== Club facilities ==
Clubs may typically provide:

- Scheduled meets & training
- Mountain huts & reciprocal arrangements with other hut owners
- Books, newsletters & other publications
- Social events
- Limited public/civil liability insurance
- Rescue insurance
- Discount schemes with climbing shops
- Libraries & photo collections
- Climbing grants
- Conservation, stewardship & advocacy

== Notable climbing clubs ==
- Climbers' Club
- California Mountaineering Group
- American Alpine Club
- British Alpine Club
- Swiss Alpine Club (Club Alpin Suisse)
- French Climbing Club (Club Alpin Francais)
- German Alpine Club
- (Netherlands climbing and mountaineering society) Nederlandse Klim en Bergsport Vereniging (NKBV)
