= Ken Wilson (mountaineering writer) =

Kenneth John Wilson (1941–2016), British writer, publisher and editor

- Born: Kenneth John Wilson; 7 February 1941; Solihull, England
- Died: 11 June 2016 (aged 75)
- Known for: writer, editor and publisher
- Notable work: Mountain, Hard Rock (1974)
- Spouse: Gloria (m. 1971–2016)
- Children: 2

Kenneth John Wilson (7 February 1941 – 11 June 2016) was a British writer, publisher and editor of books and magazines about climbing and mountaineering. The British Mountaineering Council's Summit Magazine described him as "one of the most influential voices in British climbing". In 1974 he edited and contributed to the first editions of the book Hard Rock which The Guardian considered was "among the most influential climbing books of the 20th century."

== Early life ==
Wilson was born in Solihull to Blanche (née Colman) and John Wilson, a salesman of stationery. He attended Birmingham College of Art where he studied architecture and photography before working for the architectural photographer Henk Snoek for four years in London. During this time he met his future wife Gloria – they married in 1971 and had two children. Based on his experience from the early 1950s with a holiday in the Lake District and with climbing and walking with the scouts, in 1968 he took up a post to run a Youth Hostels Association magazine called Mountain Craft.

== Writing, publishing and editing ==
In 1960 with his long-time friend Dave Cook he went on a Mountaineering Association course in the Alps climbing 19 peaks near Arolla. Wilson never became an outstanding climber although he did climb the Younggrat route on the Breithorn. He became a significant figure in the group of young climbers that formed in Llanberis, North Wales. Gaining the support of his network of climbing friends, he was able to develop Mountain Craft into a flourishing magazine which he then bought, changed its name to Mountain and then fostered, wrote for and edited from 1969 to 1978. It distinctly reflected the culture of the climbing and mountaineering community of the time. The magazine had high journalistic standards, exemplified by its coverage of the Cairngorm Plateau disaster in 1971. Alan Hinkes considered it "perhaps the finest mountain magazine ever published".

His 1974 compendium Mountain Craft was aimed firmly at practitioners of the sport and attracted writers such as Chris Bonington, Royal Robbins, Jim Perrin, Ed Drummond and Al Alvarez. As well as Hard Rock he produced Classic Rock and Extreme Rock, Cold Climbs, The Big Walks, Classic Walks and Wild Walks along with his 1978 anthology The Games Climbers Play. He was a contributor to The Black Cliff. He founded two publishing firms: Diadem and Bâton Wicks.

Wilson became prominent in British mountaineering politics with campaigns to allow women to join the Climbers' Club, becoming a committee member of the British Mountaineering Council and voicing his forceful opinions on mountaineering ethics.
