= Climbing guidebook =

Book describing climbing routes

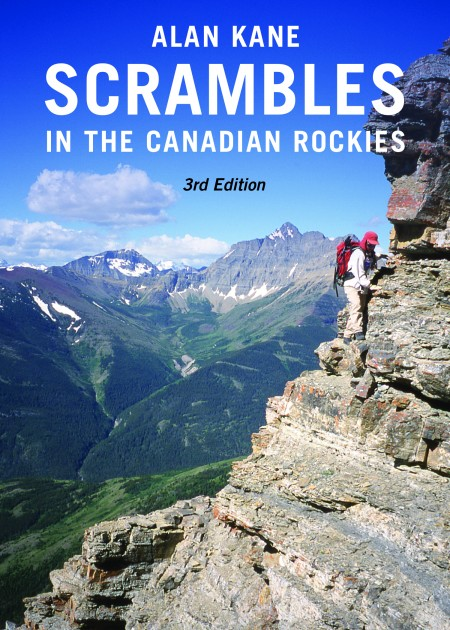
Scrambles in the Canadian Rockies (2016), by Alan Kane

Climbing guidebooks are used by mountaineers, alpinists, ice climbers, and rock climbers to locate, determine grades, and navigate climbing routes on mountains, climbing crags, or bouldering areas. Modern route guidebooks include detailed information on each climbing route, including topo diagrams, route beta, protection requirements, and the ethics and style that are in place for a given climbing area (e.g. can sport-climbing bolts be used, or must the protection be temporary and removable as with traditional climbing).

Modern climbing guidebooks are increasingly available in digital format, and even as searchable smartphone apps with extensive beta and three-dimensional diagrams of routes and their crux movements. While digital guidebooks and online databases of climbing routes now exist, the publication of physical guidebooks that can be taken on climbs is still ongoing given the unique demands of climbing—many guidebook publishers have both a physical and online edition.

Climbing route guidebooks began to proliferate at the turn of the 20th century in Europe and became an important chronicle of the history and stories of climbing areas and routes (e.g. who made the first free ascent). These guidebooks played an important part in promoting the sport of climbing and of the attractiveness of particular climbing areas. Certain notable guidebooks played an important role in standardizing the technical grading systems that are now widely in use today around the world.

== Content and information ==
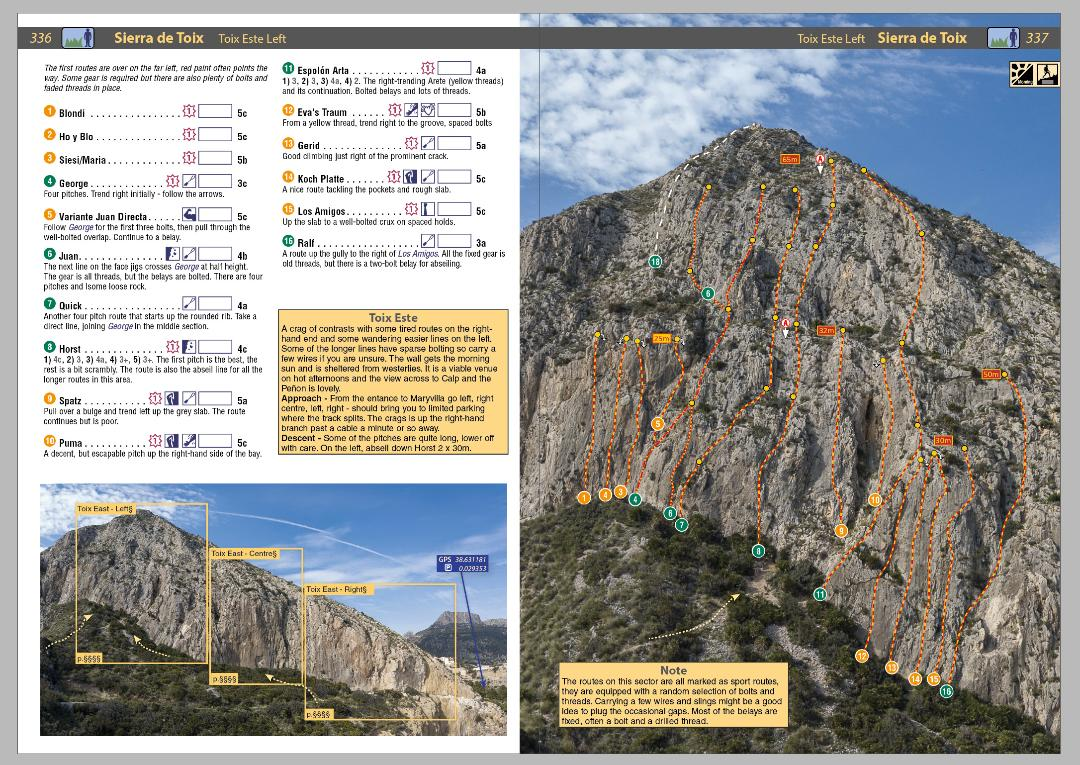
Topo image of the cliff Toix Est in Costa Blanca in Spain, by climber Chris Craggs from a Rockfax guidebook

Before discussing individual routes, a climbing guidebook will outline the history and status of climbing norms applicable for the location including for example whether the use of bolts for sport climbing is allowed, and other local customs (e.g. use of non-clean aid climbing techniques), and the legal position on access to the location.

Guidebooks can locate a route by verbal description (for example: start in the third left-facing corner below the large, orange roof, left of the route "Something Interesting"). From the 1970s, a diagram style was developed, with detailed diagrams (or photographs) of the routes with the key obstacles and challenges encountered explicitly marked/overlaid, which came to be called "topos" (see image opposite).

Modern guidebooks include a range of standard details for each specific route, including the length of a route and its climbing grade. The description can also include varying amounts of information about how to climb the route, such as the location of the crux and any special techniques needed (e.g. bridging, laybacking, or the need for aid climbing)—when the information on how to climb a route is very detailed it is collectively known as beta, and can affect the style of the ascent (e.g. onsighting). The guidebook may also include the type of equipment needed and particularly for climbing protection. In a comprehensive guide, the route's history (e.g. credits for first free ascents) would also be included.

In 2022, two Austrian climbers published Klimafreundlich Klettern (or Sustainable Climbing), a guidebook on the Tyrol whose climbing routes could be accessed via public transport or bicycle, thus reducing the carbon footprint of the climbers.

=== Sandbagging ===
The grading of modern climbing routes is increasingly concentrated around a small number of dominant systems, such as the Yosemite Decimal System and the V-scale in North America, and the French sport system and Font-scale in Europe. An aspect of climbing guidebooks is the consistency of applying these dominant grading systems with that of other climbing areas and guidebooks so that visiting climbers to an area can accurately assess the scale of a route's challenge. Where a guidebook's grades are materially 'easier' than what they should be, it is known as sandbagging.

Sandbagging is a source of debate amongst climbers, with some considering it a source of unnecessary danger to visiting climbers and others considering it a reflection of local customs and historical grading that should be preserved in guidebook grades. Certain climbing areas are notable for systemic sandbagging (i.e. most of the grades in their guidebooks understate the true difficulty of their routes), with examples in North America being Yosemite, Shawangunk Ridge (the "Gunks"), and Eldorado Canyon. Some guidebooks will try to alert the reader of sandbagged routes, and sometimes with more subtle wordings to avoid upsetting local climbers such as "High in the grade".

== Publication and authorship ==
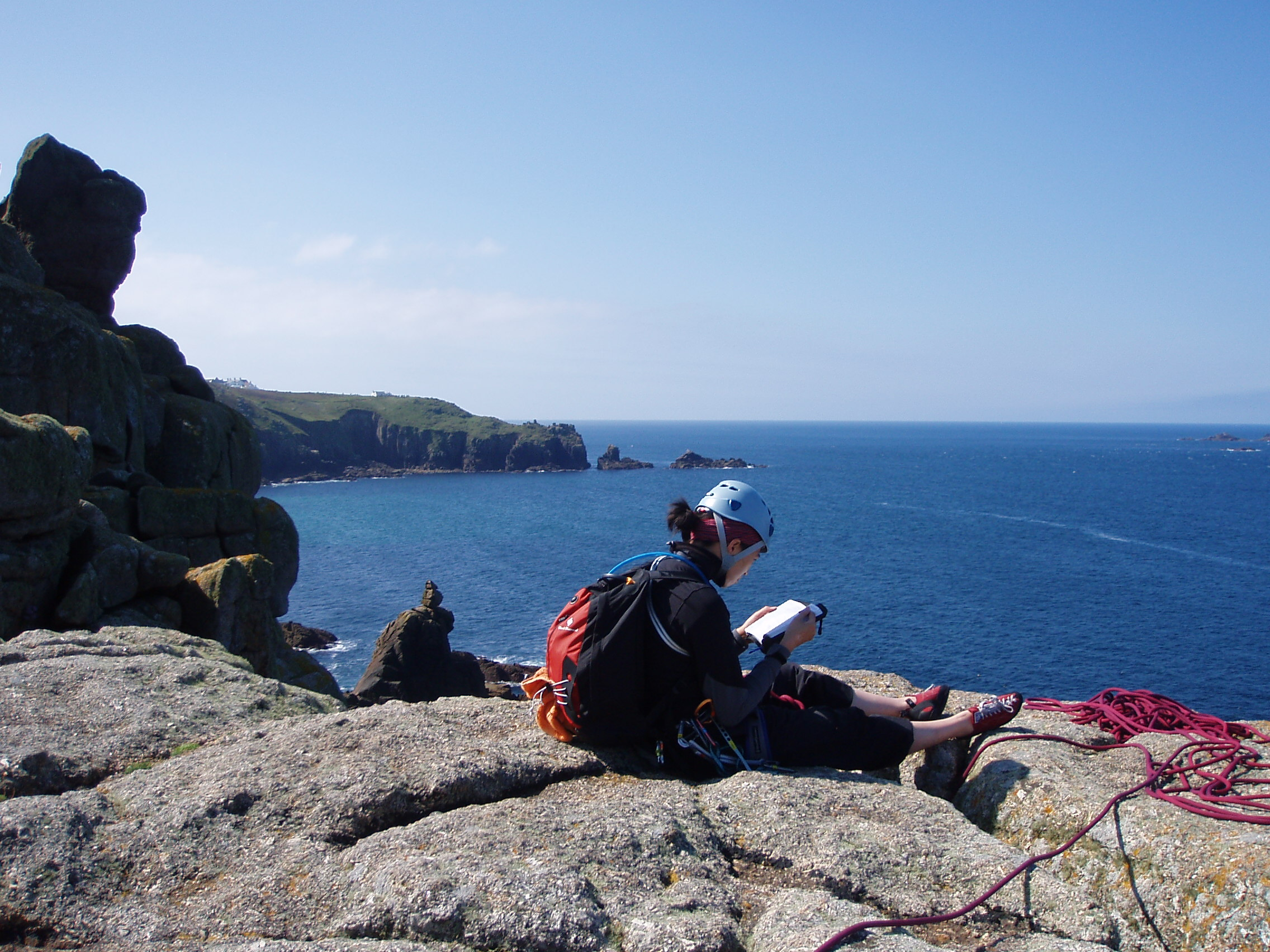
Climber checking their 'physical' guidebook at the top of a rock-climbing route at Sennen Cove, Cornwall

Guidebooks may be compilations of selected popular or well-regarded routes (e.g. Fifty Classic Climbs of North America or Hard Rock), or exhaustive compilations of all known climbing routes in a region (e.g. the 512-page Lancashire Rock in Britain). The books may be published by national/regional mountaineering bodies (e.g. the British Mountaineering Council (BMC) and Climbers' Club in Britain, the Club Alpino Italiano in Italy, or the Sierra Club in the US), by commercial publishers, or self-published by local enthusiasts who start to share knowledge on their climbing areas. The interface between volunteer and professional publishers is not always smooth, and in 2001 for example, the BMC came close to litigation with Rockfax on concerns that they had copied the BMC's work in compiling a guidebook for a climbing area.

Regardless of publication, in many cases, the authorship of the climbing guidebook will explicitly (e.g. named on the front cover), or implicitly (listed as contributors/advisors), include well-regarded climbers who are associated with the climbing area in question. There are notable climbing guidebook authors who are not associated with a single area, but whose authorship and climbing insights are equally well-regarded, examples being Britain's Ken Wilson, and America's Steve Roper, who wrote many notable climbing guidebooks for a wide range of locations and types of rock in their respective countries.

As a climbing area develops, new editions of the guidebook for the area will be published to capture the details of new climbing routes, to update details for existing routes, and in particular to show any change in the consensus grade of existing climbing routes. The task of re-grading existing climbs, and ensuring that the guidebook accurately and fairly reflects the assessments of respected climbers in the area, which need to be consensus-driven, is difficult. The grading system is itself not an exact science and different climbers, for various reasons including their own physique and climbing style, will perceive the challenges differently. This can lead to longer debates and to some climbing guidebook authors proposing using "slash grades" (e.g., quoting a range). Between physical guidebook editions, new routes updates and proposed their grades are often held on online databases.

=== Digital guidebooks ===
In recent years, many climbing guidebooks have been published in digital format, often for display in smartphone applications as apps. This medium offers the benefit of continuous updates, as well as rapid searching, and in some cases, GPS navigation and three dimensional diagrams. There are now several major online climbing route databases including The Crag and Mountain Project, however, climbing authors note that the need for physical guidebooks that can be carried by climbers to (often) remote crags remains (many have physical and online editions).

== Influence and notable books ==
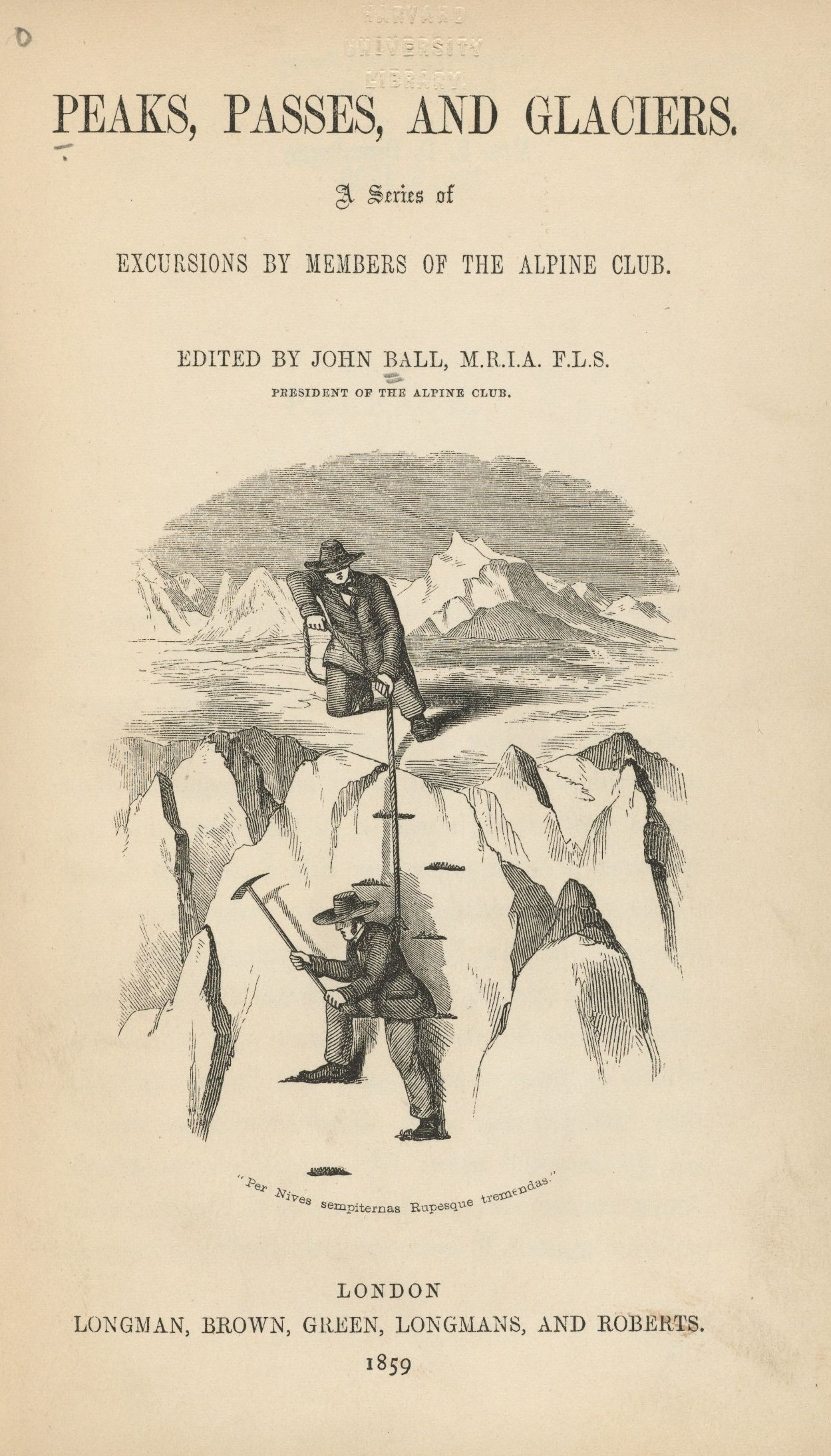
Title page from Peaks, Passes, and Glaciers (1859), edited by John Ball, first president of the Alpine Club

The earliest climbing guidebooks date back to the mid-19th century and the Golden Age of Alpinism, with the British Alpine Club's Peaks, Passes, and Glaciers in 1859 being one of the earliest published guidebooks dedicated to climbing. Climbing guidebooks became an important part of developing the culture of climbing, and the promotion of the activity as a sport, and they became increasingly common by the turn of the 20th century in Europe and after World War Two in North America.

As well as promoting an area to outside climbers, guidebooks chronicle the history of climbing areas and notable climbing routes, and delineate what is considered to be good and acceptable style in the area and what is not acceptable (e.g use of sport climbing bolts). There have been instances where local climbers have strongly objected to the publication of a guidebook due to differences in opinion on local climbing ethics, and/or the prospect of attracting increased visitors (e.g. at Pikes Peak in Colorado).

Certain guidebooks had a significant impact on the standardization of climbing and the adoption of grading systems in particular. For example, Steve Roper's 1964 big wall climbing guidebook, A Climber's Guide to Yosemite Valley, cemented the nascent Yosemite Decimal System as the dominant grading system in North America. Similarly, John Sherman's 1991 bouldering guidebook Hueco Tanks Climbing and Bouldering Guide introduced the V-scale to American bouldering, where it became the dominant system.

Climbing guidebooks that are considered historically notable include:

=== British Isles ===
The Climbs on Lliwedd (1909) by J. M. Archer Thomson and A. W. Andrews, is Britain's (and possibly the world's) first rock-climbing guidebook.

- The Climbs on Lliwedd (1909); first rock climbing guidebook in Britain (e.g., pictures of specific routes and not just essays on days spent rock climbing), and is possibly the first worldwide.
- Some Gritstone Climbs (1913); regarded as "the first pocket climbing guidebook".
- Hard Rock (1974).

=== Continental European ===
- Peaks, Passes, and Glaciers. A Series of Excursions by the Members of the Alpine Club (1859).
- Alpine Club Guide (German: Alpenvereinsführer, commonly shortened to AV Führer or AVF).
- Guida dei Monti d'Italia (in English Guidebook to the Italian mountains).

=== North American ===
- A Climber's Guide to the Teton Range (1956).
- A Climber's Guide to Yosemite Valley (1964).
- Fifty Classic Climbs of North America (1979).
- Hueco Tanks Climbing and Bouldering Guide (1991).

== Libraries and collections ==
Several mountaineering organizations maintain extensive libraries and collections of current and historical climbing guidebooks, including the British Mountaineering Council, who in 2012, compiled an updated British and Irish Climbing Guidebooks (1894 to 2011) that contained over 1,000 entries.

The library of the American Alpine Club is also noted for its collection of climbing guidebooks. Although not a classical climbing guidebook per se, a noted online database of information on climbing routes in the Himalayas—including verified ascensionists and the route taken—is the late Elizabeth Hawley's The Himalayan Database.

== Awards ==
The Banff Mountain Book Festival has at times given a 'Best Guidebook Award' for outstanding guidebooks.

== See also ==
- Grade (climbing)
- Climbing route
- Climbing technique
