= Gurkarpo Ri =

Mountain in Nepal and China

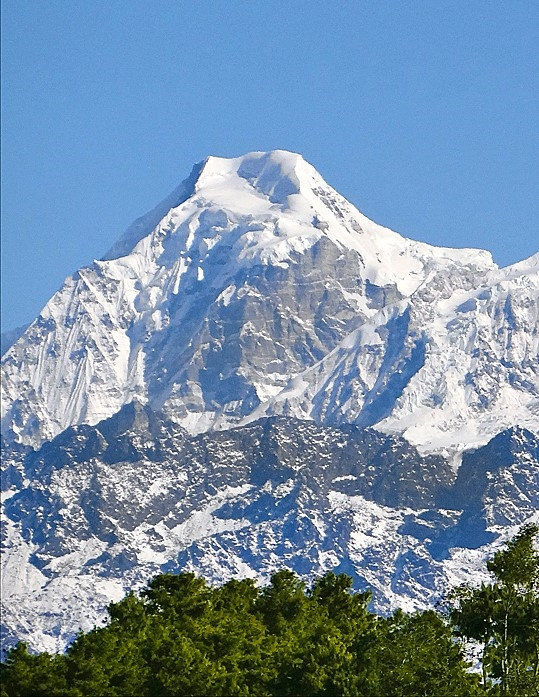
- South aspect (Nepali side)

Highest point
- Elevation: 6,891 m (22,608 ft)
- Prominence: 651 m (2,136 ft)
- Parent peak: Loenpo Gang
- Isolation: 2.9 km (1.8 mi)
- Coordinates: 28°12′36″N 85°46′22″E

Geography
- Location within Nepal Location within Tibet Location within China
- Interactive map of Gurkarpo Ri
- Location: China–Nepal border
- Countries: Nepal and China
- Province: Bagmati
- District: Rasuwa
- Protected area: Langtang National Park; Qomolangma National Nature Preserve
- Parent range: Himalayas; Jugal Himal

Climbing
- First ascent: 2007
- Easiest route: West Ridge

Gurkarpo Ri is a mountain in Nepal and Tibet.

== Description ==
Gurkarpo Ri is a 6,891-metre (22,608-foot) glaciated summit in the Himalayas on the China–Nepal border. It is situated 65 kilometres (40 mi) northeast of Kathmandu on the boundary shared by Langtang National Park and Qomolangma National Nature Preserve. Precipitation runoff from the mountain's south and west slopes drains to the Trishuli River via Lānṭān Kholā, whereas the northeast slope drains into tributaries of the Bhotekoshi River. Topographic relief is significant as the summit rises 1,700 metres (5,577 ft) above the Langshisha Glacier in 1.5 kilometres (0.93 mi). The first ascent of the summit was made on November 1, 2007, by Paulo Grobel, Pierre-Olivier Dupuy, Marc Kia, and Jean Francois Males via a route this French team named Some More Rice? on the West Ridge. Prior unsuccessful attempts were made first by Koreans in 1993, Japanese (1998), Germans (1999), and Koreans again in 2001 and 2003.

== Climate ==
Based on the Köppen climate classification, Gurkarpo Ri is located in a tundra climate zone with cold, snowy winters, and cool summers. Weather systems coming off the Bay of Bengal are forced upwards by the Himalaya mountains (orographic lift), causing heavy precipitation in the form of rainfall and snowfall. Mid-June through early-August is the monsoon season. The months of April, May, September, and October offer the most favorable weather for viewing or climbing this peak.

== See also ==
- Geology of the Himalayas
- List of Himalayan peaks and passes

== Gallery ==
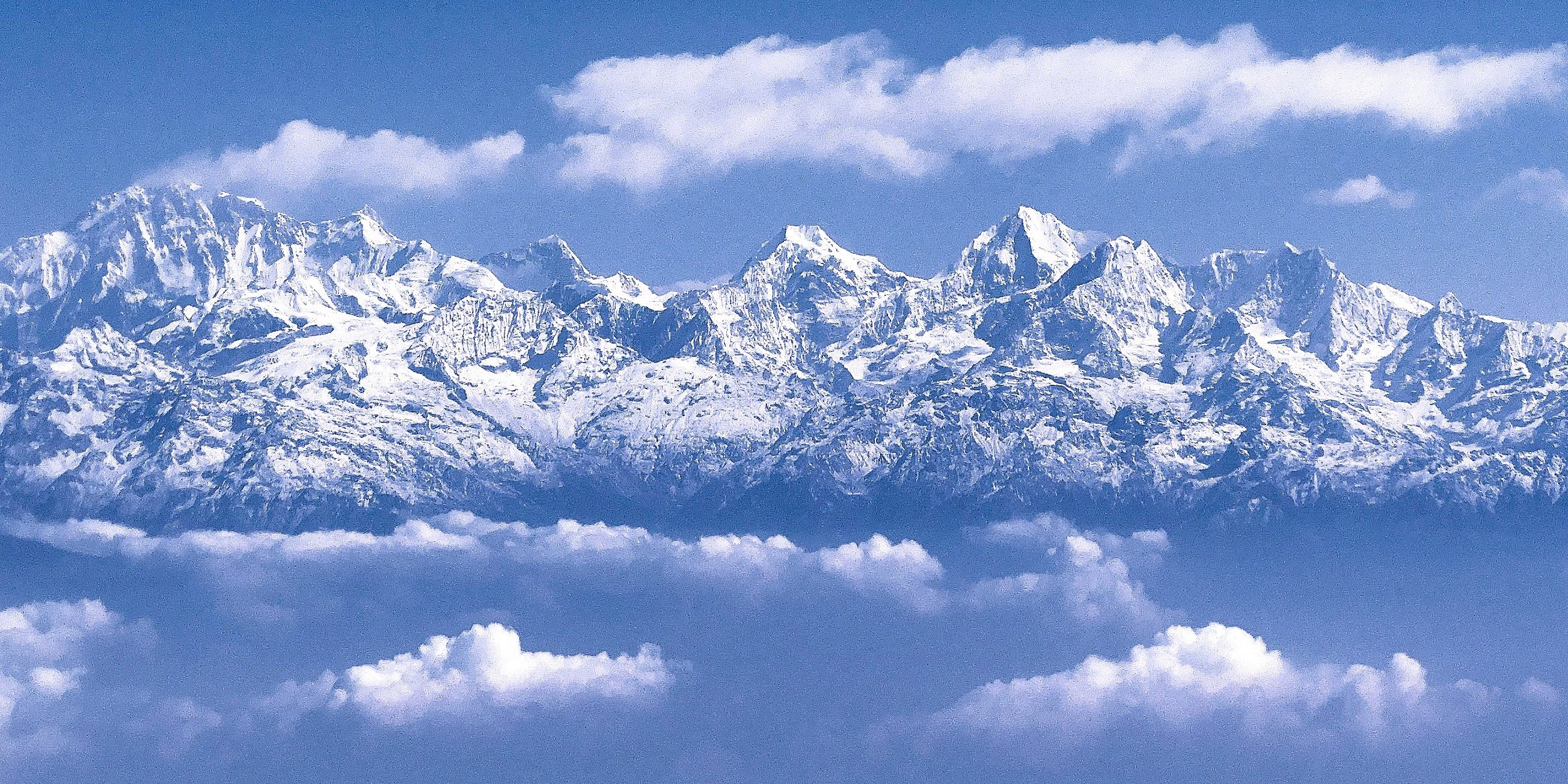
Shishapangma (left), Gurkarpo Ri (center), Dorje Lhakpa (right)
