= Panch Pokhari =

Group of five lakes in Sindhupalchowk District, Nepal

Panch Pokharii
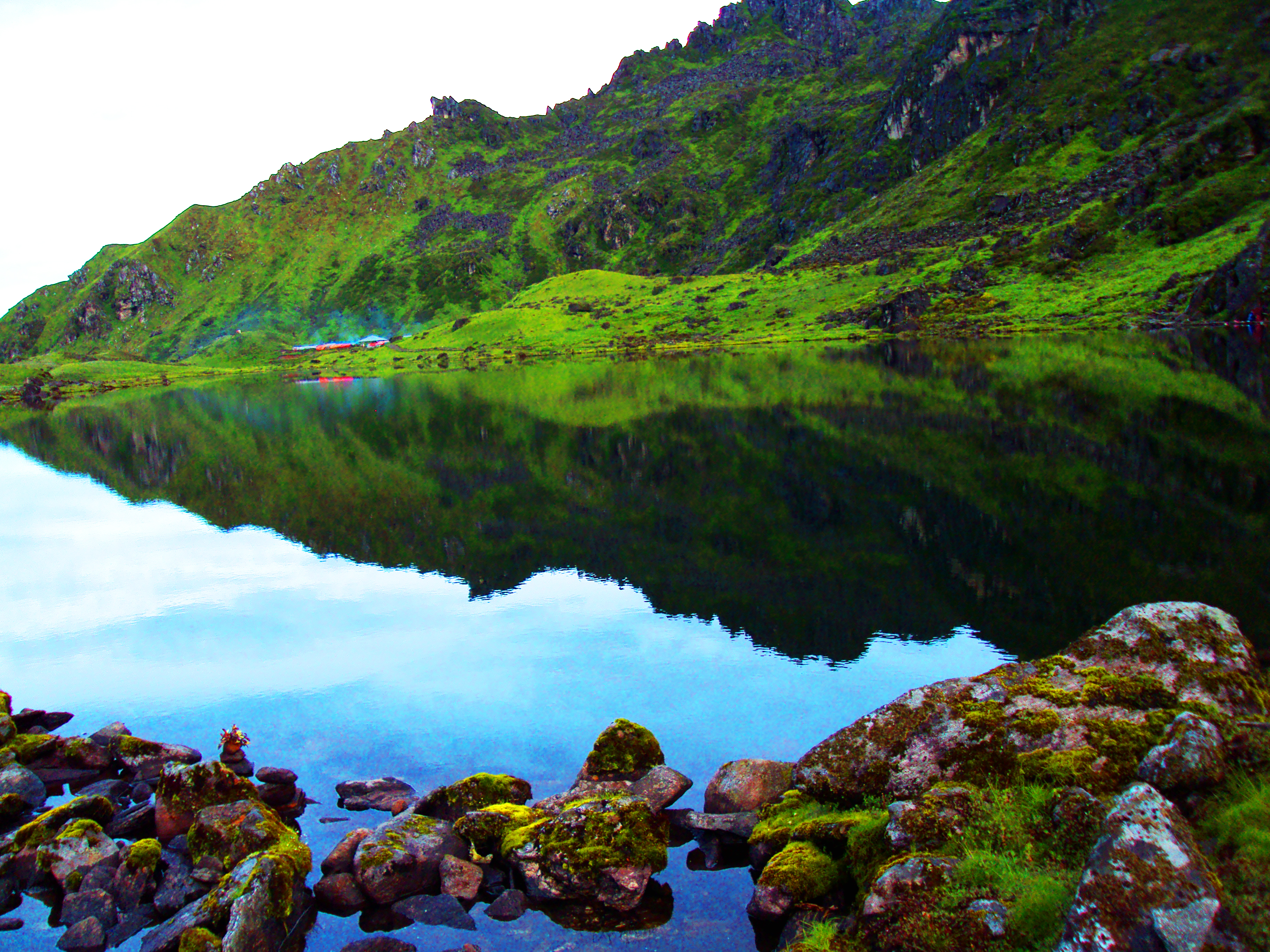
- Panch Pokhari

- Location within Nepal
- Location: Bhotang, Sindhupalchowk District
- Coordinates: 28.042°N 85.716°E
- Type: fresh water
- Primary outflows: Indravati River
- Basin countries: Nepal
- Surface elevation: 4,100 m (13,500 ft)

Panch Pokhari ([pãt͡s pokʰʌɾi]) is a group of 5 (panch) Hindu holy lakes in the Sindhupalchowk District of Nepal. The lakes are a popular destination for Hindu and Buddhist pilgrims during Janai Purnima.

== About ==
Panch Pokhari is one of the main features of Langtang National Park, located in the Nuwakot, Rasuwa and Sindhulpalchok districts of the central Himalayan region.

The Government of Nepal's Postal Services Department issued a stamp featuring Pokhari in 2011.

Panch Pokhari is situated at an elevation of about 4,100 m above sea level. This is a famous Hindu pilgrimage site in Nepal. Panch Pokhari trekking lies to the north of the Kathmandu valley; the chain of peaks called Jugal Himal that includes Dorje Lhakpa (6,966 m), Madiya (6,257 m) and Phurbi Chhyachu (6,637 m). This is a remote and unfrequented region, despite being close to Kathmandu.

The lakes comprise one of Nepal's many high-altitude wetlands (HAW), but it is not listed as a Ramsar site.

== Gallery ==
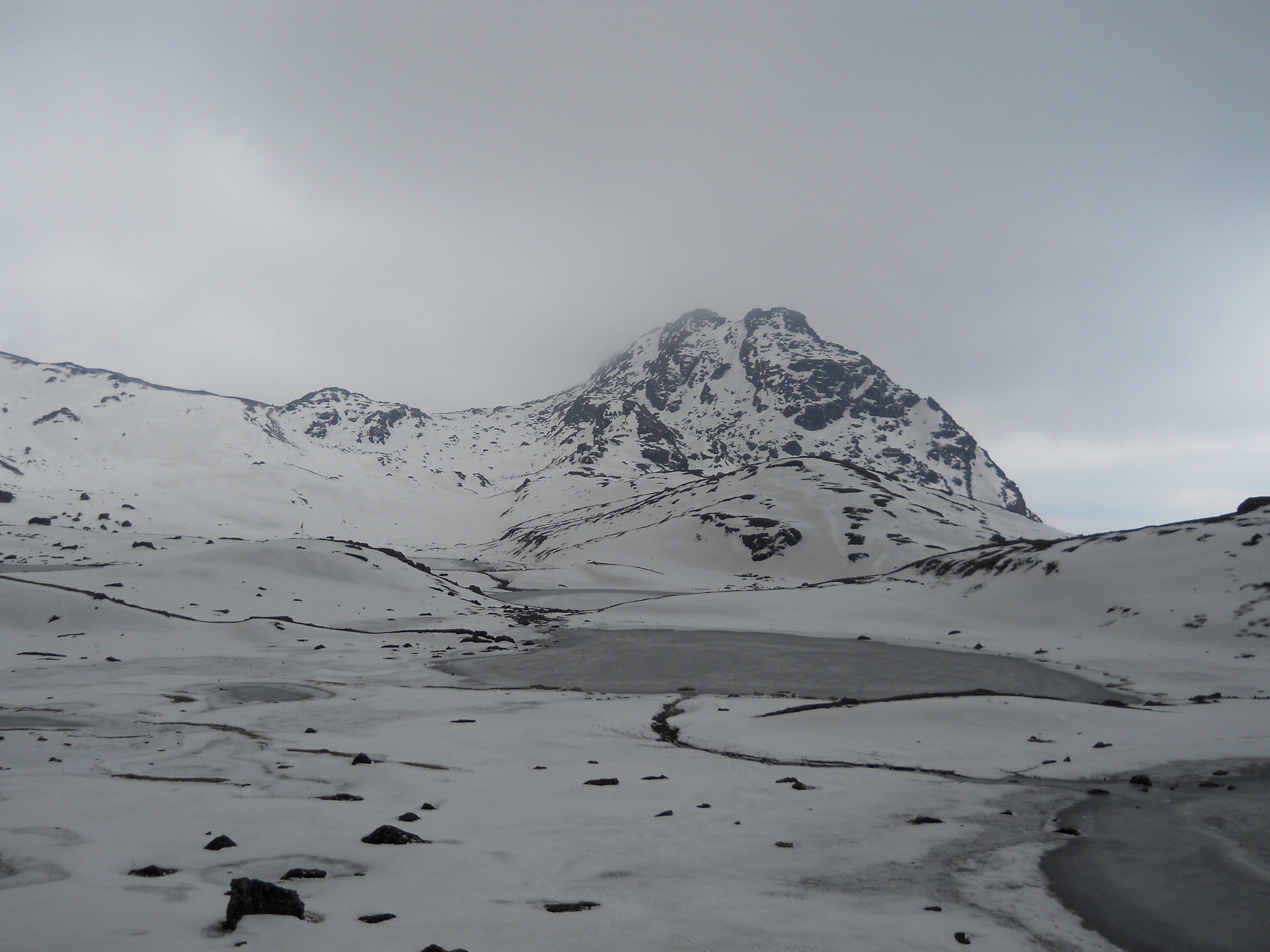
View of Frozen Panch Pokhari

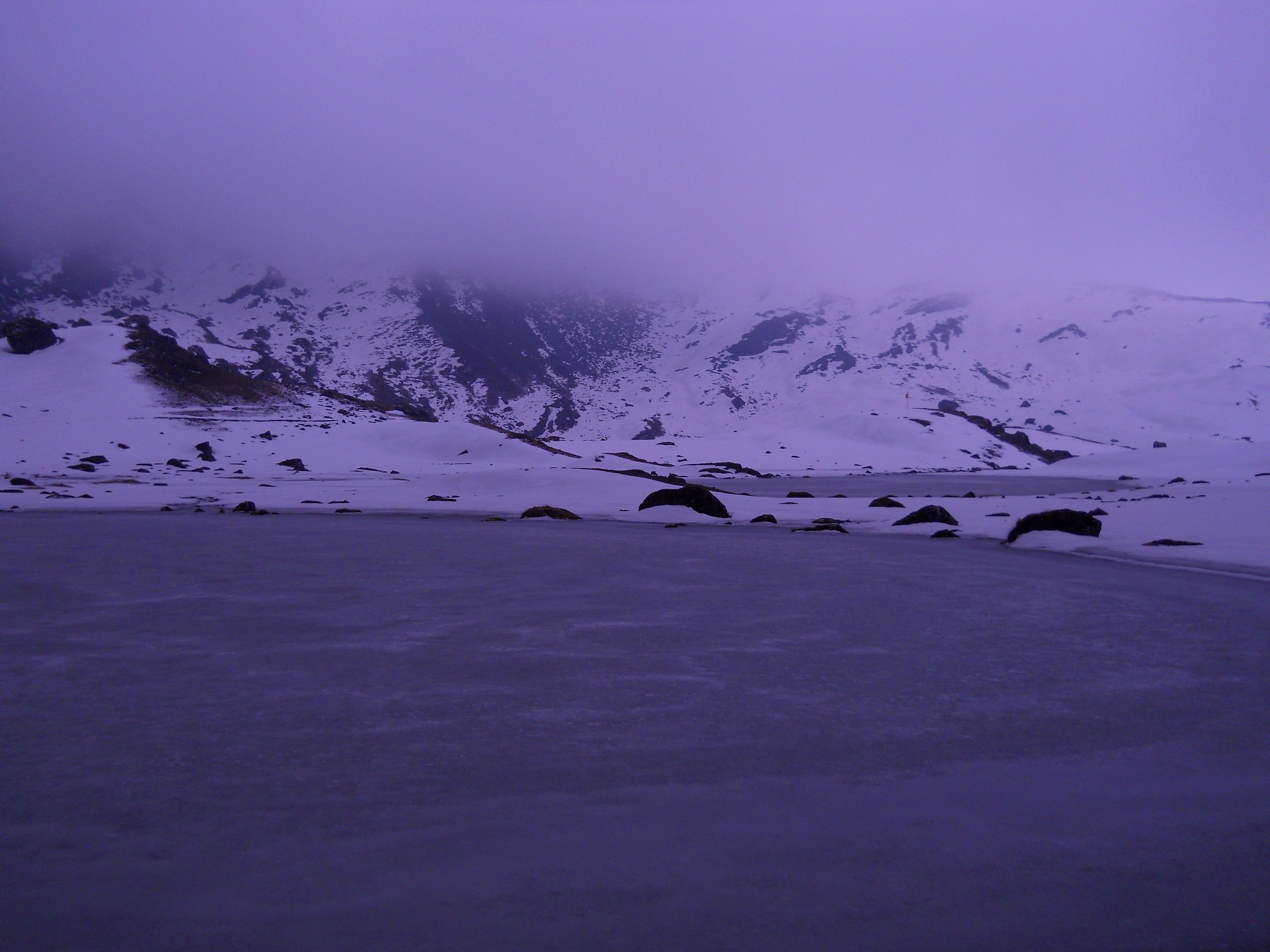
PanchPokhari

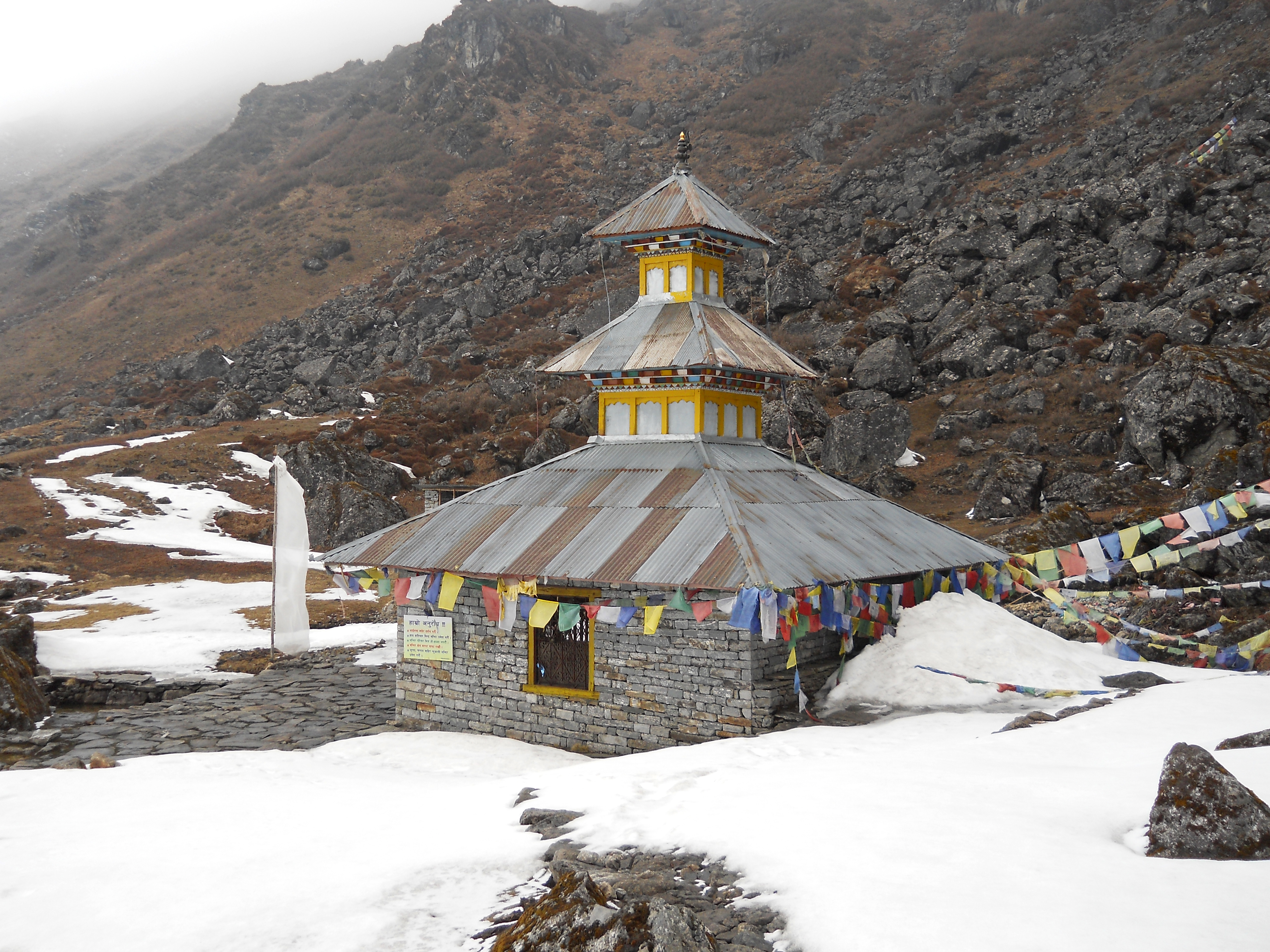
PanchPokhariTemple

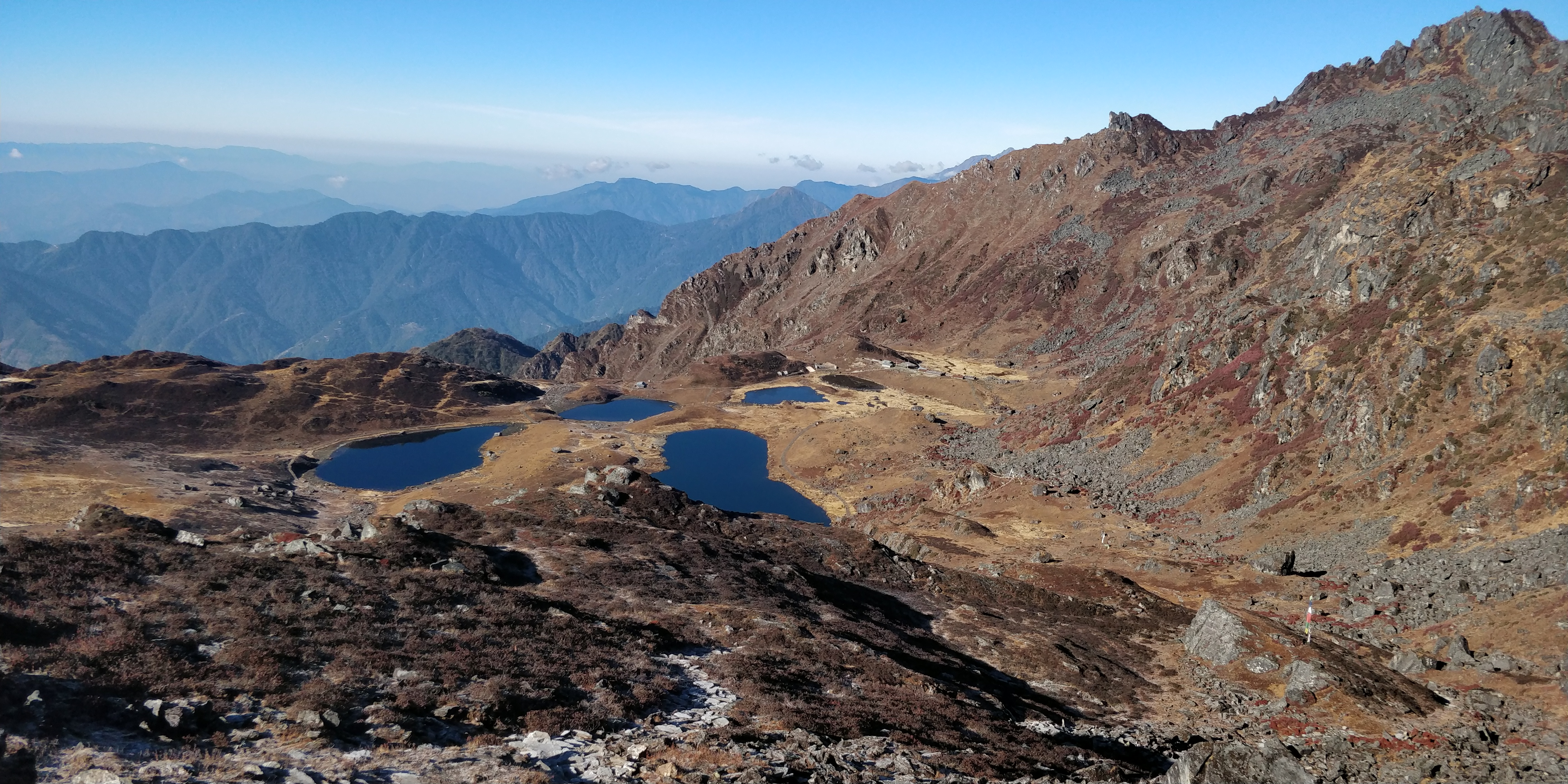
PanchPokhari

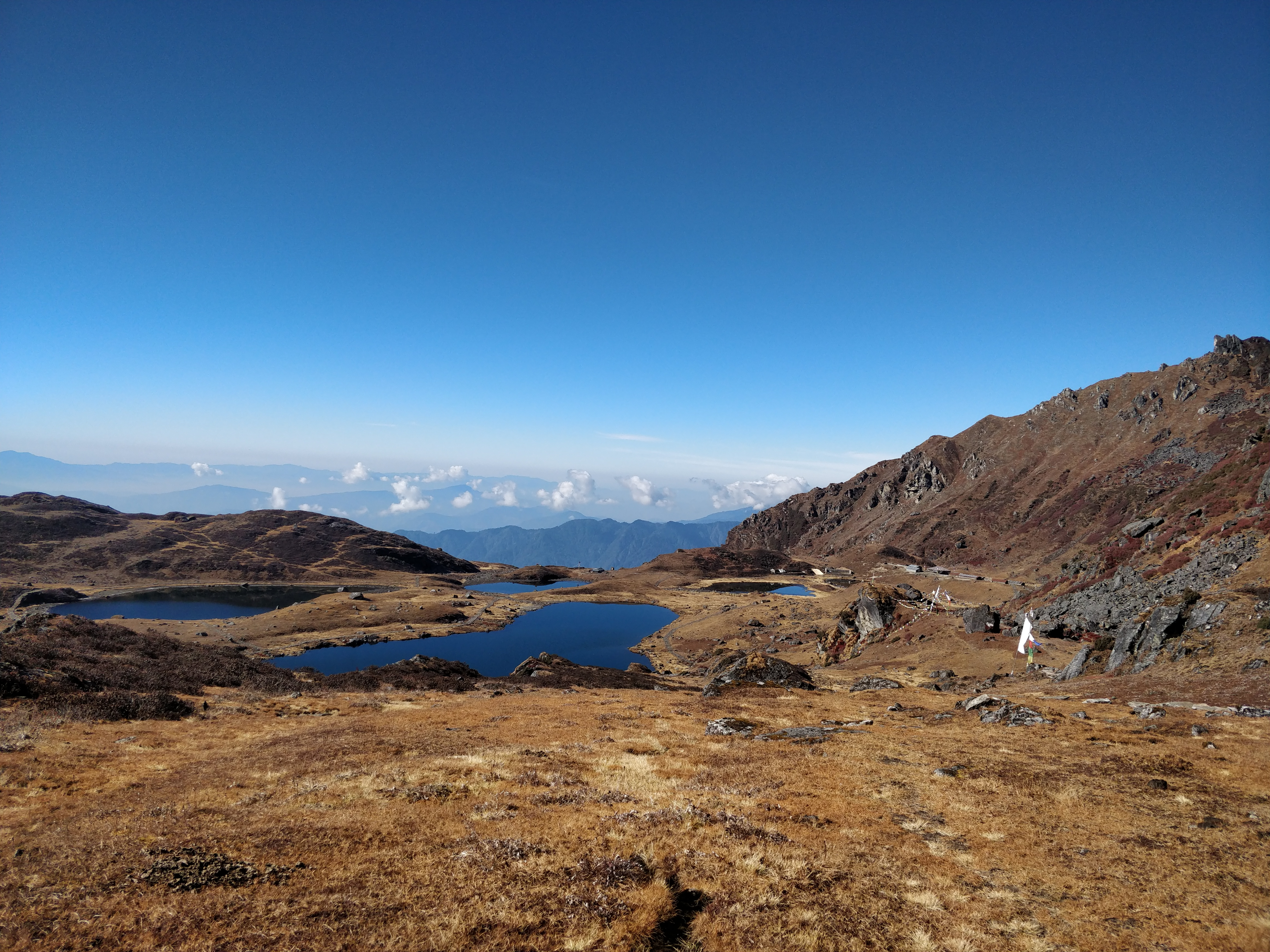
PanchPokhari

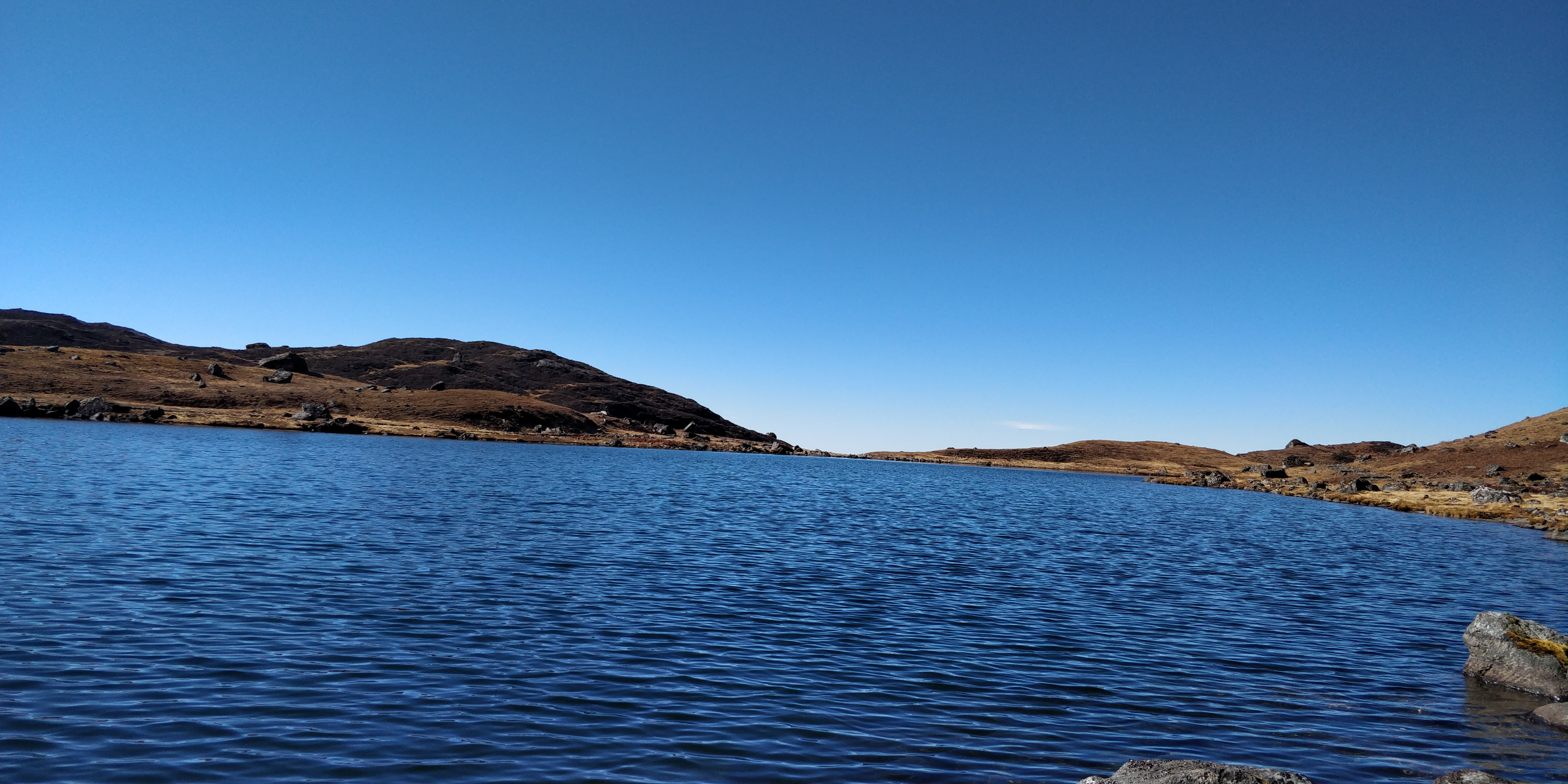
PanchPokhari

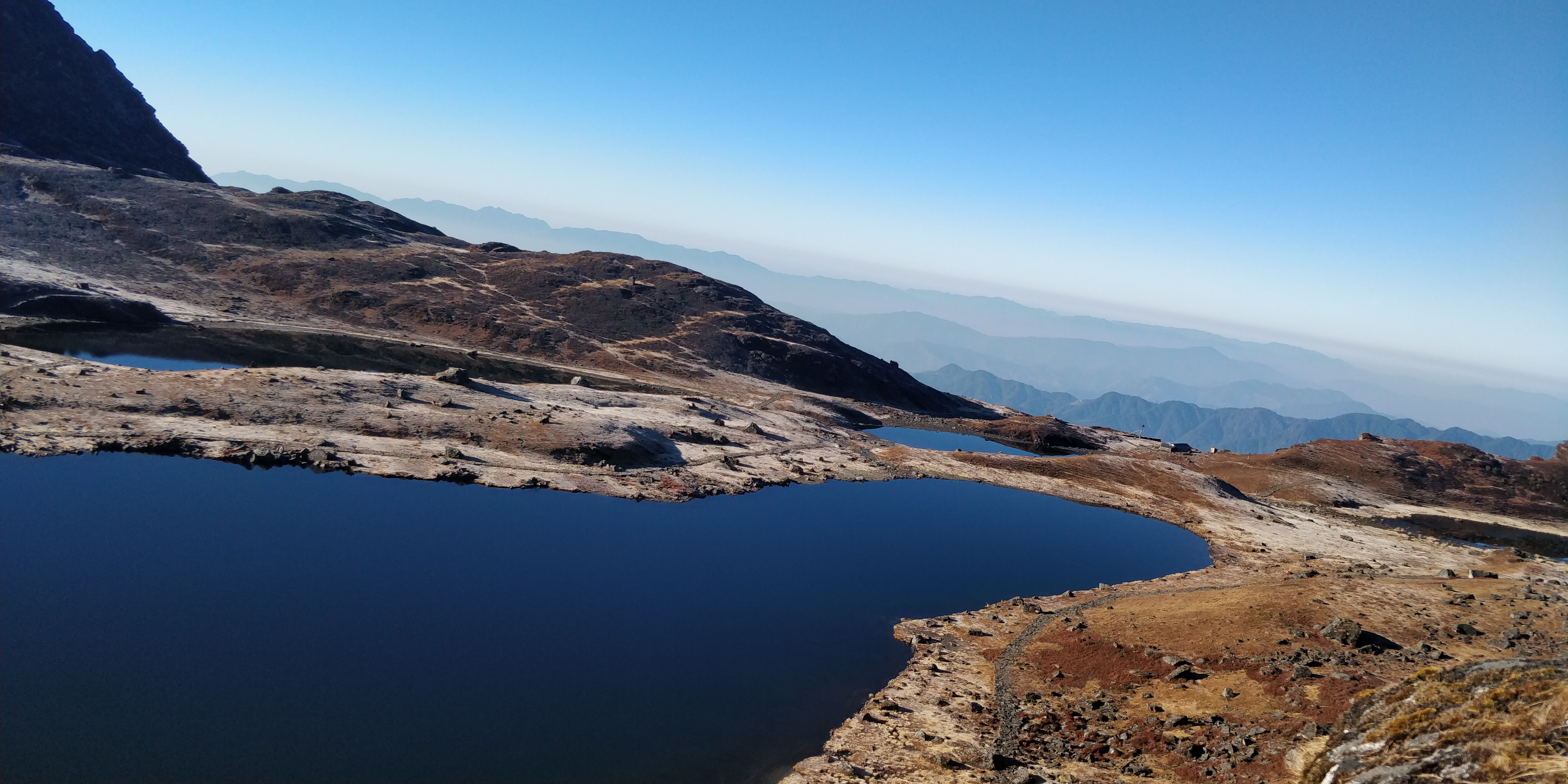
PanchPokhari
