= Lancashire Rock =

British rock climbing guidebook

Lancashire Rock is the official climbing guidebook for rock climbing in Lancashire. Originally published in 1969 by Rocksport, under the editorship of Phil Watkin. The 1969 edition was compiled by Les Ainsworth with assistance from a number of supporting volunteers. There have since been several revisions to the guidebook since the first edition, and the latest revision contains some 6,600 climbing routes either in a quarry or on a crag and making it one of the biggest climbing guidebooks in the UK. The current edition was published by the British Mountaineering Council, although future editions of the guidebook are now under the control of a new editorial team and a new edition is expected to be published in 2025.
