= Phurbi Chyachu =

Mountain in Nepal

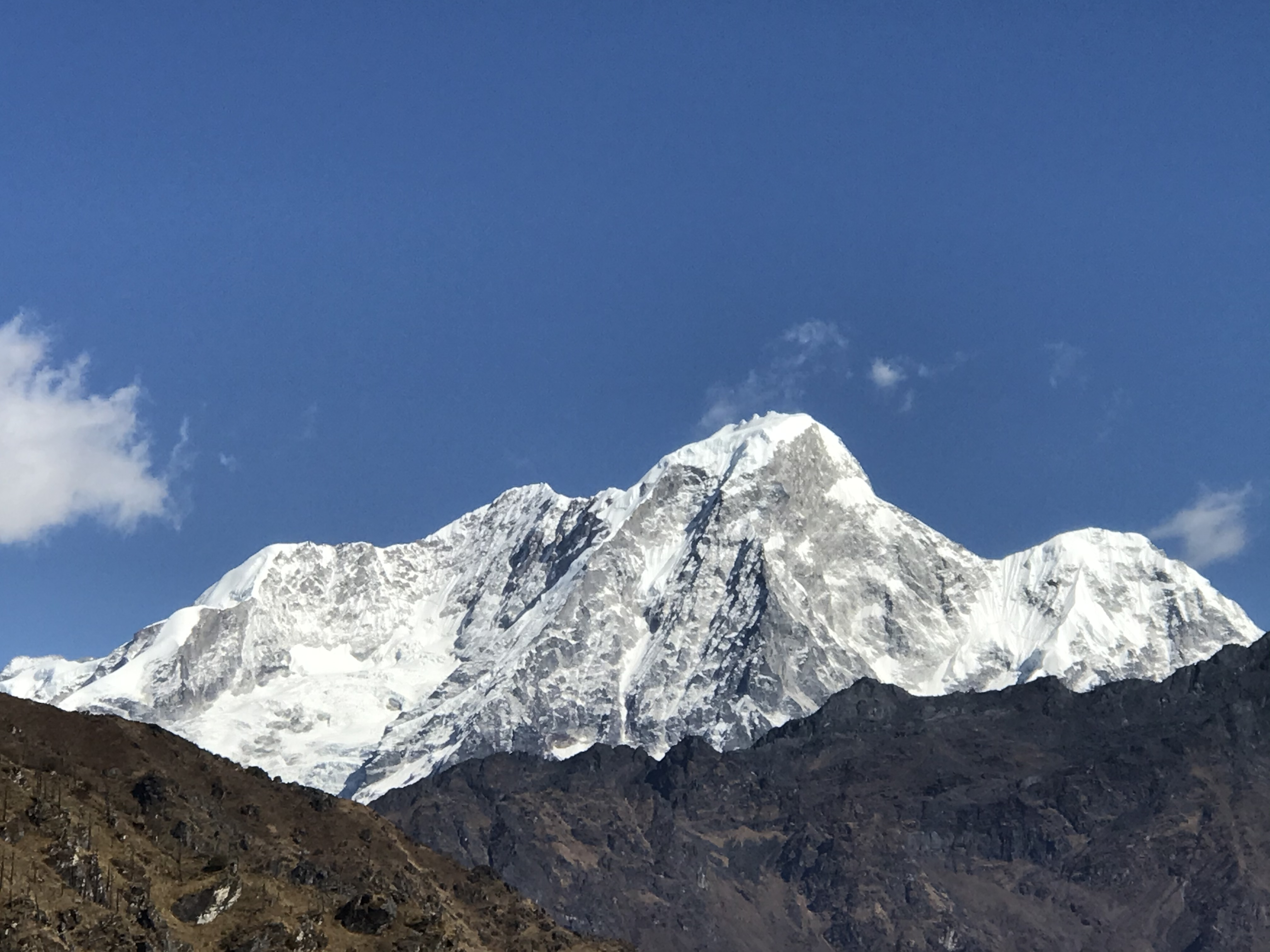
- Phurbi Chhyachu (Jugal Himal) view from Panch Pokhari, Nepal, 14 October 2019

Highest point
- Elevation: 6637
- Coordinates: 28°07′50″N 85°52′19″E

Naming
- Native name: फुर्बी च्याचु

Geography
- Location within Nepal Location within Tibet Location within China Location within Asia
- Country: Nepal
- Parent range: Himalayas

Phurbi Chyachu (also known as Phurbi Chhyachu and Purbi Gyachu) is a mountain peak in the Himalayas on the border of Nepal and the Tibet Autonomous Region.

== Location ==
The peak is located at 6,637 m (21,775 ft), north west of Sino-Nepal border crossing at Kodari, near Tatopani.

== Climbing history ==
The first ascent was made on May 1, 1982, by a Japanese expedition consisting of Shintaro Kurokawa, Fumihito Ogawa, Hiromitsu Okamoto, Takashi Shingaki, Hajime Takigami, Ang Phuri Lama, and Pemba Lama Sherpa.
