= A Climber's Guide to the Teton Range =

1996 mountaineering guidebook

- Book cover, first edition
- Author: Leigh N. Ortenburger
- Publisher: Sierra Club
- Publication date: 1 January 1956

A Climber's Guide to the Teton Range is a mountain climbing guidebook by Leigh N. Ortenburger and Reynold G. Jackson. The third edition was published in 1996 by The Mountaineers of Seattle, Washington. A fourth edition was published in 2023. The book details the approaches and routes to hundreds of climbs in the Teton Range, most of which are in Grand Teton National Park in Wyoming. It is a comprehensive guide to climbing in the region and includes background material including the climate, geology, and climbing history of the Teton Range.

Dalton Johnson from Men's Journal called the book the Teton guide book I wish I had, and the book is on the recommended reading list of the National Park Service. The American Alpine Club describes it as exhaustive but “warm,” deeply evocative of a splendid scene, and striving earnestly to tell us everything.
