= Fred Pigott =

English rock climber (1895 – 28 July 1979)

Alfred Sefton "Fred" Pigott (1895 – 28 July 1979) was a leading English rock climber of the 1920s and 1930s.

== Personal life ==
Fred Pigott attended Manchester Grammar School and in World War I joined the Royal Fusiliers. While serving as a sniper, he received a gangrenous wound that deformed his hand and caused his discharge from the army. He became a sugar merchant in Stockport and had two sons, Geoffrey and Hugh, with his wife Frances.

== Climbing ==
Pigott climbed extensively with Morley Wood, mostly leading. They pioneered many routes in the Peak District including Stanage Edge and The Roaches and he later moved to mountains including new routes at Glen Coe, Ben Nevis, the Inaccessible Pinnacle and the 3rd ascent of the central buttress of Scafell in 1923. Pigott's Climb (VS, 5a, 1924) on the East Buttress of Clogwyn Du'r Arddu set new standards for exposure. Jack Longland wrote 'it was impossible to ruffle him or to imagine him flustered, much less frightened'.

Pigott was a member of The Rucksack Club including being its president for two years and on its committee from 1921 to 1971 without interruption. He was a pioneer with Morley Wood of using natural chockstones and later machine nuts for protection. He wrote a chapter in the book Recent Developments on Gritstone.

Fred Pigott was involved in mountain rescue and, from 1932, the Mountain Rescue Committee becoming secretary, chairman and president. He received the OBE for services to the Mountain Rescue Committee in the 1964 New Year Honours.
