= Yorkshire Ramblers' Club =

Mountaineering club in England

The Yorkshire Ramblers' Club (YRC) was founded in Leeds on 6 October 1892. It is the second-oldest mountaineering club in England (the oldest being the Alpine Club), and the UK's oldest caving club, active in mountaineering and caving in the United Kingdom and internationally.

The club’s purpose is to enable “…experienced hillwalkers, scramblers, climbers, mountaineers, ski-tourers, snowshoers, cavers and explorers who want to meet like-minded individuals to pursue their chosen activities in the UK and abroad.”

== History ==
On 13 July 1892 four Yorkshire gentlemen met at the home of Herbert Slater in Leeds to discuss the idea of forming a club for individuals interested in promoting the idea of walking and the study of the countryside. At an open meeting held at the Skyrack Inn, Headingley on 6 October 1892 it was unanimously decided to form a club to organise walking and mountaineering expeditions and encourage the study of nature. The name of the club was picked from others including The Three Peaks Club, but "Yorkshire understatement prevailed" and the name Yorkshire Ramblers' Club was chosen. From the club’s beginning, members were meeting in “…Switzerland, for instance, and greater attention was paid to climbing in the Lake District, North Wales, and other mountainous parts of the British Isles.”

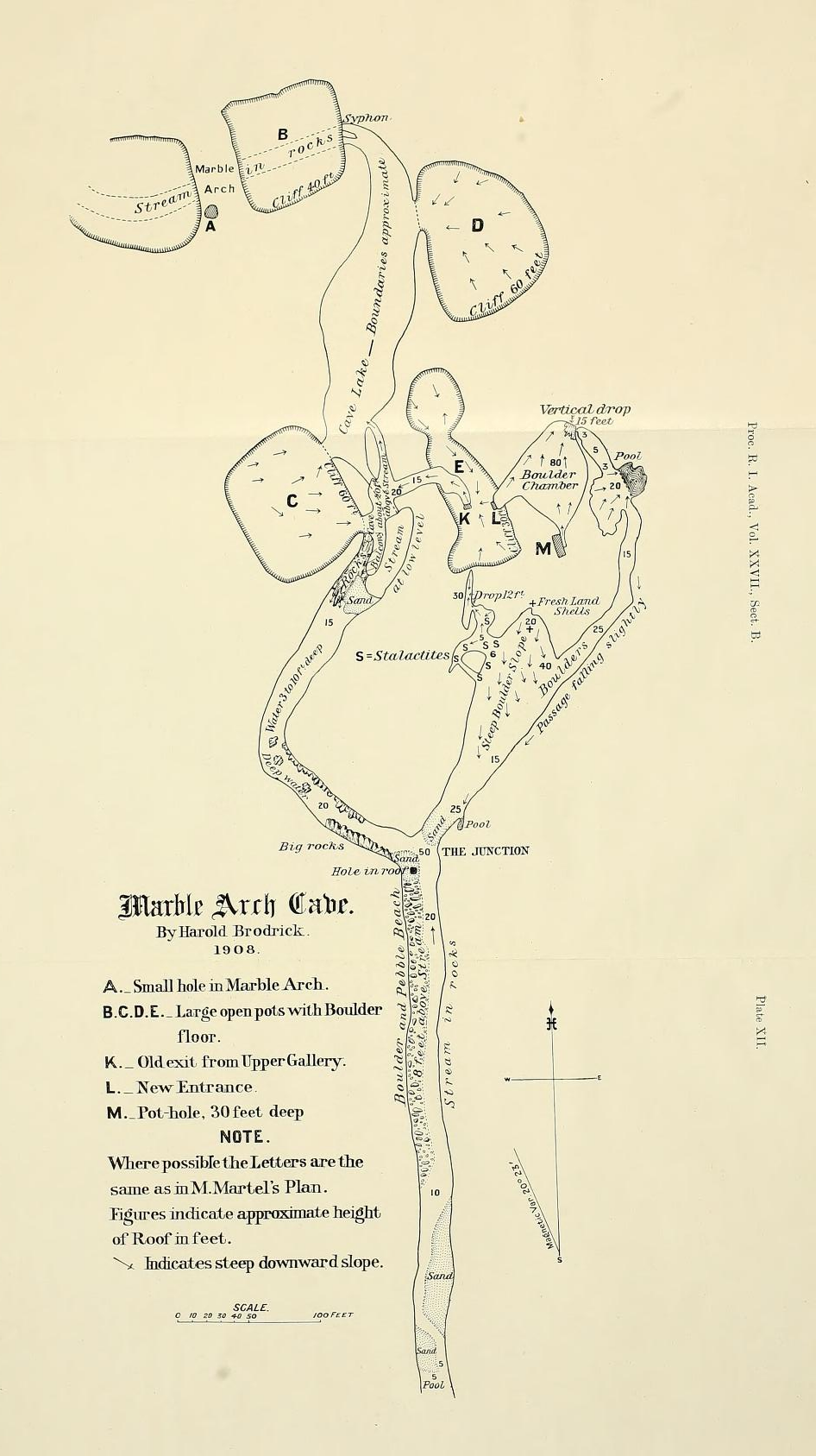
Club member Harold Brodrick published a survey of Marble Arch Cave in scientific journals in 1909.

== Cave exploration ==
YRC members were major exponents of early cave exploration in Great Britain and in Ireland. From 1907, YRC members took a close interest in County Fermanagh, Ireland (later Northern Ireland) with occasional forays into Counties Leitrim and Cavan. Their work included surveys of Marble Arch Cave and its feeders, the first complete descent of Noon's Hole and many other pots. From 1950, in association with the Craven Pothole Club, they considerably extended the Marble Arch system and opened up new ground in Counties Sligo and Cavan.

From 1935 to 1937 the club was active in the Burren, County Clare and recorded the first descent of Pollelva (1935) and discovery of part of Upper Pollnagollum (both later linked to become the longest cave in Ireland), as well as exploring some of the pots on the west side of Slieve Elva (Faunarooska, etc.), Coolagh River Cave and Ballycasheen, near Corofin.

In 1968 and 1969 a YRC caving team in conjunction with the Speleo Club du Liban discovered and explored the Magharet El-Khassarat cave system at Antelias, north of Beirut.

More recent international caving expeditions have been conducted in Guangxi, China (2000), Fengshan, China (2004–05) and Iran (2008).

== Mountaineering ==
The club has a long history of mountaineering in the UK, the Alps and the greater ranges. The YRC’s second Club President, William Cecil Slingsby, is regarded as the ‘father’ of Norwegian mountaineering. The YRC was a founding member of the British Mountaineering Council, the national representative body for climbers, hill walkers and mountaineers.

=== 1957 Jugal Himal expedition, Nepal ===
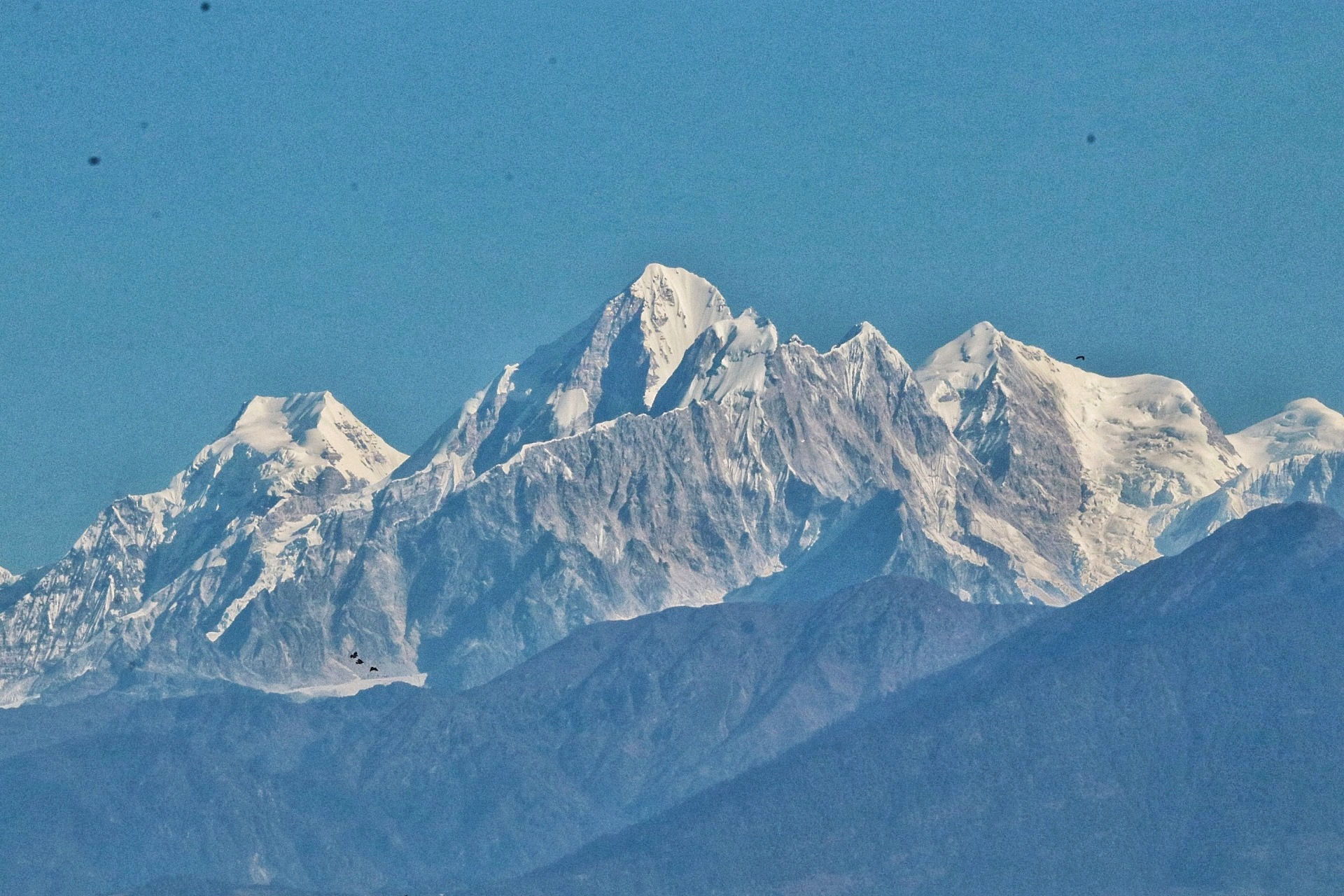
Dorje Lakpa (centre, 1995 YRC expedition) and Loenpo Gang (right, 1957 YRC expedition).

The 1957 YRC expedition to the Jugal Himal in Nepal was the first British Himalayan expedition to be sponsored by a single club and drawn from its own members. Six YRC members and six climbing Sherpas – Crosby Fox, leader, George Spenceley, deputy leader, Wilfred Anderson, Dan Jones, Arthur Tallon, Maurice Wilson, Mingma Tensing, Lakpa Norbu, Lakpa Tsering, Pemba Gyalen, Ang Temba, and Pemba Tensing – attempted the first ascent of Loenpo Gang (6,979m) in the Jugal Himal range. While returning to Camp IV (5,800m) from a reconnaissance, Fox, Spenceley, Mingma Tensing and Lakpa Norbu were avalanched. Only Spenceley survived, withdrawing the remainder of the team from the mountain.

More recent international trips have included:

=== Himalayas ===
Kanchenjunga base camps, Nepal 2015; Lhakhang, Spiti, India, 2008; Dorje Lhakpa, Nepal 1995.

=== Africa ===
Morocco 2024; Malawi 2013.

=== Americas ===
==== Bolivian Andes ====
Cordillera Real 2024; Quimsa Cruz 2010; Cocapata, Real and Occidental 1999; Apolobamba 1988.

==== USA ====
Climbing and trekking in the Wind River range, 2017; Yosemite, 2010; High Sierra, 2004.

=== Arctic ===
Svalbard 2006, 2008, 2010.

Liverpool Land Peninsula expedition, Greenland, 2014.

=== Europe ===
Bulgaria, 2015; France, 2011, 2016, 2017, 2022; Italy, 2006, 2019; Switzerland, 2012; Norway, 2017, 2019, 2022; Stubai Glacier Tour, Austria, 2009; Iceland, 1998.

== Club Premises and Huts ==
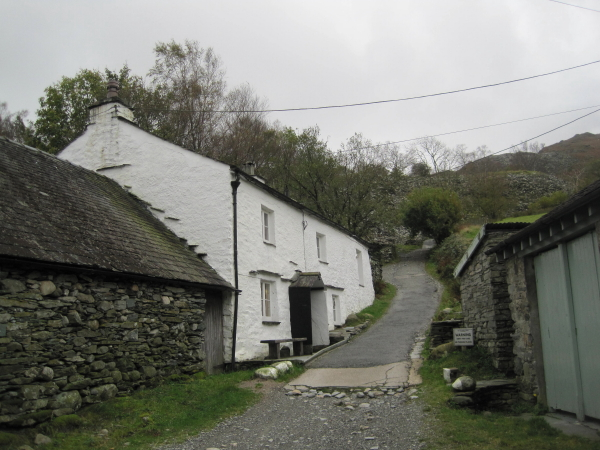
YRC hut at Low Hall Garth, Little Langdale.

Between 1892 and 1896, club meetings were held in the Victoria Hotel behind Leeds Town Hall. Between 1896 and 1924 the Club lodged at the Thoresby Society’s premises on Park Street, Leeds, before taking on a more peripatetic existence for the middle part of the 20th Century: in 1924 the Club moved to 10 Park Square, Leeds where its library was also housed, until 1941. In 1941 the Club moved to a room in the Salem Institute in Hunslet, and then to York Place, Leeds. Today, the Club’s hut at Lowstern serves as its headquarters.

The YRC has two huts: Lowstern near Clapham in North Yorkshire, and Low Hall Garth in Little Langdale in Cumbria. Low Hall Garth is a Grade II listed property, leased to the club since 1950 by the National Trust, to whom the property was gifted by Beatrix Potter.

== Notable Members ==
Notable past and present members have included:

- Bentley Beetham.
- Alan Hinkes.
- Clive Rowland, member of, inter alia, the 1977 expedition that made the first ascent of Baintha Brakk (The Ogre).
- William Cecil Slingsby.
- Frank Smythe, mountain photographer.
- George Spenceley, after whom the Spenceley Glacier is named.

== In Other Media ==
Lawrence Geoghegan's 1932 novel The Subterranean Club features a fictionalised account of the YRC, informed by the author's visit to Rowten Pot and Yordas Cave with members of the Club.

In April 2025, Leeds Central Library held an exhibition of climbing and mountaineering archive material that included YRC memorabilia, including the Wasdale climbing book produced by the Club's first President, George T Lowe.

== See also ==
Other UK Mountaineering 'Senior Clubs':

- The Alpine Club
- Climbers' Club
- Fell and Rock Climbing Club
- The Rucksack Club
- Scottish Mountaineering Club
- The Wayfarers' Club
