= Topo (climbing) =

Graphical representation of a climbing route

Examples of topos

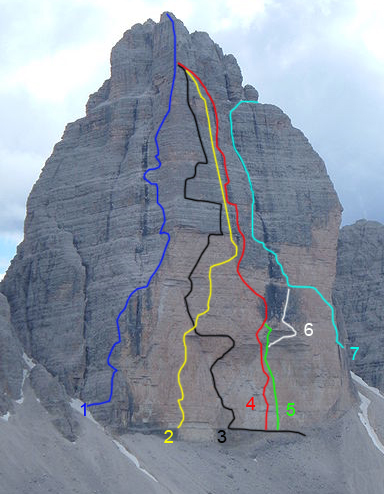
Basic topo of the big wall climbing routes on the north face of the Cima Ovest of the Tre Cime di Lavaredo

Graphical topo for multi-pitch sport route L'explosion des Calcanéums, 230m, 6-pitches, 6a+ (5.10b)

In climbing, a topo (short for topology) is a graphical representation of a climbing route. Topos range from a photograph of the climb on which the line of the route is overlaid, to a detailed diagram of the key features and challenges of the climb, which are typically represented as standardized UIAA topo symbols.

Climbing guidebooks compile topos for routes at a crag or in a climbing area. Online climbing databases and apps merge detailed beta (i.e. how to overcome the hardest challenges) as well as the traditional topo information. Some hand-drawn topos by the climber(s) who completed the first ascent of important new routes are notable.

== Description ==
The term "topo" means "topographical" information, which has historically meant showing the climber not just the basic line of the route, but also the key rock (or topological) features that defined the route. This would help to guide the climbers along the route and also to prepare them for the specific types of technical challenges that lay ahead. Such topological features include cracks, overhangs and roofs, slabs, and dihedrals.

Modern topos for single-pitch climbing routes, tend to be limited to photographs on which the line of the route is overlaid, and are often presented in groups where multiple routes are shown for a given section on a single photograph for a section of the rock face. Such topos assume that the climber can inspect the route from below and will be aware of the main obstacles that lay ahead.

Long climbing routes, such as those found in multi-pitch climbing, big wall climbing, and alpine climbing, have far more detailed topos (often in complex route diagrams), so that the climbers don't veer off the route (a major issue for long routes, and a serious one on exposed rock and alpine faces), and so that they are aware of important belaying, abseiling, and portaledge/bivouac points. The topos of longer routes also provide detailed information on the variations in the technical grade of each pitch of the route, the availability of climbing protection (e.g. pitons and bolts), as well as options and variations on the route (e.g. easier variations around difficult obstacles).

== Symbols ==
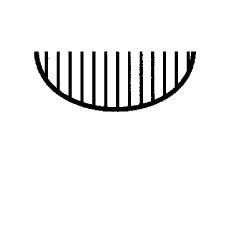
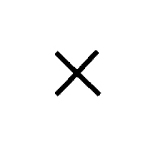
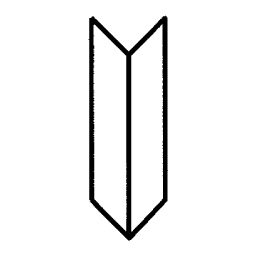
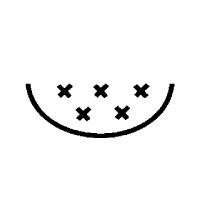
UIAA topo symbols for (clockwise from top left): an overhang, a bolt, a cornice, and a dihedral.

Topos often use standardized symbols or icons to represent the features and obstacles along the route. A notable example are the UIAA recommended symbols that were proposed for use in guidebooks, particularly for long alpine and big wall climbing routes. The UIAA list includes over 30 standardized symbols that cover a range of important information for any climbing route, and they are still in use today (see images opposite).

Other climbing guidebook publishers (e.g. such as 'RockFax'), have also developed their own customized symbols and icons that they use to augment their topo diagrams and photographs.

== Online ==
The development of interactive online apps and detailed databases of climbing routes has dramatically increased the detail of topos (e.g. providing detailed YouTube videos on how to climb a route including key movements and sections). Topo diagrams are increasingly interactive, and sometimes three dimensional, where the climber can scroll through a climb to examine every feature in rich detail. With such data, the line between traditional topo information and detailed beta information is increasingly blurred.

== First ascent ==
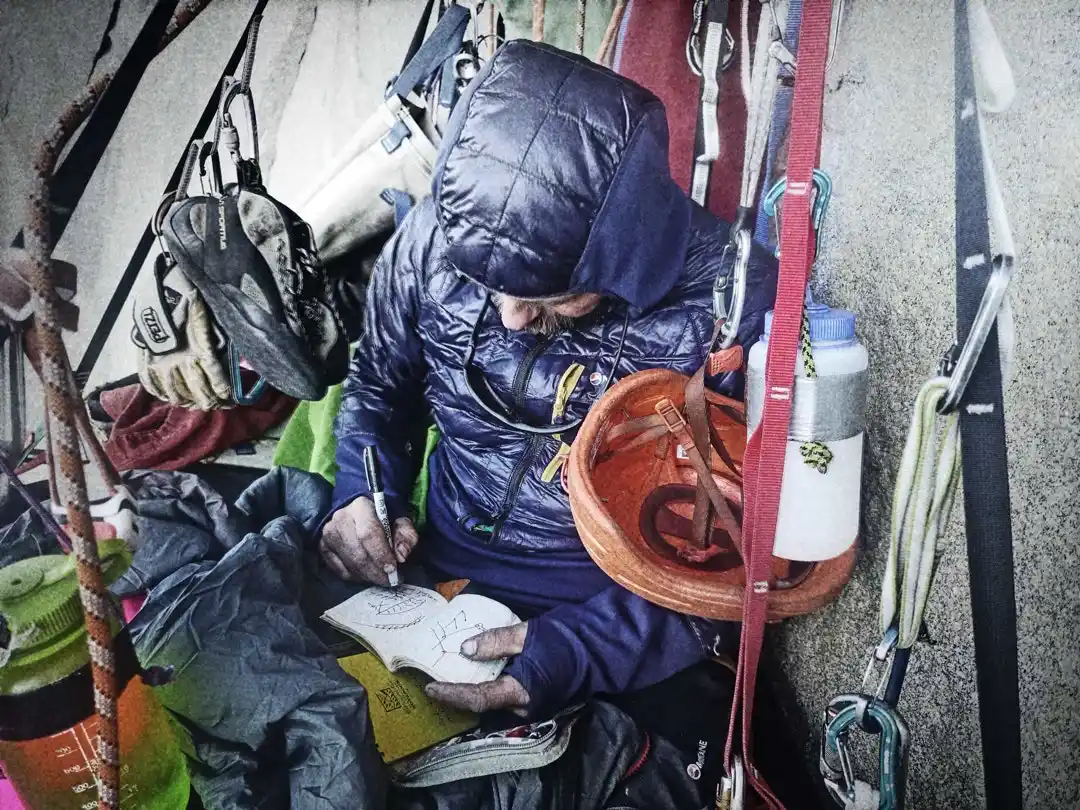
Andy Kirkpatrick updating the topo while on the aid climbing route Tribal Rite (5.8, A3+), El Capitan.

The climber(s) who make the first ascent and/or first free ascent of multi-pitch routes will typically hand-draw the first topo of the new climb to clarify the route they have completed, and their assessment of the main obstacles and their technical grade. Subsequent climbers will update/amend these topos as they ascend the route. Some hand-drawn topos have become iconic in climbing, and the hand-drawn topos of notable big wall climbs, such as many famous routes on El Capitan, are preserved in the climbing media.

== See also ==
- Beta (climbing)
- Glossary of climbing terms
- List of grade milestones in rock climbing
