= Fell & Rock Climbing Club =

British sports club

The Fell & Rock Climbing Club (or the Fell and Rock Club or FRCC) is the senior climbing club covering the English Lake District. It was founded in 1906–1907 and, amongst its other activities, publishes rock climbing guides to the area. It owns many of the early climbing photographs (e.g. Hankinson, 1975) taken by George & Ashley Abraham, who were founding members.

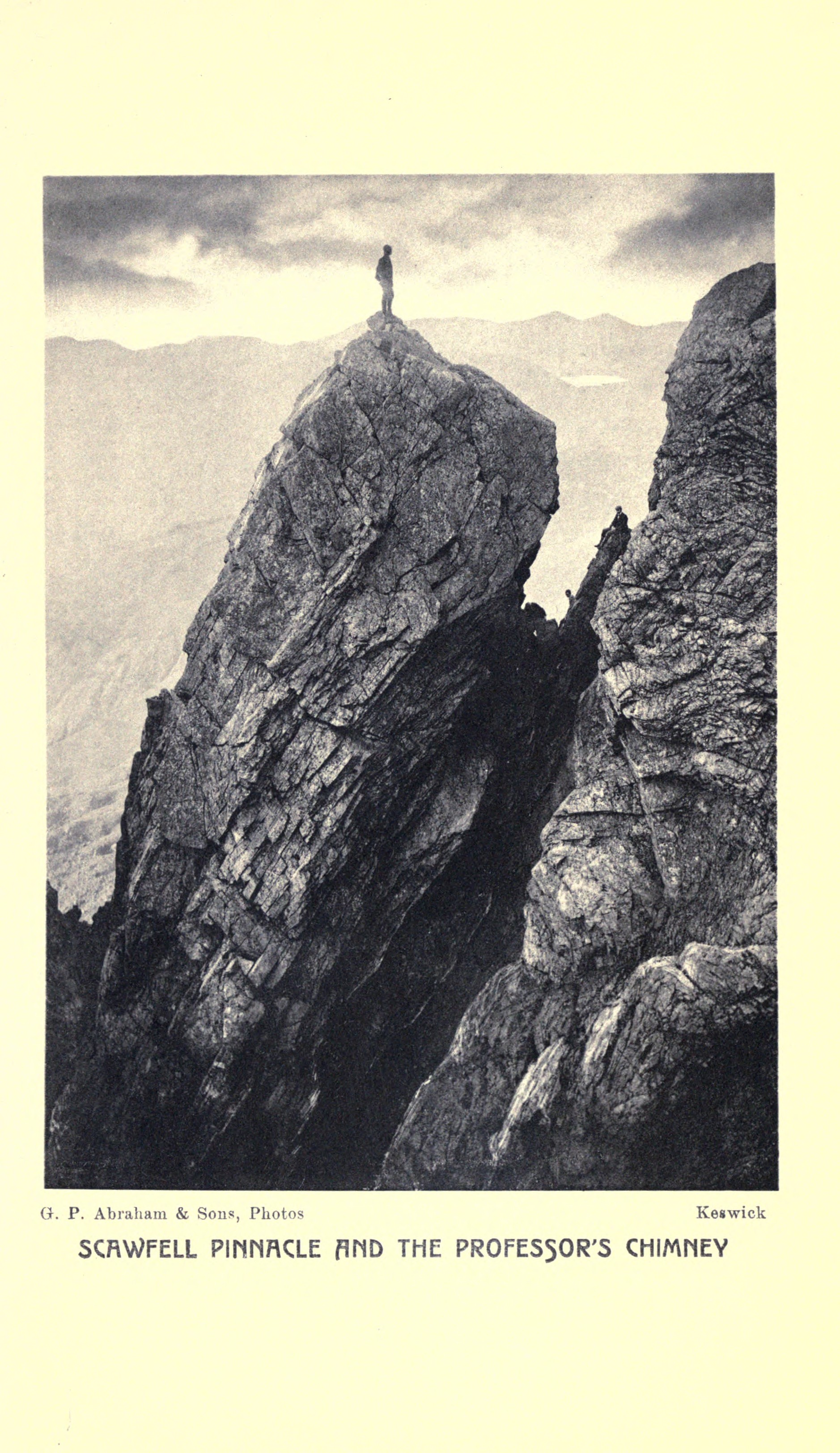
Photograph from Owen Glynne Jones's book, Rock-climbing in the English Lake District

== Early history ==
The club had been originally proposed by John Wilson Robinson about 1887, approximately when rock climbing began as a sport in England. Robinson, owner of a farm and, later, an estate agent's business in Keswick, climbed with Walter Parry Haskett Smith, generally acknowledged as the father of rock climbing in Great Britain, and it was Robinson – in 1885 - who introduced the use of the alpine rope in the Lake District.

Ashley Abraham was elected the first president of the FRCC, with Robinson one of its two vice-presidents. The chief objective of the club was:

"To encourage and foster under the safest and most helpful of conditions the exhilarating exercise and sport of Fell Rambling and Rock Climbing in the Lake District."

Safety was an issue at the time since several fatal accidents had occurred recently. Alluding to these, Abraham commented at the first annual dinner:

"Lack of discretion is a great evil in rock climbing, but there is another evil equally as great, and that is competitive climbing. This has been the fundamental cause of most of our home accidents . . ."

== Memorial ==
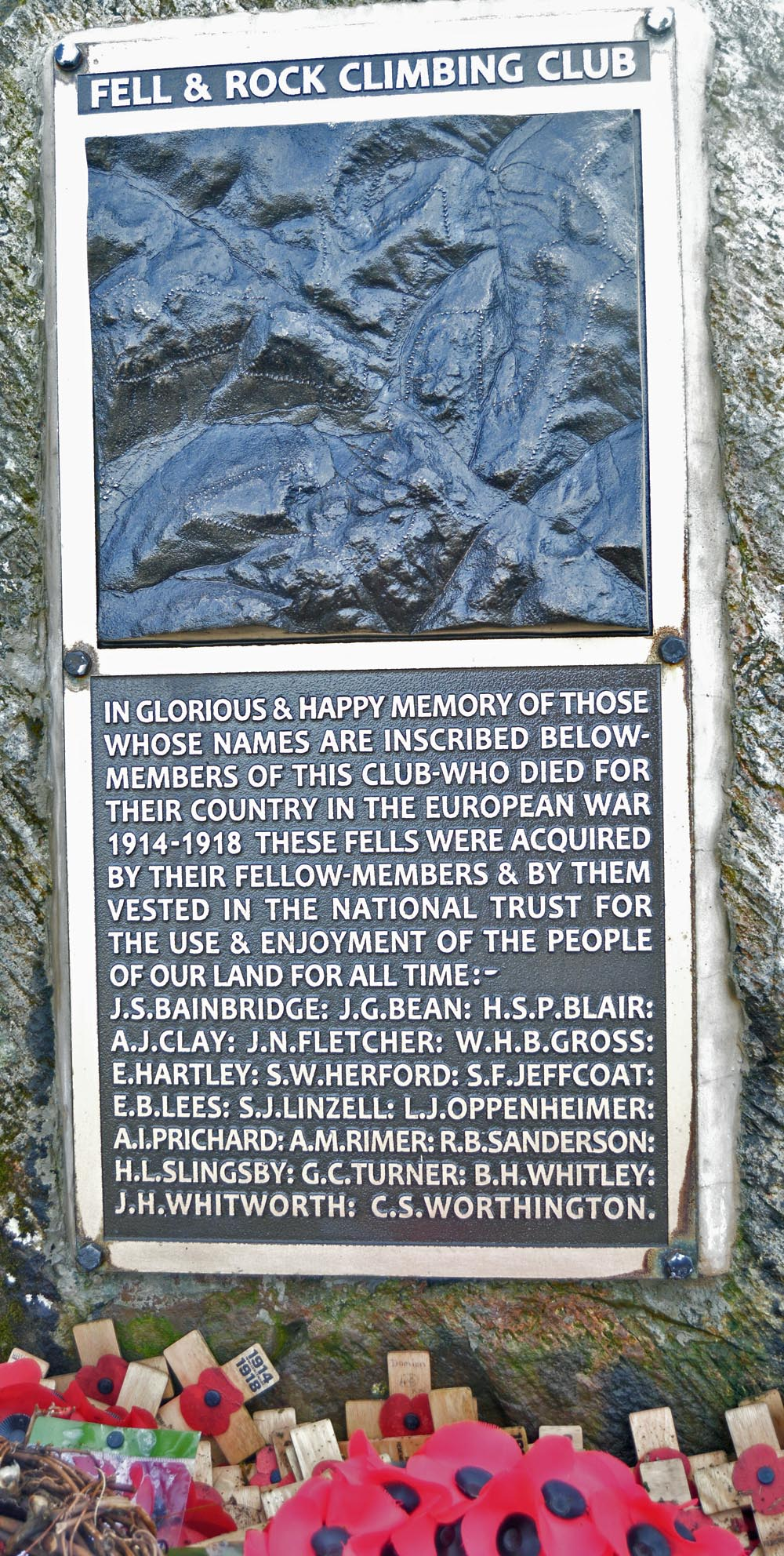
The replacement war memorial on Great Gable

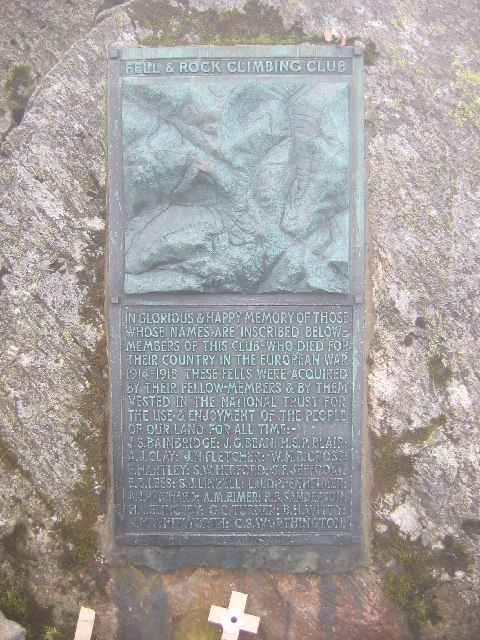
The original memorial plaque on Great Gable in memory of members of the club who died in 1914 - 18

A plaque commemorating members of the Fell & Rock Climbing Club who died in World War I is set on the summit rock of Great Gable; an annual memorial service is held there on Remembrance Sunday. The club bought 3,000 acres of land including Great Gable and donated it to the National Trust in memory of these members, and the plaque was dedicated on Whit Sunday 1924 by Geoffrey Winthrop Young in front of 500 people. The bronze memorial, weighing 70 kg, was removed in July 2013 and a replacement, with spelling errors corrected, was installed by Royal Engineers in October 2013.

== Publications ==
The FRCC produce a selection of rock climbing guides to the Lake District which are periodically updated. Below is a list of their current publications:

- Dow and Coppermines (2023)
- Duddon and Wrynose (2021)
- Lake District Sport and Slate (Joint publication with Wired Guides - 2020)
- Lake District Rock (Joint publication with Wired Guides - 2015)
- Buttermere & St Bees (2008)
- Gable & Pillar (2007)
- Langdale (2013)
- Borrowdale (2016)
- Scafell & Wasdale - CB Centenary Edition (2014)
- Lake District Winter Climbs (Cicerone Press - 2012)
- The Lakeland Fells (1996) (Out of Print)
- Eden Valley & South Lakes Limestone (2012)
- Eastern Crags (2011)
- Lake District New Climbs & Notes (2018)

== See also ==
Other UK Mountaineering 'Senior Clubs':

- The Alpine Club
- Climbers' Club
- The Rucksack Club
- Scottish Mountaineering Club
- The Wayfarers' Club
- Yorkshire Ramblers' Club
