= The Wayfarers' Club =

British mountaineering club

The Wayfarers' Club is a senior mountaineering club founded in Liverpool, England, in 1906.

In the century of the existence of the club, Wayfarers have left footprints in every continent and countless countries. In recent years, members' activities have ranged from homely rambles up Langdale to the ascent of Everest.

The club's handbook stated that the club's charter was to "encourage the pursuits of mountaineering, walking, ski-running and cave exploration, to bring together men who are interested in these pursuits and to do whatever shall be deemed by the Committee from time to time to be conducive to the attainment of the foregoing objects". To pursue the club's objects, the Wayfarers have regular organised meets around the UK, often in their own hut or those of their "Kindred Clubs". Informal climbing parties are also frequently in action at home and abroad.

The Wayfarers' Club was a founding member of the British Mountaineering Council, the national representative body of climbers, hill walkers and mountaineers.

Until the AGM of 2018 the club maintained the men-only membership rule with which almost all the senior clubs were founded. It was a subject that was debated and voted on numerous times over the years not quite reaching the 75% voting majority required by the club constitution. At the AGM on 24 November 2018 the amendment of "All references in these Rules to the masculine gender shall be interpreted as including the feminine gender" was approved with 84% being in favour of the change. In practice, however, life at the hut had been almost always mixed. Since 1981 members' wives, lady friends and female members of kindred clubs have been cordially welcomed on every day of the year, even the traditional men only weekends had been mixed for some years.

== The Robertson Lamb Hut ==
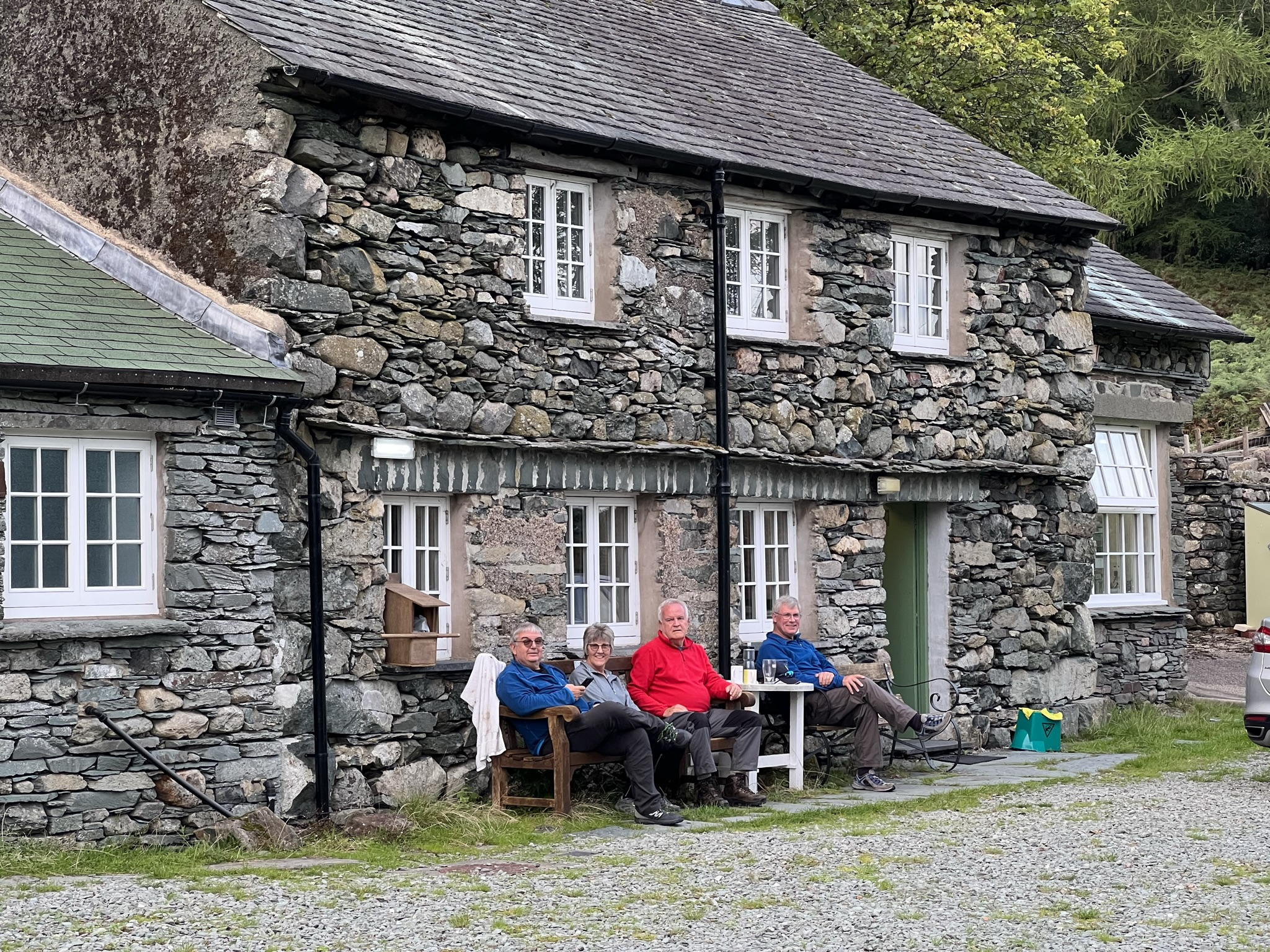
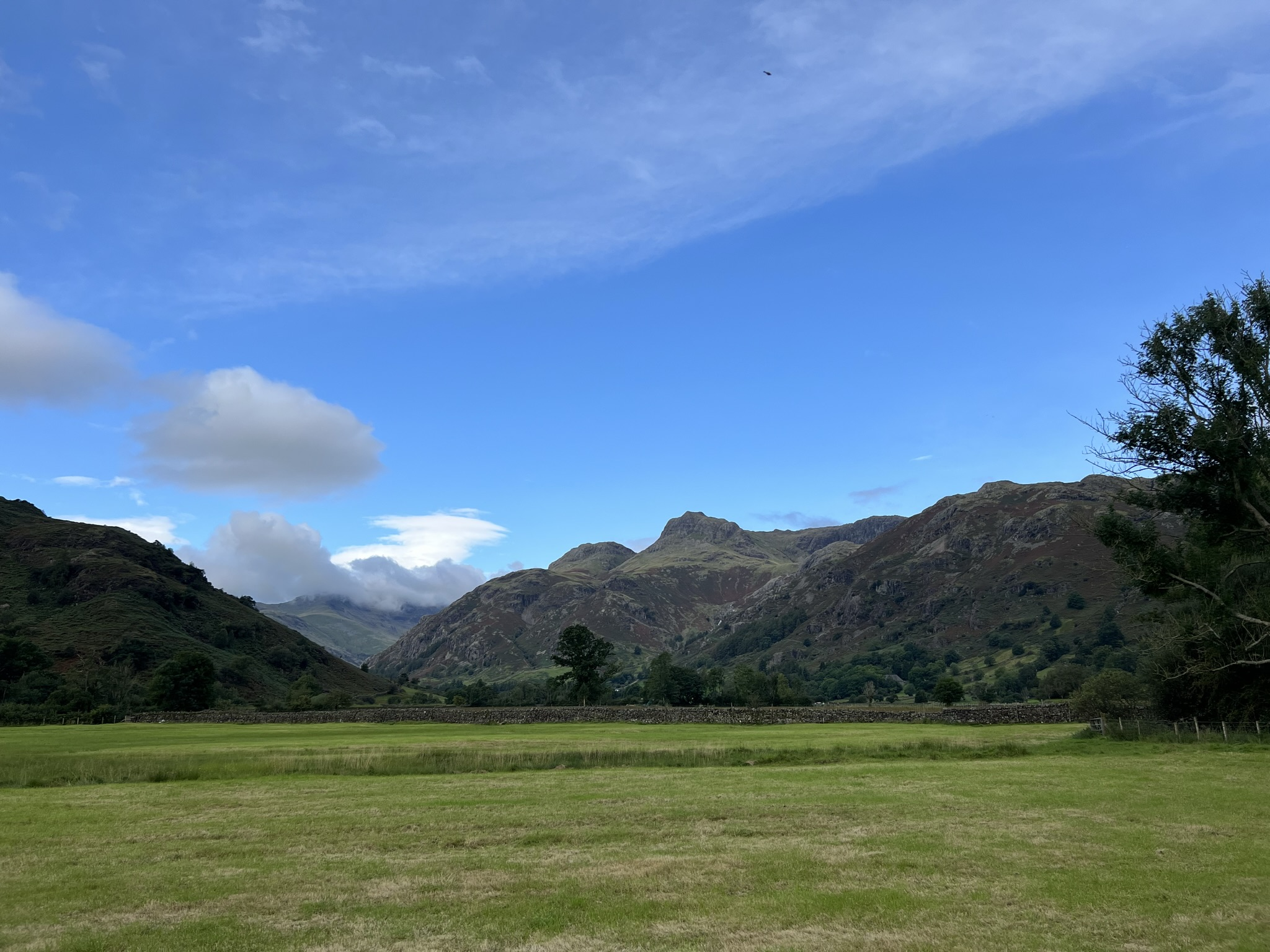

The Wayfarers' Club hut is in Langdale. Officially opened on 16 March 1930, the hut was the first dedicated climbing hut in the Lake District. It has been converted from an existing 18th century barn and is named in memory of Robertson Lamb, whose sister largely financed the conversion. There have been many alterations since 1930, but the character of the hut and its surroundings is an absolute in any such decisions.

== Kindred clubs ==
The Wayfarers' Club have reciprocal rights and 'Kindred Clubs' relationship with some of Britain's oldest climbing clubs.

- Fell and Rock Climbing Club
- The Rucksack Club
- Yorkshire Ramblers' Club
- Climbers' Club
- The Midlands Association of Mountaineers
- Merseyside Mountaineering Club
- Scottish Mountaineering Club
