= The Rucksack Club =

Climbing club from Manchester, England

The Rucksack Club was founded in Manchester in 1902 and has a current membership of well over 500 men and women. According to the Rules, "The purpose of the Club is to encourage mountaineering, climbing and hill walking and bring together all those who are interested in these pursuits."

== History ==
The Rucksack Club was formed in Manchester in 1902 by a group of men who responded to a letter written to a newspaper by two young men. They were invited to a meeting and resolved there and then to form a club with the object "To facilitate walking tours and mountaineering expeditions, both in the British Isles and elsewhere, and to particularly to initiate members into the science of rock climbing and snowcraft".

The Club has long been active in Mountain Rescue, Eustace Thomas designing the Thomas Stretcher which was in use by Mountain Rescue teams for many years. Members Fred Pigott and Noel Kirkman received OBEs for services to mountain rescue.

== Huts ==
The Club owns three huts: Beudy Mawr at the heart of the Llanberis Pass, High Moss in the Duddon Valley at the foot of the Walna Scar track over to Coniston, and Craigallan looking out over Loch Linnhe within easy reach of Glencoe.

== Notable members ==
- Eustace Thomas
- Ernest A. Baker
- Chris Brasher
- Dennis Davis
- J. Rooke Corbett
- John Sumner

== Notable "firsts" by members ==
- First Briton to climb all alpine 4000m peaks: Eustace Thomas
- First ascent of Nuptse 1961: Dennis Davis

== Bibliography ==
- Benson, Peter; Cudahy, Mike; Grant, Ian (1987). From Kinder Scout to Kathmandu : a Rucksack Club Anthology 1907–1986. Manchester: Rucksack Club. ASIN B000KFS9Z8 (UK).
- Beatty, John, ed. (2002). This Mountain Life: The First Hundred Years of the Rucksack Club. Manchester: Northern Light. ISBN 0-9546211-0-7.
- The Songs of the Mountaineers. Legare Street Press. 1923. ISBN 978-1019889985.

== See also ==
Other UK Mountaineering 'Senior Clubs':

- The Alpine Club
- Climbers' Club
- Fell and Rock Climbing Club
- Scottish Mountaineering Club
- The Wayfarers' Club
- Yorkshire Ramblers' Club
