= Dulalthok =

Dulalthok दुलालथोक Bhamarkot
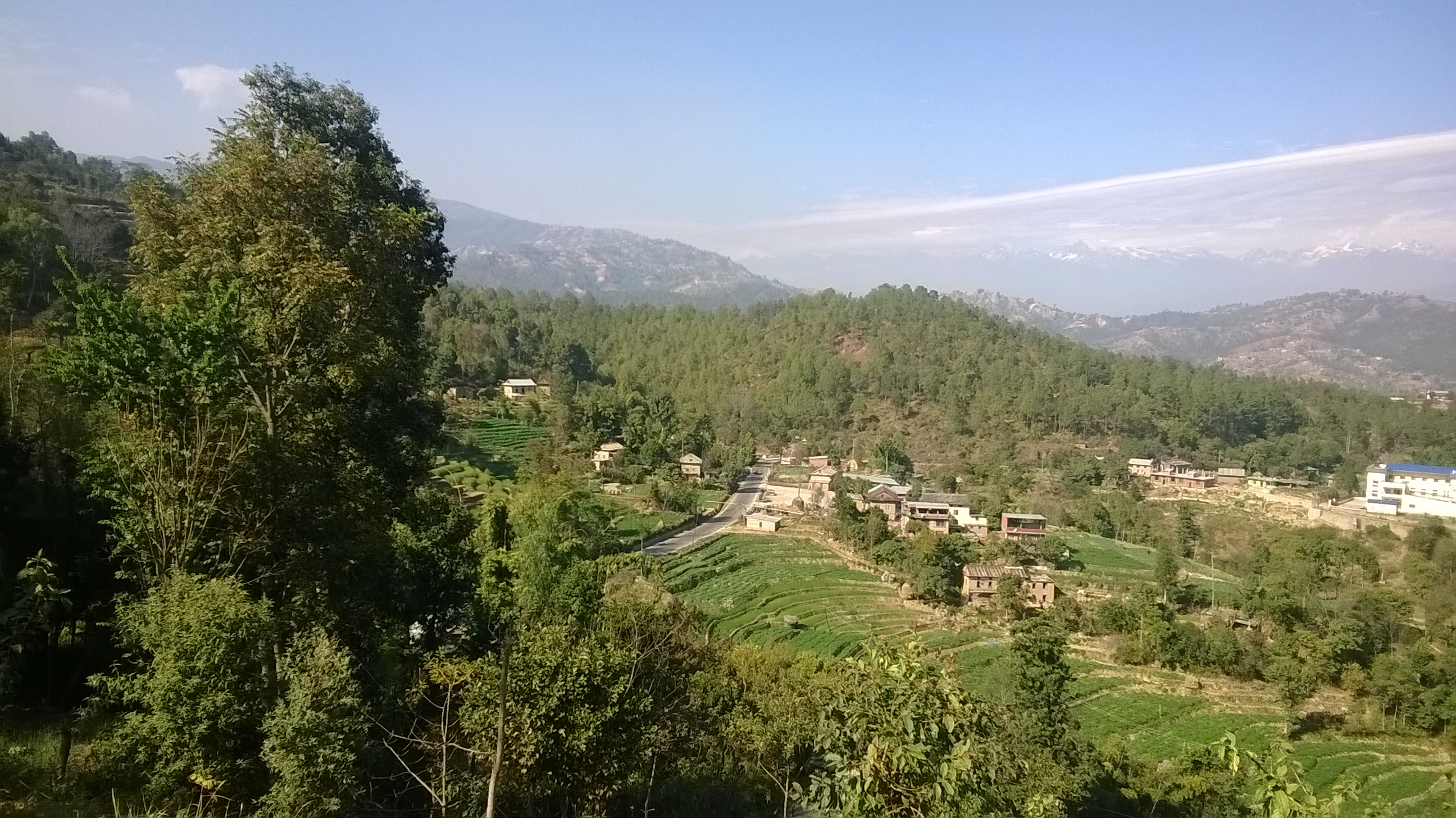

- location on map
- Coordinates: 27°38′7″N 85°36′13″E
- Country: Nepal
- Zone: Bagmati
- District: Kabhrepalanchok
- Municipality: Panchkhal
- Elevation: 1,100 m (3,600 ft)
- Time zone: UTC+5:45 (Nepal Standard Time)
- Postal Code: 45212
- Area code: 011

Dulalthok is a village located in Panchkhal Municipality of Kavrepalanchok, Nepal. It lies about 6 km east of Dhulikhel; its district headquarter. Its altitude extends from 870 m to 1100 m above the sea level.

== Name ==
The name comes from combination of Dulal, surname of a Hindu Brahmin community, meaning wanderer and thok meaning abode.

== Health and Education ==
Dulalthok was declared open defecation free zone in 2008 .
