= Dorje Lhakpa =

Mountain in Langtang National Park, Nepal

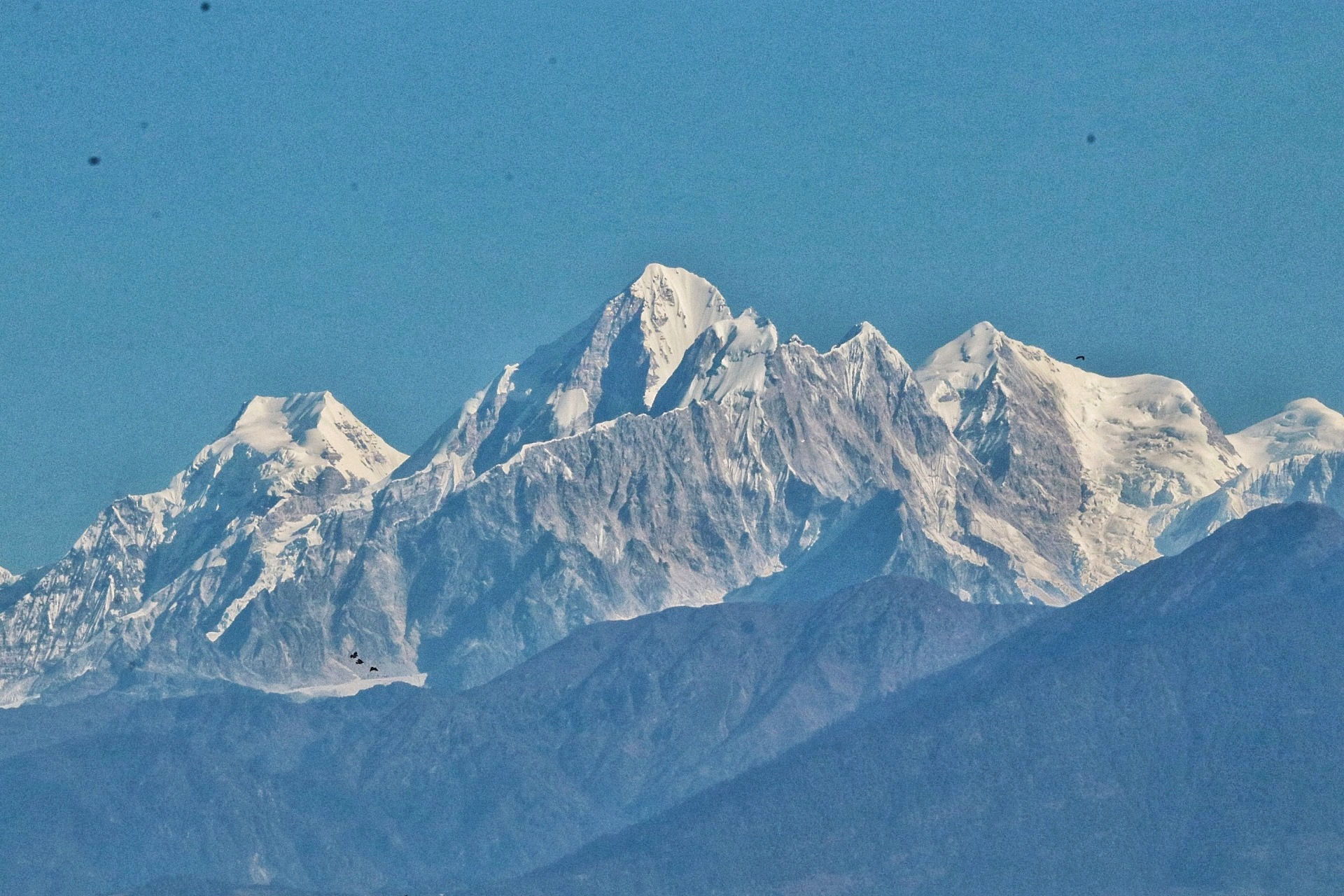
- Dorje Lhakpa seen from Dulalthok. Loenpo Gang is visible further right.

Highest point
- Elevation: 6,966 m (22,854 ft)
- Prominence: 756 m (2,480 ft)
- Listing: Mountains of Nepal
- Coordinates: 28°10′26″N 85°46′52″E

Geography
- Location within Nepal
- Country: Nepal
- Province: Bagmati
- Protected area: Langtang National Park
- Parent range: Jugal Himal

Climbing
- First ascent: 16 October 1981
- Easiest route: West Ridge

Dorje Lhakpa is a mountain in the Jugal Himal, southeast of Langtang valley in Nepal.

Visible also from Kathmandu valley it has an elegant pyramid-shaped figure and is an ideal target for photographers and mountaineers. Considered by many of intermediate difficulty with easiest route from the west ridge. Its climb is offered by many trekking and mountaineering agencies in Nepal.

== Climbing history ==
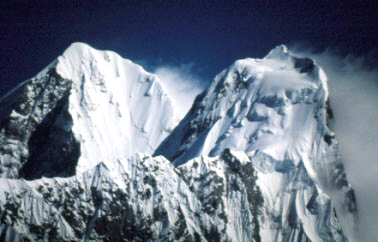
Mounting clouds on Dorje Lhakpa

In 1986, a German–Nepalese expedition reached the mountain from the southern Balephi Khola and attempt to climb it over the west ridge. On 11 July 1986, Helmut Müller, Bernd Mayer reached the summit separately; Müller is forced to bivouac at 6,700 m (22,000 ft) while descending.

In 1992 Carlos Buhler made a solo climb of Dorje Lhakpa via the West Ridge. Buhler did not initially intend to climb solo but his climbing partner Jon Aylward became ill at base camp.

A team from the Yorkshire Ramblers' Club attempted the first British ascent by the west ridge in 1995; deteriorating conditions forced the team to turn back at 6,100m.
