= Climbers' Club =

Rock climbing club in England and Wales (est. 1898)

The Climbers' Club
- The Climbers' Club
- Abbreviation: CC
- Formation: 28 April 1898; 128 years ago
- Founded at: London, England, United Kingdom
- Purpose: Encourage mountaineering and rock-climbing and to promote the general interests of mountaineers and the mountain environment.
- Members: 1700+
- Affiliations: BMC
- Website: Climbers' Club

The Climbers' Club (CC) is the senior rock climbing club in England and Wales (outside the Lake District). The club was founded in 1898 and is one of the largest publishers of climbing guidebooks in many of the main climbing areas of England and Wales. The club also owns and operates a number of climbing huts in England, Scotland, and Wales.

== Early history ==
The Club developed from England's and Wales' earliest attempt to formally organize and bring together those who were active in participating and developing the "new" sport of rock climbing.

In 1870, C. E. Mathews founded the Society of Welsh Rabbits, which was a loose association of climbers who were largely English. By 1897, members of the Society saw a need for something more formal, and forty met at the Café Monico in London to discuss forming a new Club.

Originally perceived as merely a dining club, meeting once a year in London, one-third of the original members were also affiliated with the venerable Alpine Club - generally more conservative and populated largely by alpinists who had little regard for climbing in Great Britain, except as training for the Alps. The first president, C. E. Mathews, was, himself, a pillar of the AC, but supported this new adventurous but parochial initiative. Not without the wry criticism so fashionable at the time, however, as the arch-conservative mountaineer Douglas Freshfield punned:

Why is it to the Alpine Club
Our C. E. M. no longer keeps?
Why should he found - himself as hub –
A Climbers' Club for chimney sweeps.

== Huts ==
The Climbers' Club operates a number of climbing huts.

=== Wales ===
- Ynys Ettws (Llanberis, North Wales)
- Cwm Glas Mawr (Llanberis, North Wales)
- Helyg (Ogwen, North Wales)
- May Cottage (Pembroke, South Wales)

=== England ===
- RO Downes (Froggatt, Peak District)
- Count House (Bosigran, Cornwall)
- Grange Old School (Borrowdale, The Lake District)

=== Scotland ===
- Riasg (Roy Bridge, Central Highlands of Scotland)

== See also ==
Other UK Mountaineering 'Senior Clubs':

- Alpine Club
- Fell and Rock Climbing Club
- The Rucksack Club
- Scottish Mountaineering Club
- The Wayfarers' Club
- Yorkshire Ramblers' Club
