= British Mountaineering Council =

National body for climbers, hill walkers and mountaineers

The British Mountaineering Council
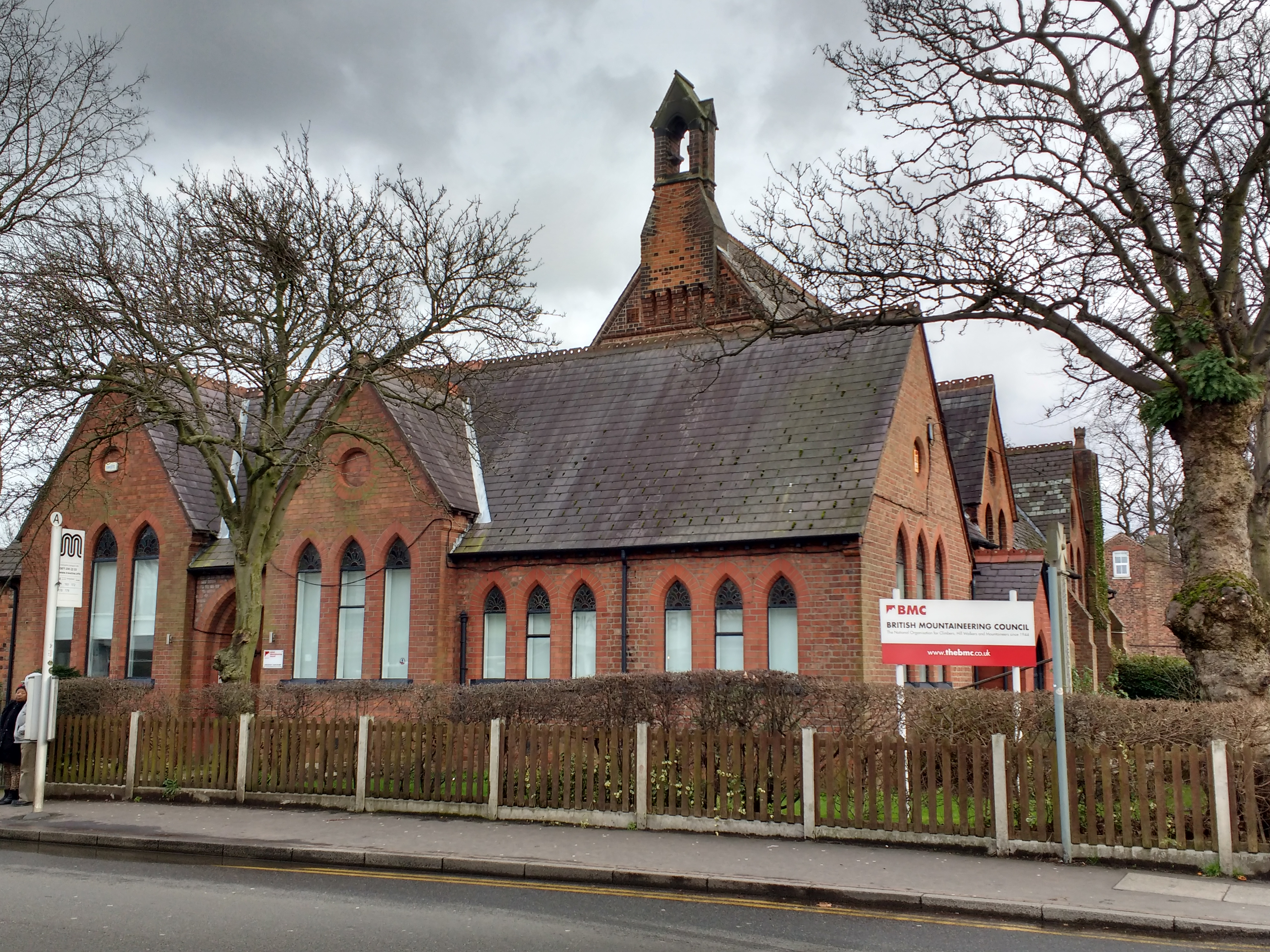
- BMC headquarters in Manchester
- Formation: 1944; 82 years ago
- Headquarters: Burton Road, West Didsbury
- CEO: Paul Davies
- President: Dominic Oughton
- Chair: Currently vacant
- Website: www.thebmc.co.uk

The British Mountaineering Council (BMC) is the national representative body for England and Wales that exists to protect the freedoms and promote the interests of climbers, hill walkers and mountaineers, including ski-mountaineers. The BMC are also recognised by government as the national governing body for competition climbing.

== History ==
The organisation was originally formed in 1944, following a proposal from the president of the Alpine Club, Geoffrey Winthrop Young. It aimed to represent the interests of climbing clubs and primarily maintain access for climbers to climb on a mountain, a crag, or even a sea cliff in England and Wales. When the council was created the following aims were set out:

- Protection of climbing areas from planned development.
- Provision of huts and hostels.
- Reviewing and investigating climbing equipment.
- Assisting mountain rescue.
- Provision of climbing and hillwalking instructors.
- Establishing regional committees.
- Publication of a mountaineering journal.

In 1972 as a result of the Cairngorm Plateau disaster where five school children and one teacher died of hypothermia the BMC began working closely with the Mountain Leader Training Board. To this day membership of the BMC or Mountaineering Scotland is required to begin mountain leader training.

In 1997, the BMC was one of the organisations which formed the Mountain Training Trust which took control of managing Plas y Brenin on behalf of Sport England.

As of 2017 its headquarters are on Burton Road in West Didsbury, an area of Manchester, England.

In 2018, members voted for the first female president of the organisation, Lynn Robinson.

=== Founding members ===
The BMC began with 25 member climbing and outdoor organisations including:

- Alpine Club
- The Rucksack Club
- The Wayfarers' Club
- Ladies' Alpine Club
- Pinnacle Club
- The Yorkshire Ramblers' Club

== Member benefits ==
The British Mountaineering Council works for its members to provide services and representation for: access and conservation, climbing walls, clubs and huts, competition climbing, equipment advice, guidebooks and maps, heritage, international, safety and skills, youth and equity. The organisation now has two types of membership; those that are affiliated via a club and those that are individual members.

The BMC currently has over 75,000 members: 51,000 individual members, 24,000 club members, and 280 affiliated clubs. Membership benefits include access to the BMC travel insurance scheme, civil liability insurance, discounts on equipment, technical and training advice, and four copies of Summit magazine each year.

Summit magazine aims to cover articles of interest to all climbers, hill walkers, and mountaineers. It frequently covers topics outside the remit of the mainstream magazines. Editions of the magazine are produced four times per year (Feb, May, Sep, Nov) and are sent direct to all British Mountaineering Council (BMC) individual members. People who are members of the BMC through an affiliated club only receive one copy – the February issue. The circulation therefore varies from 40,000 (May, Sep, Nov) to 75,000 (Feb). This makes it the climbing magazine with the largest circulation in the UK. It is also available to purchase in the BMC online shop and available from selected mountain centres throughout the UK, such as Plas y Brenin in Capel Curig.

The BMC produces rock climbing guidebooks to parts of the UK, primarily the Peak District and Lancashire. It also administers a 'reciprocal rights card' service, giving BMC affiliate members reduced rates in alpine huts owned by other national mountaineering organisations.

== Rebranding proposal ==
On 25 July 2016 the British Mountaineering Council announced its intention to re-brand itself as "Climb Britain", following consultant advice funded by Sport England. However, following a strong backlash from its membership and subsequent consultations and heated online debates, it announced two months later that the renaming would not go ahead. Because of the way the rebranding issue had been handled, the BMC executive committee subsequently found itself facing a motion of no confidence from some of its members at its April 2017 AGM.

Interest was expressed in using the "Climb Britain" brand for another purpose within the BMC.

== See also ==
- Mountaineering Scotland
- Lancashire Rock
