= Kun =

Kun or KUN may refer to:

- Kun (surname), Kún Khun etc

== People with the given name or nickname ==
- Cai Xukun (b. 1998), Chinese singer known simply as Kun
- Cao Kun (1862–1938), President of the Republic of China
- Chen Kun (b. 1976), Chinese actor and singer
- Chen Kun (baseball) (b. 1980), Chinese baseball player
- Chunyu Kun, Confucian philosopher and official
- Feng Kun (b. 1978), Chinese female volleyball player
- Hu Kun (b. 1963), Chinese violinist and conductor
- Huang Kun (1919–2005), Chinese physicist
- Jiang Kun (disambiguation), several people
- Kun Can, Chinese painter
- Kun Yang (b. 1967), Chinese physicist
- Lee Kwan or Li Kun, Chinese actor
- Li Kun (b. 1981), Chinese footballer
- Lu Kun (1772–1835), Chinese Qing Dynasty official
- Qian Kun, Chinese singer and songwriter
- Wang Kun (disambiguation), several people
- Yang Kun (b. 1972), Chinese singer-songwriter
- Zhao Kun (b. 1973), Chinese swimmer

== Other uses ==
- Kun (鯤) and Peng, two forms of a creature from Chinese mythology
- Kunqu or Kun Opera, a Chinese opera genre
- kun (君), a Japanese honorific
- Kun (Islamic term) (كن), meaning manifesting, existing or being
- KUN, Kaunas Airport, Lithuania, IATA code
- Kun Peak, in the Nun Kun mountain massif, Ladakh, India

== See also ==
- Khun (disambiguation)
- Gun (disambiguation)
