= Gunz =

Gunz may refer to:

== Games ==
- GunZ: The Duel, a 2005 South Korean online third-person shooting game
- GunZ 2, a 2011 South Korean fighting video game, sequel to GunZ: The Duel

== Places ==
- Günz, a river in Bavaria, Germany
  - Östliche Günz, or "eastern Günz," a river in Bavaria, Germany
  - Westliche Günz, or "western Günz," a river in Bavaria, Germany
- Günz Glacial Stage, name for an early Pleistocene stage used in the Alps

== Music ==
- Gunz n' Butta, a 2011 collaborative album by Cam'ron and Vado
- Lord Tariq and Peter Gunz, American rap duo
- Young Gunz, American rap duo

== People ==
- Cory Gunz (born 1987), American rapper from The Bronx, New York City, New York
- Gabriele Günz (born 1961), retired East German high jumper
- Walter Gunz (born 1946), German entrepreneur

== See also ==
- Gun (disambiguation)
