= Mount Kun =

Mountain in Ladakh, India

Kun Peak
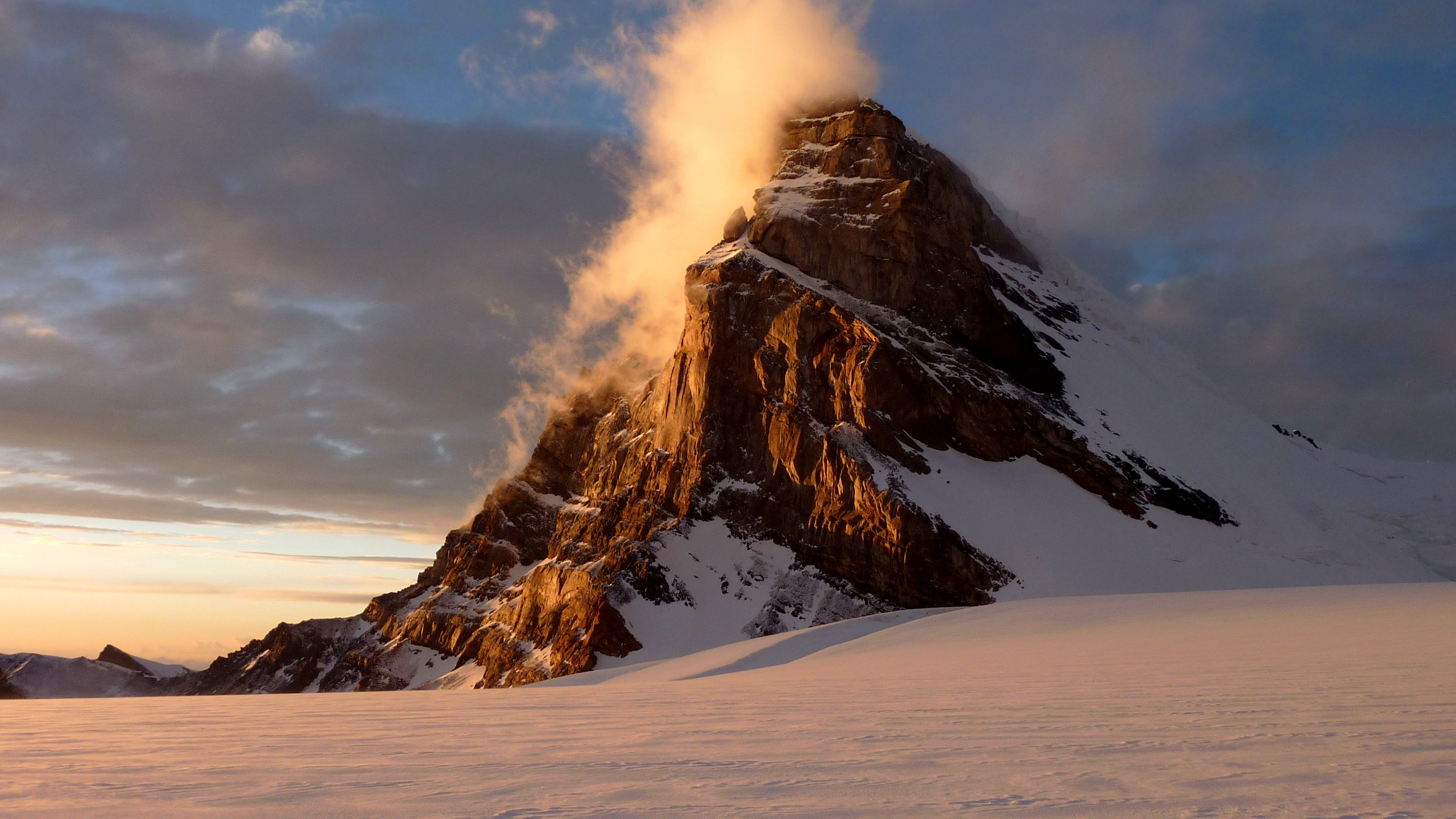
- Kun Peak

Highest point
- Elevation: 7,077 m (23,219 ft)
- Coordinates: 34°0′46.80″N 76°3′24.63″E

Geography
- Location within Ladakh
- Location: Suru Valley, Kargil, Ladakh, India
- Parent range: Himalaya

Climbing
- First ascent: 1913 by Mario Piacenza and Lorenzo Borelli, Italy
- Easiest route: Northeast Ridge: glacier/snow/ice climb

The Kun Peak is a part of Nun Kun mountain massif in Ladakh, India. It is the second highest summit of the massif with elevation of 23,219 ft (7,077 metres) in the western Himalayan Range, located near the Suru valley, on the road connecting Kargil and Zanskar. It is located about 61 km south of Kargil and 141 km west of Leh.

The Kun Peak is located north of Nun Peak 23,409 ft (7,135 metres) which is the highest summit of the massif and is separated from it by a snowy plateau of 4 km in length, in the northeast just at a distance of 2 km rises another peak of the massif known as Pinnacle Peak 22,740 ft (6,930 metres).

== Mountaineering ==
The Nun Kun massif was first sighted in 1898 and three visits by Arthur Neve, in 1902, 1904, and 1910. In 1903, Dutch mountaineer Dr. H. Sillem investigated the massif and discovered the high plateau between the peaks; he reached an altitude of 6,400 m (21,000 ft) on Nun. In 1906, the Pinnacle Peak was first ascended by a noted explorer couple Fanny Bullock Workman and her husband William Hunter Workman. They also toured extensively through the massif and produced a map; however, controversy surrounded the Workmans' claims, and few trigonometrical points were given for the region, so that the map they produced was not usable. The Kun Peak was first successfully climbed by an Italian mountaineering team led by Mario Piacenza, Lorenzo Borelli in August 1913.

The massif is accessed by a 210-kilometre (130 mi) road from Srinagar NH 1D up to Kargil and then 80 km (50 mi) via Kargil Zanskar road.
