= Gun (game) =

Gun in game topics may refer to:

- Gungame (disambiguation), gunning games
- Game gun (disambiguation), guns for games
- Gun (disambiguation), for gaming topics named "Gun"

== See also ==
- Gun (video game), a Western-themed action-adventure video game
- Space Gun (video game), a video game named "Space Gun"
- Gun fu, a fictional martial art that uses guns as its focal weapon, used in fictional games of guns
- Game (disambiguation)
