= Khilanmarg =

Small valley in Jammu and Kashmir, India

Coordinates: 34.048°N 74.385°E

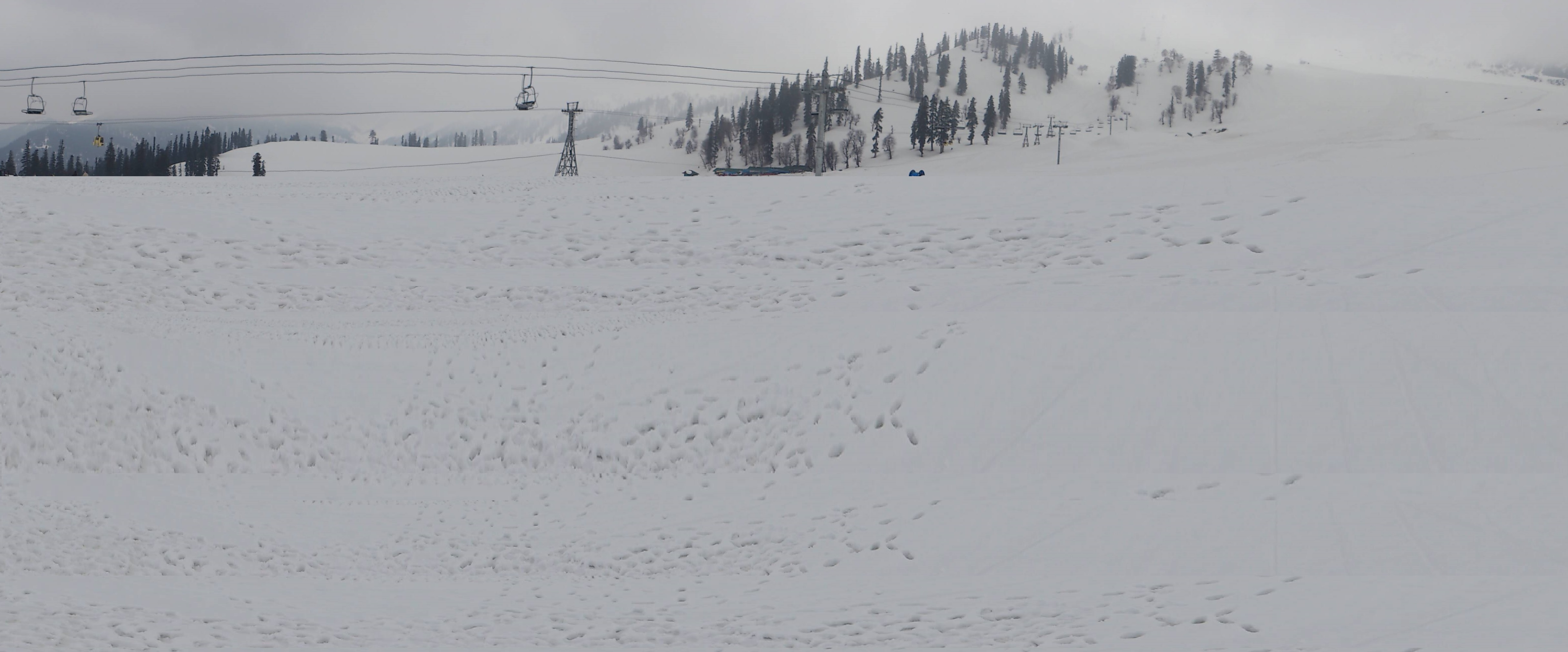
Snow in Khillanmarg

Khilanmarg is a small valley in Jammu and Kashmir, India, located about 6 kilometres (3.7 mi) away from the Gulmarg. The meadow, carpeted with flowers in the spring, is the site for Gulmarg's winter ski runs and offers a view of the surrounding peaks and over the Kashmir Valley. It's a 600 metres (2,000 ft) ascent from Gulmarg to Khilanmarg. The view spans from the Himalayas from Nanga Parbat to the twin 7,100 metres (23,300 ft) peaks of Nun and Kun to the southeast.
