= Pistol (disambiguation) =

A pistol is a small handheld firearm. It may also refer to:

== Arts and entertainment ==
- Ancient Pistol, a character in several of Shakespeare's plays
- Pistol (film), a 1973 Swedish film
- Pistol (miniseries), a miniseries about the band Sex Pistols
- The Pistol (EP)
- "Pistol", a song by Cigarettes After Sex
- A bid in some variants of the dominoes game 42

== People ==
- Ion Pistol (1946–1987), Romanian executed for murder
- "Pistol" Pez Whatley (1951–2005), American professional wrestler

== Other uses ==
- Pistol River, Oregon, United States
- Pistol Bay, Nunavut, Canada
- Pistol offense, an offensive strategy in American football
- Pistol squat, variant of lower body exercise used in strength training
- Pistol Star, a blue hypergiant star in the Milky Way galaxy, often abbreviated as "Pistol"
- Magnetic pistol, on a naval mine or torpedo, fuze for detonation by a nearby magnetic mass
- Aerial bomb fuze

== See also ==
- Pistil, part of a flower
- Pistole, a type of coin
- Pistol Pete (disambiguation), nickname and fictional character name
- Gun (disambiguation)
