= Annie Smith Peck =

American mountain climber (1850–1935)

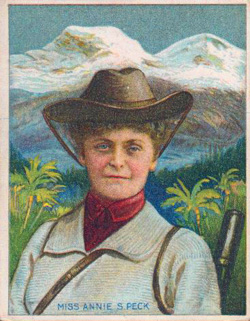
- Annie Smith Peck, from a trading card issued in 1911
- Born: October 19, 1850; Providence, Rhode Island
- Died: July 18, 1935 (aged 84); New York, New York
- Education: Rhode Island College; University of Michigan
- Occupations: Mountaineer, Educator, Writer
- Known for: Adventurer, Suffragist, Feminist

Annie Smith Peck (October 19, 1850 – July 18, 1935) was an American mountaineer and adventurer. The northern peak of the Peruvian Cordillera Blanca mountain chain, Huascarán was named Cumbre Aña Peck in Peck's honor. She was an ardent suffragist and noted speaker. She lectured extensively for many years throughout the world, and wrote four books encouraging travel and exploration.

== Early life and education ==
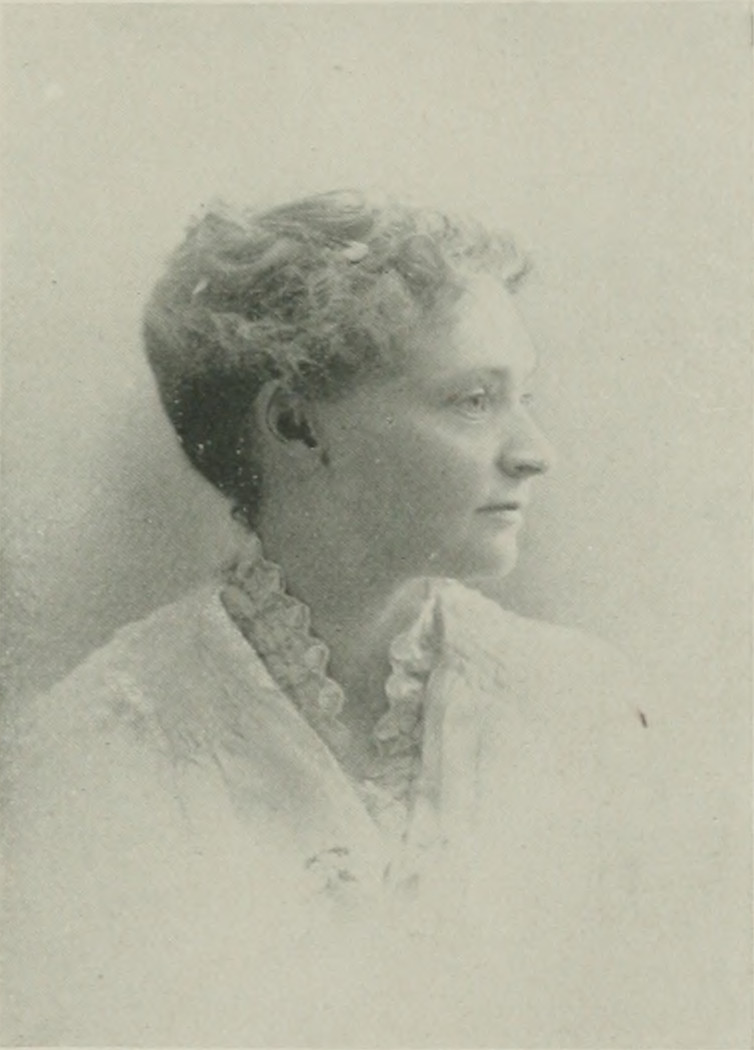
An 1893 photograph of Peck

Peck was born on October 19, 1850, in Providence, Rhode Island. She was the youngest of five children born to Ann Power (Smith) Peck (1820–1896) and George Bacheler Peck (1807–1882). Her brothers, George Bacheler Peck (1843–1934), a doctor; William Thane Peck (1848–1939), principal of Providence Classical High School; and John Brownell Peck (1845–1923), an engineer, merchant, teacher, and farmer; instilled a sense of competitiveness in Peck at a young age. Her sister, Emily Smith Peck (1847–1847), died in infancy.

Peck grew up in Providence, where she attended Dr. Stockbridge's School for Young Ladies and Providence High School. Peck graduated in 1872 from Rhode Island Normal School (present-day Rhode Island College), a preparatory school for teachers. Peck briefly taught Latin at Providence High School, but wanted to attend Brown University like her father and brothers had done; however, she was refused admission to the university on the basis of her gender.

Instead of attending Brown University, Peck moved to Saginaw, Michigan, intending to live on her own and support herself. Peck found work as a preceptress and teacher of languages and mathematics at Saginaw High School, where she remained until 1874. While teaching in Saginaw, Peck decided to further her education by earning an undergraduate degree from a university. When she wrote home to tell her family about her plans, they thought it was "perfect folly" for her to want to attend college and graduate at the age of twenty-seven. In a letter to her father, Peck argued, "Why you should recommend for me a course so different from that which you pursue, or recommend to your boys is what I can see no reason for except the example of our great grandfathers and times are changing rapidly in that respect. I certainly cannot change. I have wanted it for years and simply hesitated on account of age but 27 does not seem as old now as it did. I should hope for 20 years of good work afterwards." After learning that she insisted on earning the same education as her brothers, Peck's father agreed to support her education. In 1874 Peck enrolled at the University of Michigan, which opened its doors to women in 1871.

Peck earned an undergraduate degree with honors from the University of Michigan in 1878 with a major in Greek and classical languages and a master's degree in Greek from the university in 1881. She taught Latin and speech at Purdue University from 1881 to 1883. In 1884 Peck traveled to Europe, where she continued her education at Hannover, Germany, and at Athens, Greece. In 1885 Peck became the first woman to attend the American School of Classical Studies at Athens, where she studied archeology.

== Career ==
Although Peck initially worked as a teacher, she took up the sport of mountaineering while studying in the mid-1880s. Beginning in 1892 she made her living as a public lecturer, mountaineer, and author of travel guides. As Peck began to climb, lecture, and explore in Latin America, she also promoted Pan-Americanism (peace between the Americas) and geographic education through her lectures, and publications.

=== Educator and lecturer ===
Peck worked as schoolteacher in Providence, Rhode Island, as well as Saginaw, Michigan; Cincinnati, Ohio; and Montclair, New Jersey. From 1881 to 1883 Peck was a professor of Latin and speech at Purdue University, and after returning from a two-year stay in Europe, she briefly taught Latin at Smith College from 1886 to 1887. By 1892 she gave up teaching and made her living by lecturing and writing about archeology, mountaineering, and her travels.

=== Mountain climber ===
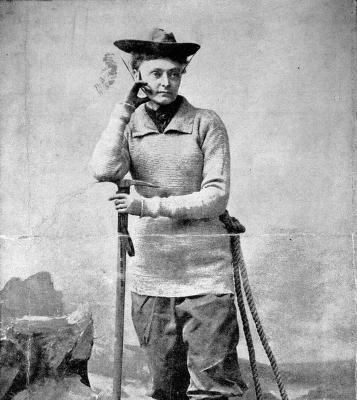
Annie Smith Peck wearing climbing clothing in 1911

In 1885, while pursuing her education in Europe, Peck discovered her enthusiasm for mountaineering. She ascended moderate-sized mountains in Europe and in the United States, including California's 14,380-foot (4,380 m) Mount Shasta in 1888, the 300-foot (91 m) summit of Cape Misenum in Italy and small mountain passes in Switzerland, including Theodul Pass at 10,000 feet (3,000 m). While in Greece, she climbed Mount Hymettus and Mount Pentecus, which ranged between 3,000 feet (910 m) and 4,000 feet (1,200 m).

In 1895 Peck followed in British mountaineer Lucy Walker's ascent of the Matterhorn, but Peck's accomplishment was overshadowed by what she wore during the climb. Her hiking attire included a hip-length tunic, tall climbing boots, and a pair of baggy-kneed knickerbockers trousers, and a felt hat she secured with a veil. At the time, Peck's unusual climbing costume attracted the press's attention and prompted public discussion and debate on the question of what women should do and what they can aspire to become.

Peck climbed 18,406-foot (5,610 m) Pico de Orizaba and also Popocatepetl in Mexico in 1897. At the time her climb of Orizaba was the highest ascent in the Americas ever made by a woman. Three years later, in 1900, she climbed Monte Cristallo in the Italian Dolomites, the Jungfrau in Switzerland's Bernese Alps, and the Fünffingerspitze in Austria. Peck also helped to found the American Alpine Club in 1902.

Although already over fifty years old, Peck wanted to make a record-setting climb. She traveled to South America in 1903, looking for a mountain taller than the 6,960-metre (22,830 ft) Aconcagua in Argentina. She attempted Illampú in Bolivia in 1903 and again in 1904. Accompanied by two Swiss mountain guides in 1908, her expedition was the first to climb the north peak of the 6,768-metre (22,205 ft) Huascarán in Peru. The south peak of Huascarán, which is taller than the north peak, was first climbed by Germans in 1932.

Peck's accomplishment would have bested Fanny Bullock Workman's ascent of the Himalayan Pinnacle Peak, at 6,930 metres (22,740 ft) it was the world record for highest altitude climb; however, Workman challenged Peck's claim of the new world's highest altitude record during her Huascarán climb. To validate her challenge, Workman paid engineers to recalculate Peck's altitude by triangulating the peak. The engineers established that Peck's Huascarán calculations had been wrong; she had misjudged the altitude by about 600 metres (2,000 ft), calculating it as 7,300 metres (24,000 ft) due to broken altimeters, meaning that Peck had obtained the Americas record in the Western Hemisphere, while Workman remained the world record holder for highest altitude climb.

In 1911, at the age of 61, Peck climbed one of the five peaks on 21,083-foot (6,426 m) Coropuna in Peru. Peck, an ardent suffragist, when she reached the top of Coropuna, Peck placed a "Votes for Women" banner at the summit. Peck later wrote a book about her experiences called A Search for the Apex of America: High Mountain Climbing in Peru and Bolivia, including the Conquest of Huascaran, with Some Observations on the Country and People Below (1911). Her famous quote, "My home is where my trunk is," originated from this book.

== Later years ==
In 1929–30, Peck made a seven-month trip, "mostly by airplane," around South America in order to demonstrate the ease and safety of commercial flights for airline passengers. Her journey was the longest by air by a North American traveler at the time. After returning to the United States, she published her fourth and final book: Flying Over South America: Twenty Thousand Miles by Air (1932). Peck also continued to scale mountains into her old age. She climbed New Hampshire's 1,638-metre (5,374 ft) Mount Madison, her final mountain, at the age of eighty-two.

Peck wrote two additional books about her travels, The South American Tour: A Descriptive Guide (1913) and Industrial and Commercial South America (1922). In addition to becoming a founding member of the American Alpine Club in 1902, Peck became president of the Joan of Arc Suffrage League in 1914; a fellow of the Royal Geographical Society in 1917; and was admitted to the Society of Woman Geographers in 1928.

== Death and legacy ==
Peck, who never married, started a world tour in 1935 at the age of eighty-four, but became ill while climbing the Acropolis of Athens. She returned to her home at the Hotel Monterey in New York City and died of bronchial pneumonia on July 18, 1935. Peck's remains were cremated and her ashes were buried in the North Burial Ground cemetery in Providence, Rhode Island.

Peck was remembered for her "adventurous spirit" in the sport of mountaineering, but her climbing accomplishments are not well known in the present-day. Her personal papers (1873–1935), including diaries, correspondence, and photographs are housed at the Brooklyn College Library Archives and Special Collections.

== Honors and awards ==
- In 1927 the Lima Geographical Society renamed the 6,648-metre (21,811 ft) northern peak of Huascarán the Cumbre Aña Peck in her honor as its first climber.
- In 1930 Luis E. Feliú, the consulate of Chile, awarded Peck the Decoration al Merito on behalf of the Chilean government.
- Recognized for her contributions to South American trade and industry, Peru's government awarded her a gold medal for her exploration in "biographical and industrial data," and for "her ascents to the lofty summits of the Peruvian Andes."

== Selected published works ==
Peck wrote magazine articles and authored four books.

- The Search for the Apex of America: High Mountain Climbing in Peru and Bolivia, Including the Conquest of Huascaran, with Some Observations on the Country and People Below (1911)
- The South American Tour (1913)
- Industrial and Commercial South America (1922)
- Flying Over South America: Twenty Thousand Miles by Air (1932)

== See also ==
- List of female adventurers
- List of suffragists and suffragettes
