= Gun (disambiguation) =

A gun is an object that propels a projectile through a hollow tube, primarily as weaponry.

Gun(s) may also refer to:

== Implements ==
- Cannon
- Artillery
- Deluge gun
- Water gun
- Light gun, a pistol-shaped gaming controller
- Gun (staff), a weapon used in Chinese martial arts

== Places ==
- Gun, a former administrative District of Japan
- Gun, a Korean county
- Gunnersbury station, London, England, National Rail station code
- Kőszeg or Güns, a town in Hungary

== People ==
- Gun (Korean name), a given name in Korean
- Gun (Swedish name), a feminine given name in Swedish
- Gün, a Turkish name
- Katharine Gun (born 1974), a former GCHQ employee and whistleblower
- Lance Gun (1903–1958), Australian cricketer
- Richard Gun (born 1936), Australian politician
- Tracii Guns (born 1966), American guitarist
- Alice Gun, English musician
- Gun (Chinese mythology) (鯀), mythological man and appointed flood control engineer, the father of Yu the Great, or, in other accounts, a legendary giant fish
- Gun, an alternative name in the United Kingdom for a shooter, particularly in the hunting of game birds

== Groups, companies, organizations ==
- Gun Media, an American video game developer based in Lexington, Kentucky
- Gun (St. Paul's Churchyard), a historical bookseller in London

== Art, entertainment, and media ==
=== Films ===
- Gun (2010 film), an American film
- Gun (2011 film), an Indian film
- Guns (1990 film), an American film
- Guns (1980 film), a French crime drama film
- The Gun (film), a television film directed by John Badham

=== Gaming ===
- Gun (cellular automaton), a pattern in Conway's Game of Life
- Gun (video game), a video game set in the 1880s in the American West
- Guardian Units of Nations (G.U.N.), an organization in the Sonic The Hedgehog series of video games

=== Literature ===
- "Guns" (essay), a non-fiction essay by Stephen King
- The Gun (Chivers book), a 2010 non-fiction book by C. J. Chivers
- The Gun (novel), a 1933 novel by C. S. Forester
- "The Gun" (short story), a short story by Philip K. Dick
- Gun, a character from the horror comic series Witch Creek Road

=== Music ===
==== Groups and labels ====
- Gun (band), a Scottish hard rock band 1987–1997, 2008 onwards
- GUN Records, a record label
- Gun (1960s band), an English hard rock band, late 1960s
- Gun (rapper), a South Korean rapper

==== Albums and EPs ====
- Guns (EP), a 1992 EP by Negativland
- Guns (Cardiacs album), 1999
- Guns (Quelle Chris album), 2019

==== Songs ====
- "Gun" (song), a 2013 song by Chvrches
- "Gun", a 1993 single by Gigolo Aunts from the album Flippin' Out
- "Gun", a 2012 single by Serebro from the album Mama Lover
- "Gun," a song from the Soundgarden album Louder Than Love
- "Gun," a song by Doja Cat from the album Scarlet, 2023
- "Gun", a song by John Cale from the album Fear
- "Gun", a song by War from the album The Black-Man's Burdon
- "Gun.", a song by My Chemical Romance from the album Number Two, part of the compilation album Conventional Weapons
- "Guns", a song by Quelle Chris from the eponymous album Guns
- “Guns”, a song by Coldplay from the album Everyday Life
- "The Gun", a song by Lou Reed from his album The Blue Mask
- "Gun Song", by the Lumineers from the 2016 album Cleopatra

=== Television ===
==== Episodes ====
- "The Gun", Dragnet season 1, episode 15 (1967)
- "The Gun", Dynasty season 2, episode 18 (1982)
- "The Gun", Family Matters season 6, episode 15 (1995)
- "The Gun", Gimme a Break! season 5, episode 17 (1986)
- "The Gun", Gunsmoke season 16, episode 9 (1970)
- "The Gun", Joe's World episode 9 (1980)
- "The Gun", Katts and Dog season 2, episode 6 (1989)
- "The Gun", Lassie season 1, episode 4 (1954)
- "The Gun", M*A*S*H season 4, episode 14 (1975)
- "The Gun", Marion and Geoff series 1, episode 2 (2000)
- "The Gun", Tales of Wells Fargo season 2, episode 32 (1958)
- "The Gun", Terrahawks series 1, episode 7 (1983)
- "The Gun", The Outer Limits season 6, episode 2 (2000)
- "The Gun", The Professionals series 4, episode 10 (1980)

==== Shows ====
- Gun (TV series), a short-lived anthology series produced by Robert Altman
- Guns (miniseries), a Canadian television miniseries that aired on CBC Television in 2008

==== Topics ====
- "The Gun", an alternate title for the unproduced Seinfeld episode "The Bet"

== Languages ==
- Gun language, a Gbe language spoken in Benin and Nigeria
- Mbyá Guaraní language (ISO-639 language code gun)

== Other uses ==
- Clathrate gun hypothesis, a hypothesised geological event where rises in sea temperatures (and/or falls in sea level) can trigger the sudden release of methane from methane clathrate
- Gun Inn, a public house in Hollingworth, Greater Manchester, England
- Guns, slang in sports & bodybuilding, for human biceps muscles
- Gunslayer Legend, a multimedia franchise including manga, a video game, and animated series

== See also ==
- Gunn (disambiguation)
- Gunner (disambiguation)
- Gunning (disambiguation)
- Güns (disambiguation)
- Gunz (disambiguation) or Günz
- Pistol (disambiguation)
- Kun (disambiguation)
