= Güns =

Güns or Guens may refer to:

- Kőszeg, Hungary (German: Güns)
- Kőszeg Mountains, Hungary (German: Günser Gebirge)
- Gyöngyös (river) (German: Güns), Austria and Hungary, tributary of the Rába

== People with the surname ==
- Akiva Güns (1761–1837), birth name of Akiva Eger, a Hungarian-Polish rabbi

== See also ==
- Guns (disambiguation)
- Gün, a surname
