= Şengül =

Şengül is a Turkish surname, that could be also use as female given name. Translates to "happy rose" or "joyful flower" in Turkish, derived from Persian word شنگول (shangūl) meaning merry, cheerful; "şen" meaning joyful or happy, and "gül" meaning rose. Notable people with the surname include:

- Berfin Şengül (born 2002), Turkish curler
- Sabriye Şengül (born 1988), Turkish female boxer, kickboxer and mixed martial artist
- Yağmur Şengül (born 1994), Turkish female para archer
- Ziya Şengül (1944–2023), Turkish footballer

== See also ==
- Şengül, Tercan
- Şengün
