= MAIET Entertainment =

Defunct South Korean video game company

- Type: Private
- Industry: Video games
- Founded: 1998
- Defunct: 2015
- Headquarters: Seoul, South Korea
- Products: GunZ: The Duel GunZ: The Duel 2 RaiderZ AceSaga
- Website: www.maietentertainment.com

MAIET Entertainment was a South Korean video game developer, best known for creating the third-person shooter game GunZ: The Duel in 2004. They also developed GunZ 2 in 2011 and adapted it into English in 2013.

== Etymology ==
According to the official site, MAIET is 'TEAM' spelled backwards with the letter 'I' added in, standing for 'innovation'.

== History ==
The company started out as a small group of five researchers which eventually grew into a company. In 2015 MAIET was dissolved, giving gaming rights to Masangsoft Inc.(마상소프트) The founder and CEO, Venister, went off to work on several different ventures including a new gaming studio named Onion Crew.

== Products ==
GunZ: The Duel has servers in Korea, and has all evolved from the original International server in many ways, such as having "cash items". MAIET's first developed video game was the aerial strategy game AceSaga, which was terminated.
