= Khun =

Khun may refer to:

- Khun (คูน, long vowel, middle tone), the colloquial Thai name for the Golden Shower Tree
- Khun (courtesy title) (คุณ, short vowel, middle tone), a common Thai honorific
- Khun (noble title) (ขุน, short vowel, rising tone), a former royally bestowed Thai noble title
- Khün language

== Places ==
- Khun, Bushehr, a village in Bushehr Province, Iran

== See also ==
- KHUN, an American radio station
- Thai name
