= Game gun =

Game gun or variation may refer to:

- Hunting gun, a gun used to hunt game
- Light gun, a video game accessory
  - Gamegun (GAMEGUN), a light gun for 3DO
- Game controllers shaped like a gun
- Toy gun
  - Water gun
  - Pop gun
  - Cap gun
- Airsoft gun, guns used for recreational play, such as in tagball matches, paintball games, etc.
- Laser tag guns, used to play games of laser tag

== See also ==
- Gun (video game), a video game named "Gun"
- Gun fu, a fictional martial art that uses guns as its focal weapon, used in fictional games of guns
- Gungame (disambiguation)
- Gun (disambiguation)
- Game (disambiguation)
