= Şengün =

Şengün (Turkish pronunciation: [ˈʃæɲɟyn]) is a Turkish name. Translates to "happy day" or "joyful day" in Turkish, derived from "şen" meaning joyful or happy, and "gün" meaning day. Notable people with the surname include:

- Alperen Şengün (born 2002), Turkish basketball player
- Aylin Şengün Taşçı (born 1967), Turkish music artist, journalist, television presenter, academician
- Aysel Sengün
- Hasan Şengün (born 1961), Turkish football player and manager
- İsmail Şengün (1934-2008), Turkish politician
- Köksal Şengün (1950-2025), Turkish lawyer
- Lila Şengün (born 2002), Turkish volleyball player

== Given name ==
- Şengün Kaplanoğlu (born 1938), Turkish basketball player, coach, and sports administrator. The first player to wear the Turkish national basketball team jersey 100 times.

== See also ==
- Şengül
