= RaiderZ =

- Developers: Masangsoft (Former) MAIET Entertainment
- Publisher: (United States) Perfect World Entertainment
- Engine: Realspace 3.0
- Platform: Microsoft Windows
- Genre: MMORPG
- Mode: Online multiplayer

RaiderZ (stylized as RaiderZ) was a massively multiplayer online role-playing game (MMORPG) developed by the now defunct Korean developer MAIET Entertainment. It was published in North America in November 2012 by Perfect World Entertainment. The game is free-to-play and no monthly subscription fee is required due to the service being funded by real money transactions via the in-game cash shop.

On July 14, 2017 the RaiderZ Facebook page posted an update stating "Journey's Begin"

== Plot ==
RaiderZ takes place in the once prosperous and powerful kingdom of Rendel that is being overrun by marauding monsters.

== Gameplay ==
RaiderZ offers classic MMORPG gameplay features such as guilds, quests, dungeons, crafting and player versus player battles. It also introduces a non-targeting combat system where players actively participate in combat, similar to TERA. In addition to that, players will be able to cut or break off special body parts of special enemies and use these against them. Combat is skill based and each individual attack or ability must be aimed manually. Dodging enemy attacks, especially during boss fights, is crucial to achieving victory. Another difference from other MMORPGs is the unique character progression. There are no set classes and after reaching level 10, players can choose from a wide range of skills to develop their characters in any way they want.

European Publisher Gameforge emphasizes that RaiderZ is "not a casual game" but instead is very challenging for even the most experienced players. One example of this is the fact that players will be able to fight against giant boss monsters on their own, even though it is advised to engage them in groups.

=== Action combat ===
RaiderZ blends gameplay features of MMORPGs with Third Person Action games, allowing players to actively participate in combat. Instead of the typical point & click controls used in most MMORPGs, RaiderZ requires players to precisely swing their weapons, dodge enemy attacks and maneuver around opponents to get into a better position. However, using special skills that can be placed into a skill bar still plays a big role in RaiderZ.

=== Boss fights ===
Fighting against strong and big boss enemies is one of the main features of Raider (e.g. horns, claws) that can be used as shields or weapons or will provide special abilities for a short period of time. Bosses in RaiderZ also use several special abilities like swallowing or grabbing players at random.

=== Crafting ===
New pieces of armor and weapons are only gained through the crafting system. Players will have to fight against enemies or trade with other players to obtain component parts that are used to create new equipment. The majority of these items will be bound to the character that made it, however, the resources and the appropriate recipes won't.

=== Musical instruments ===
Players will be able to learn to play certain musical instruments such as guitars and join other players to create beautiful music. These instruments will be combined with quest lines and once the player has finished the relevant quests, they can buy the instrument and start playing different notes.

=== Enchanting ===
Players can enchant their items through magical stones acquired in-game or through the cash shop, there are 2 types of magic stones, which helps the item to level up, and the one that protects the item from breaking when attempting to enchant, and also has chances of decreasing the enchant grade.

=== Factions ===
The factions of the game help the player to choose their in-game positioning, whether to be an ally of the nation or against it, there are 3 levels within the faction system, the first is the normal, the second friendly, and the third reliable, from these levels it is possible to create different items using items collected in the game.
