= Gun (Swedish name) =

- Gender: Female

Gun or Gunn is an old name formed from gunnr (battle) and is cognate with the Old English word "gúð". Gunnr is one of the valkyries. The equivalent male name is Gunnar.

The earliest attestation of the name is on the Rök runestone where it occurs as part of a kenning for wolf: I say this the twelfth, where the horse of Gunnr sees fodder on the battlefield, where twenty kings lie...

Gun is the 56th most common female name in Sweden as of December 31, 2008, when 34,655 living people were named Gun in Sweden.

== Famous Guns ==
- Gun Adler, actress
- Gun Nathalie Björn, Swedish footballer
- Gun Andersson, actress
- Gun Arvidsson, actress
- Gun Carlson, politician
- Gun Fors, actress
- Gun Hellberg, actress
- Gun Hellsvik, Swedish minister for Justice
- Gun Holmquist, actress
- Gun Holmqvist, actress
- Gun Jönsson, actress
- Gun Kessle, artist, married to Jan Myrdal
- Gun Lund, dancer and choreographer
- Gun Robertson, actress
- Gun Skoogberg, ballerina

== General sources ==
- English etymology of Norse names, referencing other names with gunnr root
- Swedish-language source
