= Mario Piacenza =

Italian mountain climber (1884–1957)

Mario Piacenza (born 21 April 1884 in Pollone; died 16 April 1957 in Biella) was an Italian mountain climber, ethnologist and explorer.

In 1911, Piacenza reached the summit of the Matterhorn from the Furggen ridge, together with J.J. Carrel and J. Gaspard .

In 1913 he organized and led an exploration of the Ladakh, reaching the summit of Nun at 23,616 feet (7,198 m) in Indian Kashmir together with Borelli and Gaspard, then the summit of the Z3 peak, naming it Cima Italia (lit. 'Italia Peak', 6,189 m). During this expedition he took thousands of photographs of the regions visited and their people, most of which are collected in Nel Himálaia Cashmiriano: spedizione Mario Piacenza by Cesare Calciati (Milan 1930).

After World War II, Piacenza became director of the Museo nazionale della montagna in Turin, a post that he held until his death in 1957.

== See also ==
- Fratelli Piacenza
