= GunZ: The Duel =

2005 video game

- Developer: MAIET Entertainment
- Publishers: MAIET Entertainment: KOR: Netmarble; NA: Aeria Games and Entertainment; BR: Level Up! Games
- Engine: Realspace v2.0
- Platform: Microsoft Windows
- Release: June 2005 (Beta Edition): KOR: June 2003; NA: November 2006; EU: November 2006; BR: July 2006; IND: June 2006
- Genre: Third-person shooter
- Modes: Online multiplayer, online campaign

GunZ: The Duel (Korean: 건즈 온라인), or simply GunZ, is an online third-person shooting game, originally created by South Korean-based MAIET Entertainment and currently owned by MasangSoft.

It is free-to-play, with a microtransaction business model for purchasing premium in-game items. The game allows players to perform exaggerated, gravity-defying action moves, including wall running, stunning, tumbling, and blocking bullets with swords, in the style of action films and anime.

GunZ: The Duel Remastered was released in 2026.

== Gameplay ==
In Quest mode, players, in a group of up to 4 members, went through parts of a map for a certain number of stages, which were determined by the quest level. In each stage, players were required to kill 18 to 44 creatures, and the game ended when every member of the player team died or completed all of the stages. Quests could take place in the Prison, Mansion, or Dungeon map.

Players could make the quests tougher and more profitable by using special quest items to increase the quest level that could be bought from the in-game store or obtained during a quest. Quest items in-game were stored in glowing chests that spawned where the monster that it came from died; certain items could have been dropped depending on the monster killed. Players ran through these to obtain an item randomly selected from the possibilities of that monster. The items obtained depended on the monster that the chest came from. By sacrificing certain items in combination, players could enter a boss quest. Boss items were obtained through pages and other boss quests, and pages were obtained through the in-game shop. The quest system was designed to reduce the amount of time needed to prepare for boss raids that are typical in many other online games.

A player is congratulated for killing multiple players in a short amount of time

A significant and unique part of the gameplay was the movement system. Players could run on walls, perform flips off of them, and do quick mid-air dodges in any horizontal direction. Advanced movement and combat techniques were commonly referred to as "K-Style" or Korean style; a variety of techniques fell under this category. These usually exploited the game's animation and weapon switch systems through a series of animation cancellations to allow the player to perform another action rapidly after the first.

GunZ's networking system in most parts of the game was peer-to-peer. Players connect to other players through their client, instead of through a central server.

== Development and release ==
The closed beta for ijji GunZ ended on November 17, 2006. ijji GunZ subsequently went live on November 29, 2006. The live service included clan wars and quest mode. The premium item shop was opened on January 8, 2007. Quest mode was updated on February 14, 2007. New sounds and voice narrations were added to the game on May 9, 2007.

The game was managed on an international gaming portal by ijji games until management shifted to the Aeria Games gaming portal in March 2012.

In the first week of May 2013 (1st on the forums and on the homepage), Aeria announced that the game would be cancelled on May 31, and that the forums would be deleted in June. They stated that only AP purchased during those final four weeks would be refunded, and that AP purchased in prior months/years used to build characters would not be refunded to players.

This closure happened two months following the announcement that GunZ 2 would be released for free in English on Steam.

In 2016, Masangsoft picked up the rights to both GunZ: The Duel and GunZ 2.

In 2024, GunZ: The Duel was added to the Steam store. GunZ: The Duel Remastered was released on 14 August 2026.

== Critical reception ==
PC Gamer UK awarded Gunz a 55% review score. MMOHuts gave the game a 3.6 out of 5.

== Sequel ==
In July 2008, MAIET signed a contract to release the sequel for GunZ, titled GunZ: The Second Duel. The Second Duel was to be created more inline with what the creators had originally planned for the original game. In March 2009, MAIET pushed back the date of release from 2009 to 2011, citing "new materials".

== See also ==
- ijji
- Netmarble
