= Pistol Pete =

Pistol Pete may refer to:

== People ==
- Frank Eaton (1860–1958), American scout, Indian fighter and cowboy
- Peter Handscomb (born 1991), Australian cricketer
- Pete Loncarevich (born 1966), American former bicycle (BMX) racer
- Pete Maravich (1947–1988), American basketball player
- Pete Pedro (c. 1942 – 2018), American football player
- Pete Reiser (1919–1981), American baseball player
- Peter Rollack (born c. 1974), founder and leader of the Bronx-based street gang Sex Money Murda
- Pete Sampras (born 1971), American tennis player
- Peter Smith (curler) (born 1964), Scottish curler
- Leon Dorsey (1975–2008), American serial killer; nicknamed "Pistol Pete" while incarcerated

== Mascots ==
- Pistol Pete (New Mexico State University), the mascot for New Mexico State University athletics
- Pistol Pete (Oklahoma State University), the mascot for Oklahoma State University–Stillwater athletics
- Pistol Pete (University of Wyoming), the mascot for University of Wyoming athletics

== Other uses ==
- Pete (Disney), a Disney character, and nemesis of Mickey Mouse, once known by the alias 'Pistol Pete'
- the daughter of Pete on the Disney animated television series Goof Troop
- nickname of a Japanese Type 92 10 cm cannon captured by the Americans in World War II
- Pistol Pete, a sitcom pilot created by John Swartzwelder
- Pistol Pete's Pizza, a defunct Arizona restaurant chain bought out by Peter Piper Pizza
