= Kun Yang =

Chinese physicist

Kun Yang (Chinese: 杨昆; born 1967), is a Chinese physicist.

He received a bachelor of science from Fudan University in 1989. In 1994 he got his Ph.D. in the condensed matter theory from the Indiana University Bloomington. From 1994 to 1997, he worked as a postdoctoral research associate at Princeton University and from 1997 to 1999, he was the Sherman Fairchild's senior research fellow at California Institute of Technology. He joined the faculty of Florida State University in 1999 and since then dedicated his life to study unconventional superconductors and quantum magnetism. Currently he is a professor at the Florida State University and is an author of over 80 peer-reviewed articles.
