= Wang Kun =

Wang Kun may refer to:

- Wang Kun (singer) (1925–2014), Chinese opera singer, actress, and musical director
- Wang Kun (footballer) (born 1985), Chinese association footballer
