= Fanny Bullock Workman =

American mountaineer (1859–1925)

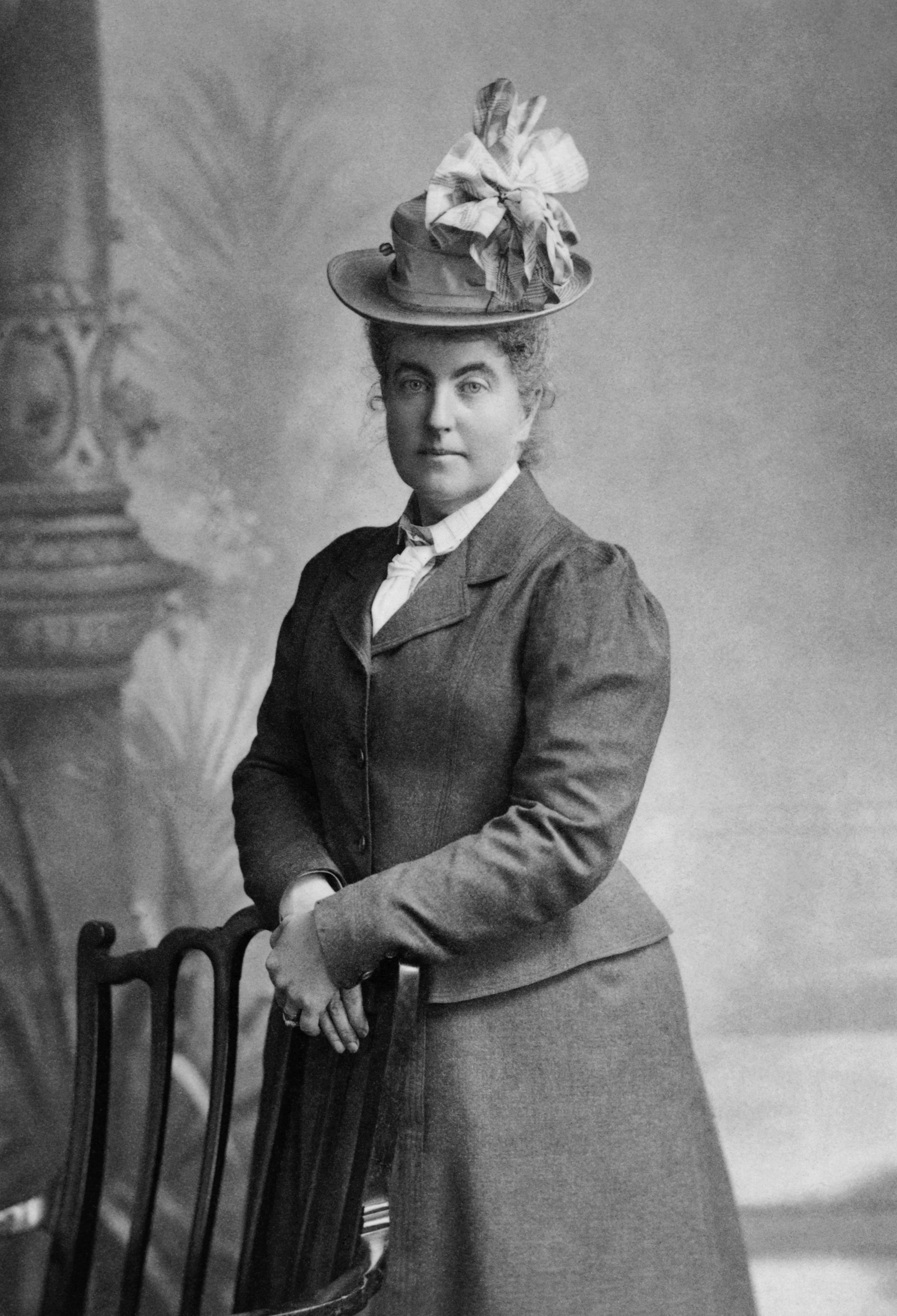
- Fanny Bullock Workman

Personal information
- Born: Fanny Bullock; January 8, 1859 Worcester, Massachusetts, U.S.
- Died: January 22, 1925 (aged 66) Cannes, France
- Occupations: Mountaineer, Cartographer, travel writer, explorer
- Spouse: William Hunter Workman (m. 1882)
- Children: 2, including Rachel
- Father: Alexander Bullock

Climbing career
- Major ascents: Skoro La Glacier; Koser Gunge; Chogo Lungma Glacier; Pyramid Peak; Nun Kun; Pinnacle Peak; Hispar Glacier; Biafo Glacier; Siachen Glacier; Indira Col

Fanny Bullock Workman (January 8, 1859 – January 22, 1925) was an American mountaineer, explorer, cartographer, and travel writer known for her expeditions in the Himalayas and the Karakoram. One of the first women to pursue mountaineering as a professional career, she combined exploration with scientific observation and published detailed accounts of her journeys. During the late nineteenth and early twentieth centuries she set several women's altitude records and advocated for women's suffrage and women's participation in exploration and science.

Workman was born in Worcester, Massachusetts, into a wealthy and politically prominent family. After receiving an extensive education and traveling widely in Europe, she married physician William Hunter Workman in 1882. She developed an interest in climbing in the White Mountains of New Hampshire, and the couple later undertook long-distance bicycle tours across Europe, North Africa, and Asia. These journeys established Workman as a travel writer and led to a series of expedition narratives describing both the landscapes she encountered and the position of women in the societies she visited.

Beginning in the late 1890s, Workman turned to high-altitude mountaineering in the western Himalayas and the Karakoram. Over the next fourteen years she participated in eight expeditions to the region, exploring glaciers, surveying previously unmapped terrain, and climbing several peaks. In 1906 she climbed Pinnacle Peak in the Nun Kun massif to an altitude of about 23,000 feet (7,000 m), setting a women's altitude record at the time. After these expeditions she lectured widely in Europe and North America, becoming the first American woman to lecture at the Sorbonne and the second woman to address the Royal Geographical Society. Her climbing achievements and public advocacy helped challenge gender barriers in exploration and mountaineering.

== Biography ==
=== Early life and education ===
Fanny Bullock Workman was born on 8 January 1859 in Worcester, Massachusetts, to Elvira Hazard Bullock and Alexander H. Bullock, a prominent businessman and Republican politician who later served as governor of Massachusetts. She was the youngest of three children, with an elder sister, Grace Bullock, and a brother, Alexander H. Bullock Jr. Her family emphasized education, travel, and intellectual engagement, which influenced the independence and ambition that later defined her career. Workman was educated at home by governesses before attending Miss Graham's Finishing School in New York City. She later studied in Paris and Dresden, where she became fluent in French and German and grew familiar with European culture. Her education combined formal schooling with extended travel, providing her with the language skills and cultural familiarity that later supported her work as a travel writer and explorer.

In 2012, in his biography of Workman, Thomas Pauly writes that "early on Fanny chafed at the constraints of her privilege". A small number of her stories from this time survive, describing her interest in adventure. In one, "A Vacation Episode", she describes a beautiful and aristocratic English girl who is contemptuous of society. She runs away to Grindelwald, becoming an excellent alpinist and marrying an American. The story encapsulates much of Fanny's own life: wanderlust, a love of the mountains, and a commitment to women's rights. In 1886, she published a short story, set during the First Indian War, in New York Magazine about "the capture and rescue of a white girl"; a reviewer of the story stated that it was "told in a very pleasant and infatuating style".

=== Marriage and early climbing ===
On 16 June 1882, at the age of 23, Fanny Bullock married William Hunter Workman.Twelve years her senior, William was a physician educated at Yale and Harvard universities. The couple shared an interest in travel and physical activity and they spent extended periods cycling through Europe, which later shaped their work as explorers and travel writers. In 1884, their daughter Rachel was born. Over the following years, Workman and her husband spent long periods traveling abroad. Their daughter did not accompany them on most of these journeys and instead remained in the care of others.

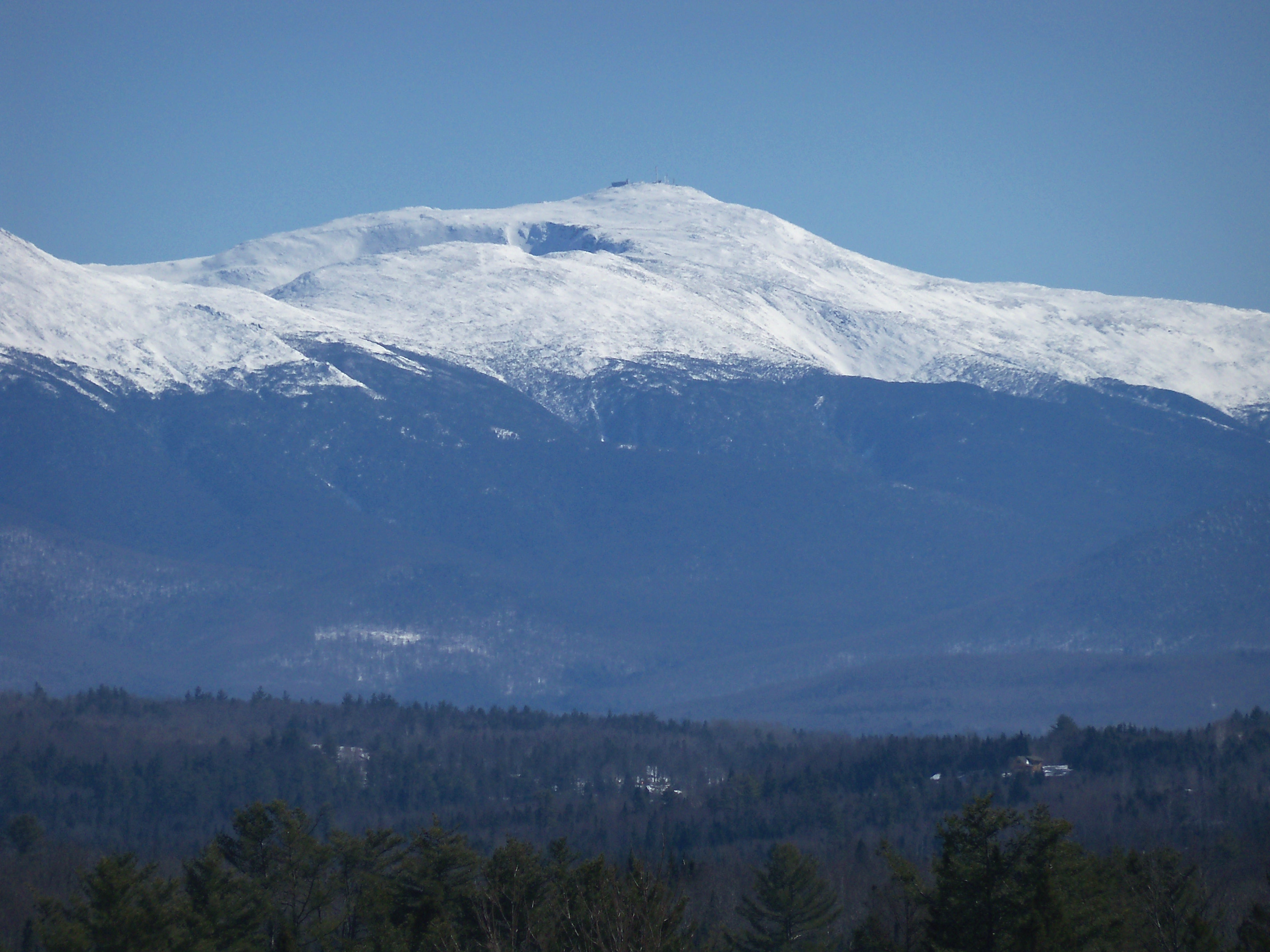
Fanny Workman learned her love of climbing on Mount Washington.

William Workman introduced Fanny Workman to climbing after their marriage, and together they spent many summers in the White Mountains in New Hampshire; here she summited Mount Washington (6,293 feet or 1,918 metres) several times. Climbing in the Northeastern United States allowed Fanny to develop her abilities together with other women. Unlike European clubs, American climbing clubs in the White Mountains allowed women members and encouraged women to climb. They promoted a new vision of the American woman, one who was both domestic and athletic. By 1886, women sometimes outnumbered men on hiking expeditions in New England. In her paper on the gender dynamics of climbing in the region, Jenny Ernie-Steighner states that this formative experience shaped Workman's commitment to women's rights, pointing out that "no other well-known international mountaineers of the time, male or female, spoke as openly and fervently about women's rights". However, both of the Workmans disliked the provincial nature of life in Worcester, where they resided, and wished to live in Europe. After both their fathers died, leaving them enormous estates, the couple embarked on their first major European trip, a tour of Scandinavia and Germany.

== Move to Europe and cycling tours ==
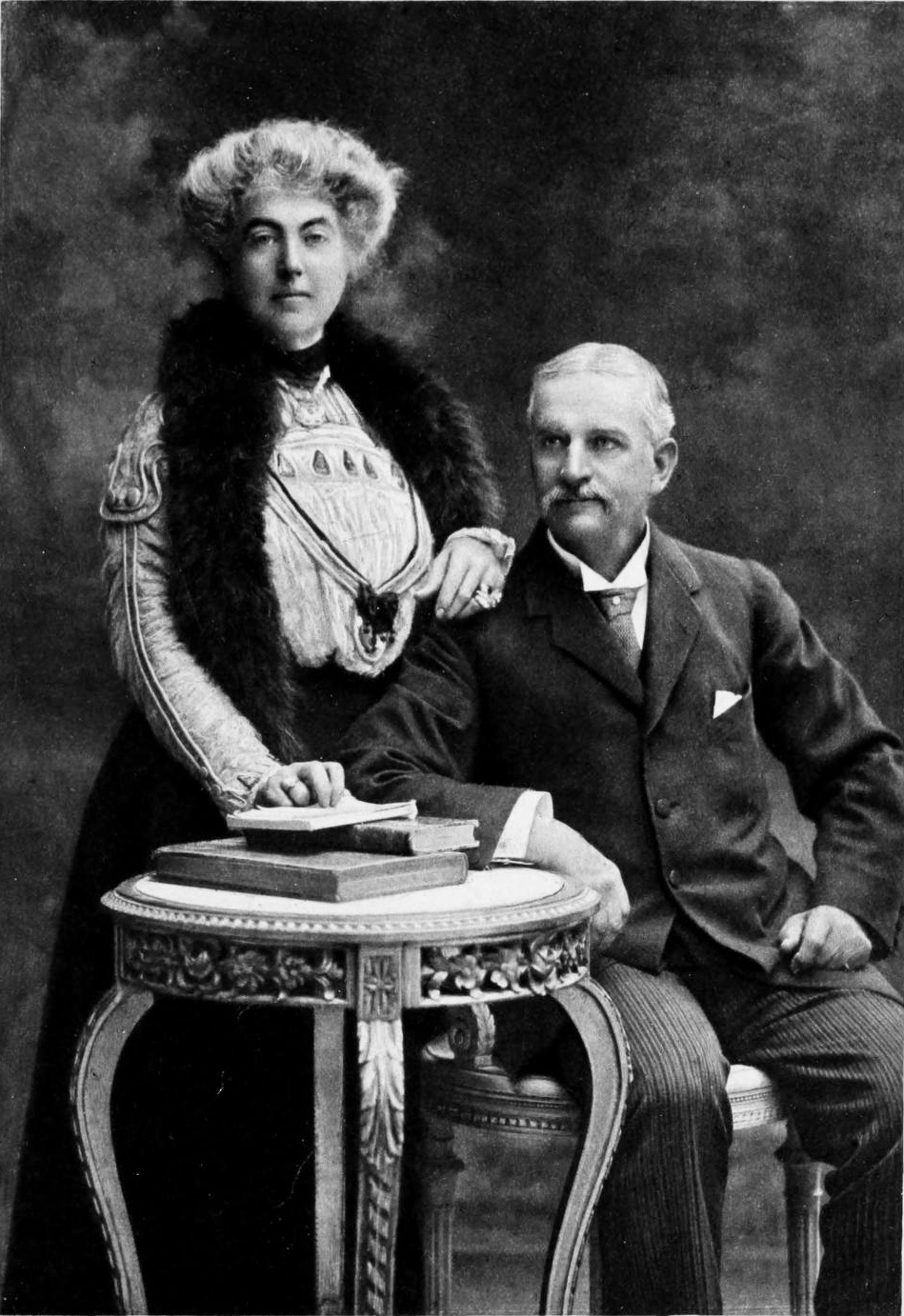
Portrait of Fanny and William

=== Relocation to Europe and the turn to travel ===
In 1889 the Workman family relocated to Germany due to William Workman's health, although Pauly speculates that this may have been merely a pretext because he recovered surprisingly quickly. The couple's second child, Siegfried, was born shortly after they arrived in Dresden. Fanny Workman chose not to conform to the traditionally circumscribed roles of wife and mother, and became an author and adventurer. Less than a year after Siegfried's birth, the two children were entrusted to nurses, allowing both parents to embark on a series of journeys on a safety bicycle, a recently popular invention.

She lived a vigorous life that diverged from idealized femininity in the 1800s. As a feminist, Fanny considered herself an example of the idea that women could equal and excel over men in the arduous life, and embodied the New Woman ethos of the day.

Through cycling, Fanny sought more than simple exercise, liberation form the painful memories of her son and an escape to the exotic. She completely disregarded societal expectations of the traditional wife committed to family life. Instead, she aimed at a different identity, one that freed her from conventional female responsibilities and that also allowed her to pursue her own ambitions.

Moreover, as Miller points out in her book about women explorers, since the ideal family of the time was a large one and information about birth control was not easily available, William's medical knowledge must have been invaluable. The Workmans left their children with nurses while they took long trips.

What started as simple trips to near cities soon transformed into complex cycling expeditions through countries like Italy, France, or Switzerland.

=== European expeditions and mountaineering ===
Between 1888 and 1893, the Workmans took bicycling tours of Switzerland, France, and Italy.

In 1891, Fanny became one of the first women to climb Mont Blanc. She also was one of the first women to climb the Jungfrau and the Matterhorn; her guide was Peter Taugwalder, who had made the first ascent with Edward Whymper.

In 1893, Siegfried died from a combination of influenza and pneumonia. After his death, according to Pauly, Workman, through her bicycle tours, "aggressively pursued an alternative identity, one that liberated her from the conventional responsibilities of wife and mother and allowed for her interests and ambitions".

In 1893, the couple decided to explore areas beyond Europe and headed for Algeria, Indochina, and India. These longer trips were Fanny's idea.

The couple's first extended tour was a 2,800-mile (4,500 km) bicycle trip across Spain in 1895; each of them carried 20 pounds (9.1 kg) of luggage and they averaged 45 miles (72 km) a day, sometimes riding up to 80 miles (130 km).

They missed their daughter's wedding to Sir Alexander MacRobert in 1911 while exploring in the Karakoram.

=== Travel writing and themes ===
Together, the Workmans explored the world and co-wrote eight travel books that describe the people, art, and architecture of the areas they journeyed through, however she always did most of the writing. Fanny opted not to write a book about her journey to Egypt, likely because she recognised that she could not rely on her bicycle to spark curiosity in the country's saturated tourist attractions.

The Workmans were aware of their contribution to the genre of travel writing, as they commented on other writers in their own works. Their mountaineering narratives said little about the culture of those remote and sparsely inhabited regions; they included both lyrical descriptions of the sunset, for example, for their popular audience and detailed explanations of geographical features, such as glaciers, for their scientific readership. Fanny and William added scientific elements to their writings to appeal to authoritative organizations such as the Royal Geographical Society; Fanny also believed the science would make her more legitimate in the eyes of the climbing community, but it cost her readers.

In general, their bicycling tour narratives were better received than those about their mountaineering exploits. Fanny wrote the majority of these travel books herself, and in them she commented extensively on the plight of women wherever she traveled.

Stephanie Tingley writes, in her encyclopedia entry on Workman's travel writing, that there is an implied feminist criticism of the hardships women experienced and the inferior status of the women in the societies she encountered. In Algerian Memories Fanny focused on the beauty and romance of the countryside, but also highlighted the abuse and neglect of women in Algerian society. As a strong-willed, outspoken supporter of women's rights, Workman used their travels to demonstrate her own abilities and to highlight the inequities other women lived under.

However, their travel books are written in the first-person plural or third-person singular, so it is difficult to decisively attribute views or voices to either William or Fanny. The Workmans' works are colonialist in that they describe the people they meet and observe as "exotic or unusual, at worst as primitive or even subhuman". However, at times they make it clear that the people they encounter see them in a similar light, demonstrating that they were sometimes aware of their own biases.

== India ==
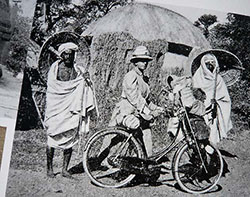
Fanny Bullock Workman on her bicycle tour of India (c. 1897)

The Workmans' trip to India, Burma, Ceylon, and Java lasted two and a half years, beginning in November 1897, and covered 14,000 miles (23,000 km). At the time, Fanny was 38 and William 50. They bicycled about 4,000 miles (6,400 km) from the southernmost tip of India to the Himalaya in the north.

To ensure they had access to supplies, they rode along major thoroughfares near railways, and were sometimes forced to sleep in railway waiting rooms if no other accommodation was available. They carried minimal supplies, including tea, sugar, biscuits, cheese, tinned meats, water, pillows, a blanket for each of them, writing materials, and medical and repair kits.

They dispensed with their bicycles at the northern end of their trip and hiked over passes between 14,000 and 18,000 feet (4,300 and 5,500 m). The trip was grueling. They often had little food or water, dealt with swarms of mosquitoes, fixed as many as 40 bicycle tire punctures per day, and slept in rat-infested quarters.

Fanny Workman's book, written after the trip, highlighted the ancient architecture that they had seen rather than the contemporary local cultures. The Workmans possessed an unusual amount of historical knowledge about India for Westerners of the time and had read the Jakata, Mahabharata, and Ramayana before their trip. They were eager to learn about the culture that had produced these epics and spent more time learning about ancient history than interacting with living people.

Mrs Workman mentions in "My Asiatic Wanderings" about India "I have wheeled through much enchanting scenery, in the palm and banyan grooves of Orissa, Over the green and scarlet slopes of the Terai... But I have never cycled 1200 miles in a country so continuously beautiful."

=== Labor issues ===
The Workmans struggled with labor problems continually, needing local porters to carry gear for them because they could not carry a sufficient amount for themselves for a multi-month expedition. They had to transport Mummery tents, eider sleeping bags, camera equipment, scientific instruments, and a large supply of food. The porters were skeptical of the entire venture. The locals rarely climbed mountains and were not used to taking orders from a woman, which made Fanny's position difficult.

During the summer of 1898, the couple decided to escape the heat and explore the western Himalaya and Karakoram. After that, they intended to explore the area around Kanchenjunga in Sikkim, and then finally travel to the mountains bordering Bhutan on the east.

The most serious problems concerned labor. They hired 45 porters, outfitted them for basic mountain travel, and bought provisions, but costs skyrocketed as news of wealthy Americans circulated in the villages. They could not leave until October 3 and by then cold weather was approaching.

The Workmans complain in their writings about the porters they hired, who were difficult to work with and refused to trek more than five miles (8.0 km) per day. Three days into their journey the Workmans reached snow and the porters rebelled; they refused to work in such cold conditions and forced the entire party to return to Darjeeling.

Bureaucratic difficulties and weather problems abounded and impeded their plans.

The Workmans tried to solve these problems with condescension and high-handedness. Kenneth Mason maintains in his history of Himalayan mountaineering, written in 1955, that "The Workmans were, on their journeys, the victims of their own faults. They were too impatient and rarely tried to understand the mentality of the porters and so did not get the best out of them."

Labor problems beset all of their expeditions because, as Miller puts it, "Almost alone of Victorian travellers, the Workmans had absolutely no sympathy or even common-sense understanding of the local people, into whose poor and remote villages they burst with trains of followers demanding service and supplies."

In her chapter on Workman, Miller argues that the couple, being American, did not have the same sense of caste or class that British explorers had: "the Workmans, like most of their countrymen, plunged in their enterprises headlong, expecting their enormous energy to overcome all obstacles. They were justifiably criticized by the British for their callous, incompetent behavior toward the Indians."

== Mountaineering in the Himalayas ==
We had breathed the atmosphere of that great mountain-world, had drunk of the swirling waters of its glaciers, and feasted our eyes on the incomparable beauty and majesty of its towering peaks, and, as time passed on, its charms asserted their power anew and called to us with irresistible, siren strains to return yet once again to those regions, the grandeur of which satisfies so fully the sense of the beautiful and sublime.

— William and Fanny Workman, The Call of the Snowy Hispar

=== Himalayan expeditions (1899–1903) ===
After travelling to the Himalaya the first time, the Workmans became entranced with climbing and mountaineering. Over a span of 14 years, they traveled eight times to the area, which at the time was almost completely unexplored and unmapped. Their trips were made without the benefit of modern lightweight equipment, freeze-dried foods, sunblock, or radios. On each expedition, they explored, surveyed, and photographed, ultimately reporting on their findings and creating maps. The couple shared and alternated responsibilities; one year Fanny would organize the logistics of their journey and William would work on the scientific projects and the next year they would reverse roles.

After their first trip to the Himalaya and subsequent labor problems, the Workmans hired Matthias Zurbriggen, the best and most experienced mountain climbing guide of the time. Thus, in 1899, with 50 local porters and Zurbriggen, the Workmans began to explore the Biafo Glacier in the Karakoram, but dangerous crevasses and poor weather forced them instead to shift to the Skoro La Glacier and the unclimbed peaks around it.

They reached Siegfriedhorn, an 18,600-foot (5,700 m) summit that she named after her son, giving Fanny an altitude record for women at the time. They next camped at 17,000 feet (5,200 m) and climbed a higher peak of 19,450 feet (5,930 m), naming it Mount Bullock Workman. Admiring the view of a far-off mountain, they commented on the grand view: they were looking at K2, the second-highest mountain in the world. Fanny Workman may have been the first woman recorded to have seen it.

Finally, they climbed Koser Gunge (20,997 feet or 6,400 metres), giving Fanny her third successive altitude record. It was very challenging: they had to hire new porters, establish a new base camp, and remain overnight at around 18,000 feet (5,500 m). In the morning, they climbed a wall that measured 1,200 feet (370 m), and were buffeted by winds. During the summit push, Fanny's fingers were so numb that she could no longer hold her ice ax and one of the porters abandoned them.

Pauly writes, "propelled to the summit by adrenalin and desperation, the foursome lingered only long enough for their instruments to assess that the temperature was ten degrees Fahrenheit [−12 °C] and their elevation was 21,000 feet." Fanny was a "slow, relentless, and intrepid" climber; "bearlike, she solidly planted one foot and then groped for another secure grip with the other". Climbing at the beginning of the 20th century, she did not have specialized equipment like pitons or carabiners. She was able to climb to such heights, Pauly argues, because of "her dauntless persistence and her immunity to altitude sickness".

=== Publications and reception ===
As soon as she was able, Fanny Workman published accounts of her feats, such as an article in the Scottish Geographical Magazine. Writing about this trip at length in In the Ice World of the Himalayas, Fanny made efforts to include scientific information and experiments, touting her own modified barometer as superior, but scholarly critics were unimpressed and pointed out her lack of scientific knowledge. Popular reviewers, on the other hand, enjoyed the book, with one concluding, "We have no hesitation in saying that Dr. and Mrs. Workman have written one of the most remarkable books of travel of recent years."

=== Later expeditions and altitude records (1902–1906) ===
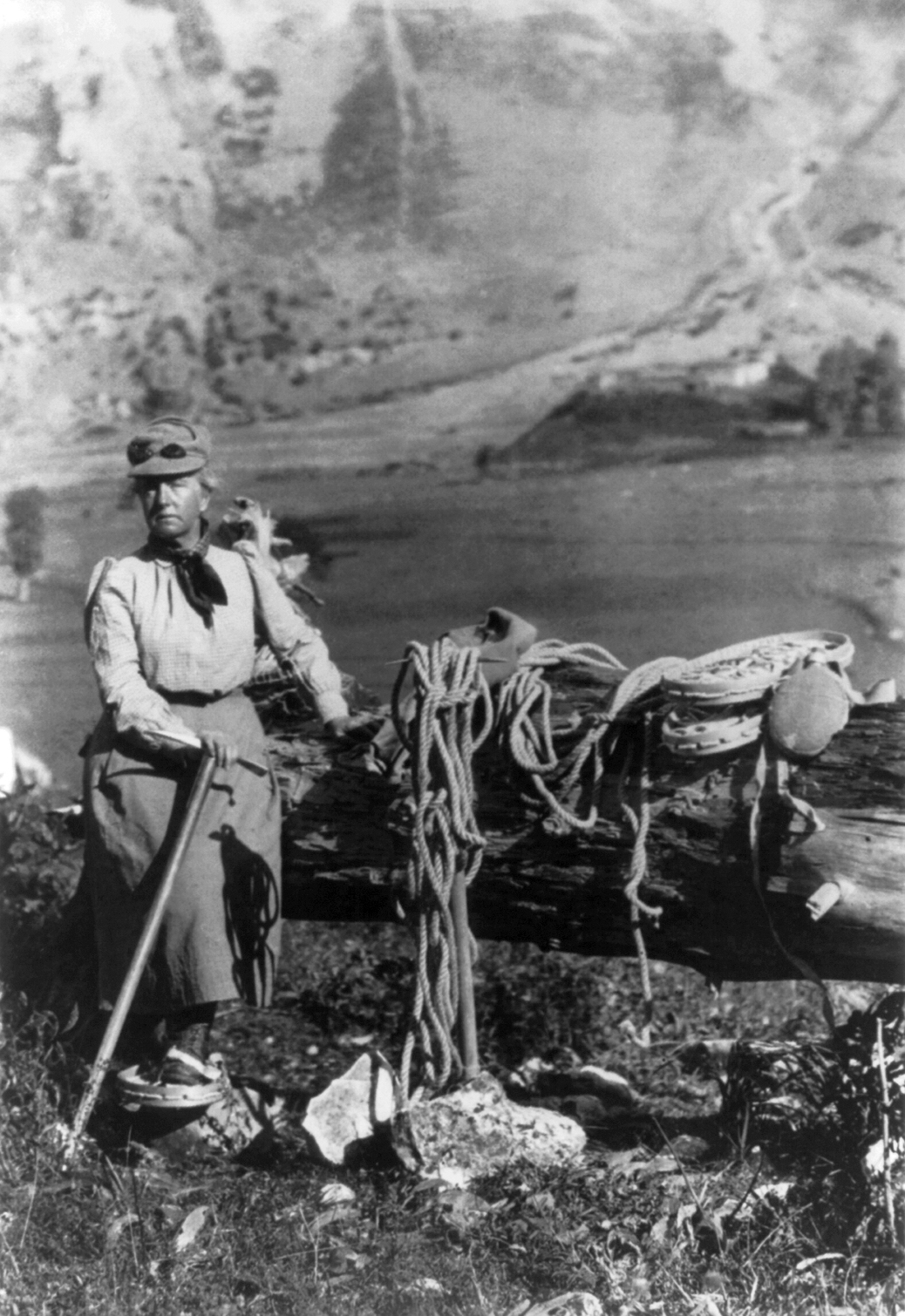
Workman with climbing gear. As one commentator writes, "even though pantaloons were acceptable sporting women's dress at the time, Workman wore skirts – while cycling thousands of miles across Europe and Asia, climbing Himalayan peaks, and negotiating crevasses."

In 1902, the Workmans returned to the Himalaya and became the first Westerners to explore the Chogo Lungma Glacier, starting in Arandu. They hired 80 porters and took four tons of supplies, but their explorations were limited by near-constant snow and a 60-hour storm.

In 1903, they trekked to the Hoh Lumba Glacier with guide Cyprien Savoye. They also attempted to climb the nearby mountain they called Pyramid Peak (later renamed Spantik, as part of the Spantik-Sosbun Mountains).

They camped the first night at 16,200 feet (4,900 m) and the second at 18,600 feet (5,700 m). An ailing porter forced them to camp the third night at 19,355 feet (5,899 m) rather than 20,000 feet (6,100 m) and they eventually left him behind.

They ascended a 22,567-foot (6,878 m) peak, giving Fanny a new altitude record. William and a porter climbed toward the needle-like spire that was the expedition's goal. However, he abandoned the summit attempt a few hundred feet from the top because he realized they could not have descended to a safe altitude before altitude sickness set in.

The Workmans returned to Kashmir in 1906, and were the first Westerners to explore the Nun Kun massif. For this trip, the couple hired six Italian porters from the Alps, 200 local porters, and Savoye returned as guide. As Isserman, Weaver and Molenaar explain in their history of Himalayan mountaineering, the Workmans despised the local porters but were forced to recruit them; "their otherwise invaluable books read like one long, anguished harangue against the lazy, lying, thieving, mutinous cheats on whom they unhappily depended for local support".

They planned a sequence of four camps from 17,657 to 21,000 feet (5,382 to 6,401 m). Despite labor problems, the Workmans spent the night higher than any previous mountaineers —20,278 feet (6,181 m) on top of Z1 on Nun Kun—at what they called "Camp America".

William wrote of Fanny:

She concentrated her attention on the end in view, often disregarding the difficulties and even the dangers that might lie in the way of accomplishment. She went forward with a determination to succeed and a courage that won success where a less determined effort would have failed. She believed in taking advantage of every opportunity. She was no quitter, and was never the first to suggest turning back in the face of discouraging circumstances.

The map the Workmans made during this trip was of low quality. According to Mason, the couple did not have a good sense of topographical direction, which meant that their measurements were inaccurate and unusable by the Survey of India.

=== Pinnacle Peak and altitude record ===
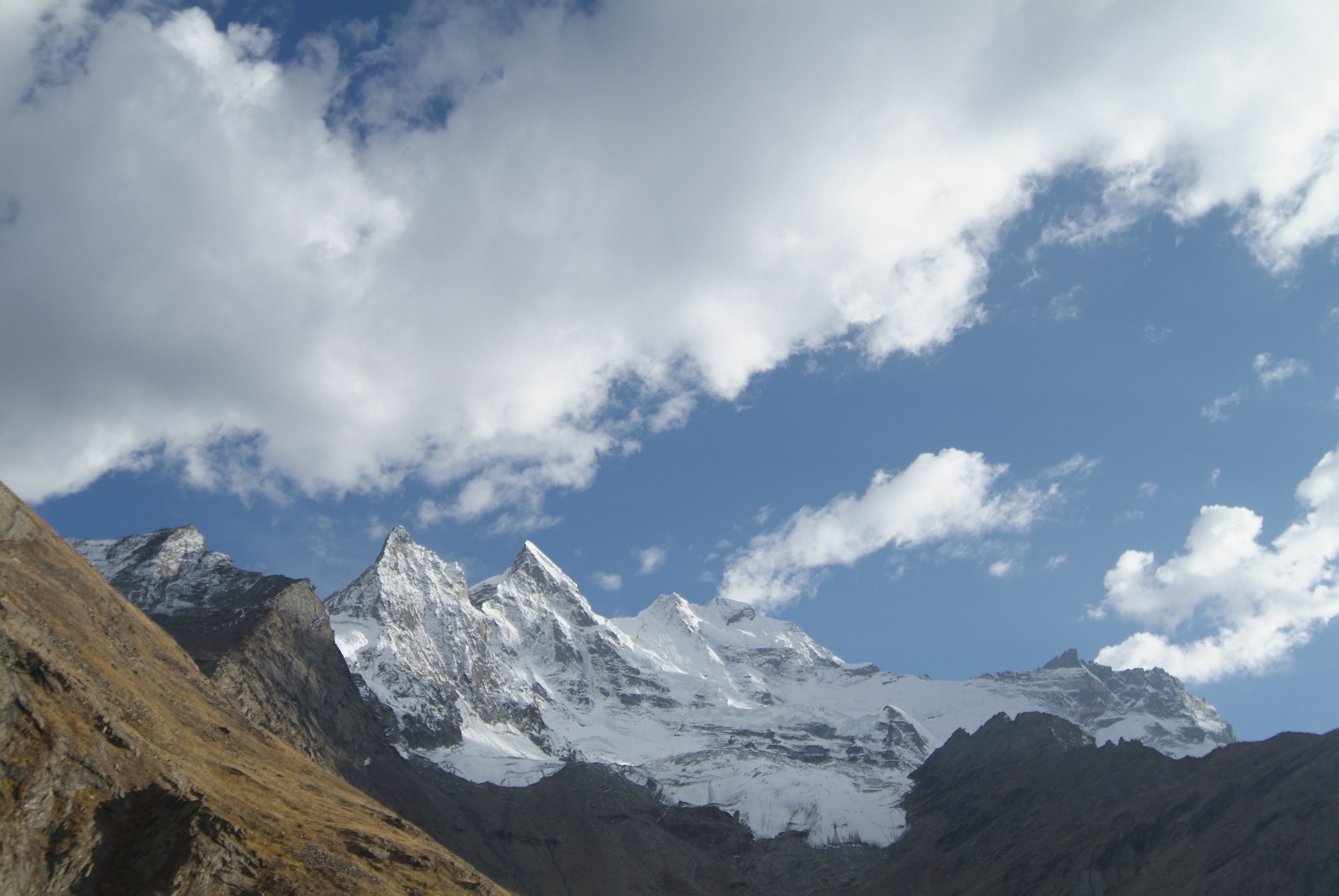
Mount Kun (center) and Pinnacle Peak (left) from the Suru Valley

From 20,278 feet (6,181 m), at the age of 47 in 1906, Workman climbed up to Pinnacle Peak (22,735 feet or 6,930 metres) (which she believed to be 23,263 feet or 7,091 metres), a subsidiary peak in the Nun Kun massif of the western Himalaya. It was her greatest mountaineering achievement.

She set an altitude record for women that would stand until Hetti Dhyrenfurth's 1934 ascent of Sia Kangri C (23,861 feet or 7,273 metres). Believing that they had both climbed above the 23,000-foot (7,000 m) mark, Fanny and William now considered themselves the leading experts on climbing at altitude.

As Isserman, Weaver and Molenaar point out, the fact that she "climbed the mountain at all, without benefit of modern equipment and encumbered by her voluminous skirts, speaks to both her ability and resolve".

Workman vigorously defended her Pinnacle Peak altitude record against all other claimants, especially Annie Smith Peck. In 1908, Peck claimed a new record with her climb of Peru's Huascarán, which she believed to be 23,000 feet (7,000 m). However, she was misinformed as to the peak's height and exaggerated distances she could not measure.

Workman was so competitive that she paid a team of French surveyors from the Service Géographique de l'Armée US$13,000 to measure the elevation of the mountain, which was actually 22,205 feet (6,768 m), confirming her record. She also kept meticulous records in order to prove her accomplishments. Pauly explains, "Ironically, her determination to prove herself the equal of any man at lofty elevations culminated with a withering attack on an American woman who tried to surpass her". Pauly concludes, "If Fanny Workman ever receives the recognition she deserves for her feminist determination to excel at this then-male sport, she will surely be remembered as much for her insistence upon accurate record-keeping as for the elevations she achieved."

=== Hispar and Siachen glaciers ===
In 1908, the Workmans returned to the Karakoram and explored the 38-mile-long (61 km) Hispar Glacier in the Hunza Nagar region; they went from Gilgit to Nagir over the Hispar Pass (17,500 feet or 5,300 metres) and onto the 37-mile-long (60 km) Biafo Glacier to Askole. Their total traverse of the glaciers was another record, and Fanny became the first woman to travel across any Himalayan glacier of this size.

They were the first to explore its many side glaciers and the maps created by their Italian porters helped map the region for the first time. They recorded the physiological effects of high altitude, studied glaciers and ice pinnacles, and took meteorological measurements, including altitude data recorded with both aneroid barometers and boiling point thermometers.

The Workmans' exploration of the Rose Glacier and the 45-mile-long (72 km) Siachen Glacier in Baltistan around Masherbrum in 1911 and 1912 was the most important achievement of their careers because it was the widest and longest subpolar glacier in the world and at the time, the least explored and accessible glacier as well.

For two months, the Workmans explored the 45-mile glacier, climbed several mountains, and mapped the area. They spent the entire time over 15,000 feet (4,600 m), the high point being Indira Col, which they summitted and named.

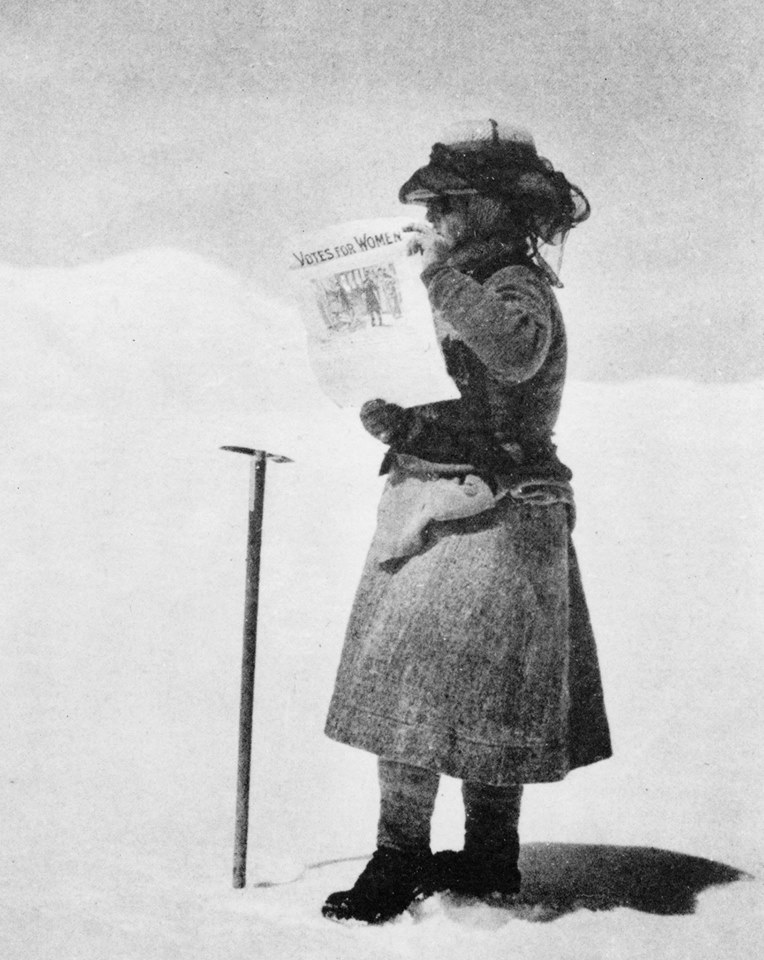
Workman on the Silver Throne Plateau holding up a newspaper that reads "Votes for Women"

On this expedition, one of their Italian guides fell into a crevasse and died; Fanny was lucky to escape. The others were badly shaken but decided to carry on. Fanny led them across the Sia La pass (18,700 feet or 5,700 metres) near the head of the Siachen Glacier and through a previously unexplored region to the Kaberi Glacier.

They took trained Alpine guides and surveyors including Grant Peterkin and Surjan Singh, whose contributions ensured that, unlike numerous other maps the Workmans helped create, their map of the Siachen Glacier remained unchallenged for many years.

This exploration and the resulting book were among her greatest accomplishments. As she wrote in her book about the trip, Two Summers in the Ice-Wilds of Eastern Karakoram, she organized and led this expedition: "Dr. Hunter Workman accompanied me, this time, in charge with me of commissariat and as photographer and glacialist, but I was the responsible leader of this expedition, and on my efforts, in a large measure, must depend the success or failure of it".

At one 21,000-foot (6,400 m) plateau, Fanny unfurled a "Votes for Women" newspaper and her husband snapped an iconic picture.

== Later life and death ==
After returning from their travels, the Workmans lectured all over Europe. Fanny lectured in English, German, or French, as the occasion required. At one talk in Lyon, France, 1000 people crowded into the auditorium and 700 were turned away. In 1905 Fanny became the second woman to address the Royal Geographical Society. (Isabella Bird Bishop had been the first in May 1897.) Her talk was mentioned in The Times.

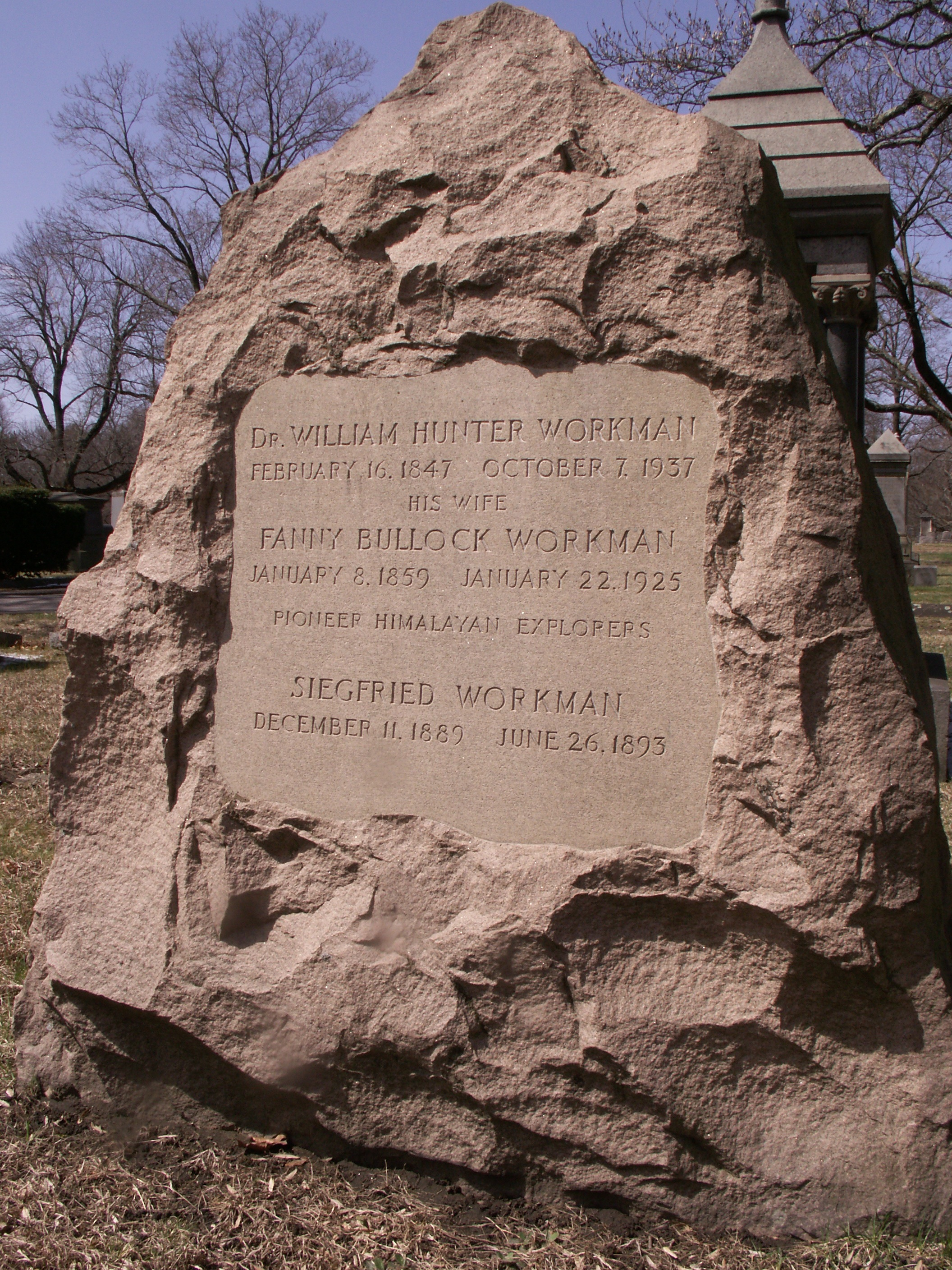
Monument dedicated to Fanny Bullock Workman, Rural Cemetery, Worcester, Massachusetts (Plot 1500 Sec. 31)

After their 1908–12 trip, the couple stopped exploring and turned to writing and lecturing, primarily because of the onset of World War I in 1914. Workman became the first American woman to lecture at the Sorbonne in Paris. She was also one of the first women admitted as a member of the Royal Geographical Society, a distinction she earned because her publications included scientific reflections on glaciation and other phenomena.

She also earned medals of honor from 10 European geographical societies and was eventually elected a member of the American Alpine Club, Royal Asiatic Society, Club Alpino Italiano, Deutscher und Österreichischer Alpenverein, and Club alpin français. She was very proud of these achievements, listing them on the title pages of her books.

== Legacy ==
=== Death and bequests ===
Workman fell ill in 1917 and died after a long illness in 1925 in Cannes, France. Her ashes were buried in Massachusetts, and are now reinterred along with her husband's, under a monument in Worcester, Massachusetts' Rural Cemetery that reads "Pioneer Himalayan Explorers".

In her will, she left $125,000 to four women's colleges, Radcliffe, Wellesley, Smith, and Bryn Mawr; the bequests were demonstrative of her long-lasting interest in the advancement of women's rights, and her belief that women were the equals of men.

As a result of the money Workman left in her will, Wellesley College offers a $16,000 fellowship named after Fanny Workman for graduate study in any discipline to a Wellesley graduate each year. Bryn Mawr established a Fanny Bullock Workman Traveling Fellowship, which is awarded to Ph.D. candidates in Archaeology or Art History when funds permit.

The object of placing my full name in connection with the [Siachen Glacier] expedition ... is not because I wish in any way to thrust myself forward, but solely that in the accomplishments of women, now and in the future, it should be known to them and stated in print that a woman was the initiator and special leader of this expedition. When, later, woman occupies her acknowledged position as an individual worker in all fields, as well as those of exploration, no such emphasis of her work will be needed; but that day has not fully arrived, and at present it behooves women, for the benefit of their sex, to put what they do, at least, on record.

— Fanny Workman, Two Summers in the Ice-Wilds of Eastern Karakoram

=== Women in climbing ===
Along with Annie Smith Peck, Workman was recognized during the early 20th century as one of the most famous female climbers in the world. Their rivalry demonstrated that women could climb the most remote and difficult terrain on the planet.

Women had climbed regularly in the Alps since the 1850s, but in the Himalayas, mountaineering had been dominated by wealthy English men. No other women, however, climbed in the Himalaya until well after World War I, by which time improvements in equipment and organization had shifted that nature of risks and difficulties of expeditions.

Workman, herself an ardent feminist and a supporter of women's suffrage, wanted her readers to understand how her contributions and achievements reflected all women's potential. In her writings, Workman described herself as "questioning or violating the norms of Victorian female propriety".

She demonstrated that women were strong enough to thrive outside the home by showing how easy it was for her to endure strenuous physical activities like bicycling long distances in hot, humid places or mountaineering in cold temperatures and high altitudes.

Workman challenged a masculine realm; her obituary in the Alpine Journal alluded to the challenges she faced, saying that she "felt that she suffered from 'sex antagonism'". The author of the piece added: "it is possible that some unconscious feeling let us say of the novelty of a woman's intrusion into the domain of exploration so long reserved to man, may in some quarters have existed ... there tended to arise ... an atmosphere shall we say of aloofness?"

However, in her study of Victorian mountaineering, Ann Colley suggests that gender discrimination was more overt at lower elevations and in regular life than at higher elevations, such as in the Himalaya. Colley states, "Away from such petty opinion emanating from society pressures, up high, above the snow line or in distant regions, women climbers could more fully experience equality and power ... If they chose, they could be just as sportsmanlike or competitive as the men."

In her entry about Workman in the Dictionary of Literary Biography, Tingley sums Workman up as "an aggressive, determined, and uncompromising turn-of-the-century American woman traveler" and "one of the first women to work as a professional mountaineer and surveyor and to write about the expeditions she and her husband took to the most remote reaches of the Himalaya. She was an outspoken advocate of woman's suffrage and made it clear that she considered herself to be a role model for other women travelers and mountaineers."

=== Historical assessment of Himalayan exploration ===
The many books and articles produced by the Workmans are "still useful" according to Mason, especially for their photographs and illustrations, but their maps are "deceptive and not always reliable". One assessment states that although the Workmans excelled at describing meteorological conditions, glaciology, and how high altitudes affected human health and fitness, they were poor topographers.

The Workmans were some of the first mountaineers to grasp that the Himalaya were the place for the ultimate climbing challenge and their explorations helped evolve mountaineering from strenuous recreation into a serious, regulated competitive sport.

According to Isserman, Weaver and Molenaar, "that the Workmans were intrepid explorers and climbers none could possibly doubt, but they were also aggressive self-promoters who in their eagerness for recognition and honors sometimes exaggerated the originality and significance of what they had done."

In their final assessment, Isserman, Weaver and Molenaar say "they had logged more miles and climbed more peaks than anyone to date; they had produced five sumptuously illustrated and widely read expedition volumes; and by simple virtue of her sex Fanny of course had set an invaluable Himalayan precedent. But the Workmans were not great mountaineers. At their best they were vigorous and competent patrons who followed capably in the hard-won steps of their Italian guides."

However, in his chapter on Workman, Pauly writes that "the few recent accounts of Fanny Workman have tended to slight or belittle her achievements, but contemporaries, unaware of the far greater accomplishments to come, held the Workmans in high regard."

They were the first Americans to explore the Himalaya in depth and break the British monopoly over Himalayan mountaineering.

== Bibliography ==
=== Books ===
- Algerian memories : a bicycle tour over the Atlas to the Sahara. London: T.F. Unwin. 1895. p. 216.
- Sketches awheel in modern Iberia. London: Unwin. 1897. p. 280.
- In the ice world of Himálaya, among the peaks and passes of Ladakh, Nubra, Suru, and Baltistan. New York: Cassell & Company, Limited. 1900. p. 204.
- Ice-Bound Heights of the Mustagh: An Account of Two seasons of Pioneer Exploration and High Climbing in the Baltistan Himalaya. London: A. Constable & Co. 1908. p. 444.
- Peaks and Glaciers of Nun Kun: A Record of Pioneer-Exploration and Mountaineering in the Punjab Himalaya. London: Constable and Company Ltd. 1909. p. 411.
- The Call of the Snowy Hispar: A Narrative of Exploration and Mountaineering on the Northern Frontier of India. New York: Scribner. 1911. p. 520.
- Two Summers in the Ice-Wilds of Eastern Karakoram: The Exploration of Nineteen Hundred Square Miles of Mountain and Glacier. New York: E. P. Dutton & Company. 1916. p. 578.

=== Articles ===
- "Among the Great Himalayan Glaciers." National Geographic 13 (Nov. 1920): 405–406.
- "First Ascents of the Hoh Lumba and the Sosbon Glaciers in the Northwest Himalayas." Independent 55 (December 31, 1903): 3108–12.
- Through Town and Jungle: Fourteen Thousand Miles A-Wheel Among the Temples and People of the Indian Plain. London: Unwin, 1904.
- "Miss Peck and Mrs. Workman." Scientific American 102 (Feb 12 and April 16, 1910); 143, 319.
- "Recent First Ascents in the Himalaya." Independent 68 (June 2, 1910): 1202–10.
- "Conquering the Great Rose." Harper 129 (June 1914): 44–45.
- "Exploring the Rose." Independent 85 (January 10, 1916): 54–56.
- "Four Miles High." Independent 86 (June 5, 1916): 377–378.

== See also ==
- List of climbers and mountaineers
