= KHUN =

DKHUN
Huntington, Utah; United States
- Frequency: 107.1 MHz

Programming
- Format: Defunct

Ownership
- Owner: College Creek Media, LLC

History
- Call sign meaning: HUNtington

Technical information
- Licensing authority: FCC
- Facility ID: 164146
- Class: C3
- ERP: 360 watts
- HAAT: 529 meters (1,736 ft)
- Transmitter coordinates: 39°12′28″N 111°8′32″W

Links
- Public license information: Public file; LMS

KHUN (107.1 FM) was a radio station licensed to Huntington, Utah, United States. The station was owned by College Creek Media, LLC.

On September 30, 2013, the Federal Communications Commission (FCC) notified the licensee that KHUN's license had expired effective July 6, 2012, as the station had been silent for the preceding twelve months. The FCC simultaneously deleted the KHUN call sign from its data base.
