= GunZ 2 =

GunZ 2: The Second Duel
- Developer: MAIET Entertainment
- Publishers: MAIET Entertainment: EU: ProSiebenSat.1 Media; TH: INI3
- Engine: Realspace v3
- Platform: Microsoft Windows
- Release: 2011 (Korea Beta): EU: December 2013; NA: 17 February 2014
- Genre: Third-person shooter
- Mode: Online multiplayer

GunZ: The Second Duel (or simply GunZ 2) is an online third-person shooting game created by South Korean-based MAIET Entertainment. It is the sequel to 2003's GunZ: The Duel. Gunz 2 began its first closed beta test in Korea in early 2011, however it has yet to be released. Gunz 2 is currently greenlit on Steam via its Greenlight program, and has entered into beta testing on February 17, 2014 via Steam Greenlight. The Steam version of Gunz 2 is available for international players, mainly in North America. The European version of Gunz 2 was hosted during its open beta phase by ProSiebenSat.1 Media. On 15 December 2014, the licensing agreement between MAIET Entertainment and Prosieben ended where MAIET opened a Steam server for the European region.

On September 4, 2015, a news post on Steam announced that the company MAIET Entertainment is no longer operational. The post also states that all rights for the game were taken over by the company MasangSoft Inc. This sparked anger among the game's fanbase due to the lack of communication from either company.

On March 31, 2017, MasangSoft announced all servers for GunZ 2 except US-West will close on May 10, 2017 at 5:00 PM PST. They cite accumulated deficit as a reason for the closures.

== Gameplay ==
GunZ 2: The Second Duel is a multiplayer third-person shooter mixed with swordplay, similar to the first game GunZ: The Duel. The game emphasizes fast-paced gameplay and advanced free-movement mechanics such as dashing, wall-running and tumbling. The players can split into two teams, either GSF or NAU. There are six different classes to choose from (Ivan, Elena, Rena, Max, Wayne, and Rose), all with different sets of skills and play styles.

The advanced movement mechanics allows the player to maneuver in unique ways and create deadly combat techniques using rhythmic keystrokes. The game's advanced combat system is very similar but arguably not as exploitable as its prequel.

GunZ 2's network communication is solved by player hosted servers, when the players joins the game one of the players will be assigned the role to act as a hosting machine. MAIET released a dedicated server solution to the US West region for testing purposes and declaring to expand later to other regions when it's stable. The dedicated server was later removed from the game.

The game offers different game modes to play:

- Deathmatch
- Team Deathmatch
- Team Elimination Players will each round spawn simultaneously and killed players will become spectator for the rest of the round. The team that successfully kills everyone in the other team will win the round.
- Campaign A Story mode for Gunz2, where you can play together in co-op mode to defeat NPCs enemies and complete missions.

== Storyline ==
Continent of Astra, 1863 AD. During the war between the Axium Empire and Republic of Trivia, Mankind makes one of the greatest discoveries of its history, Optimite. At the same time, Adam Corp, a supranational mega corporation was founded with its basis in energy industry. Adam Corp rapidly expanded with its enormous capital and became the third power of the world along with the empire and republic. Adam Corp is a group of brutal capitalists who do not hesitate to victimize anyone who stands in their way. The bigger they have become, the more devastated the public have become. To stand against the super villain, people of Astra have formed a vigilante group called Guardian Sans Frontier, the GSF.

1970 AD, Today. After the cold war, Adam Corp has completed their armament expansion and began manufacturing combat robots, which was prohibited by the international law. GSF quickly picked up the intel and dispatched their agents to an island in the republic where the core facilities of Adam Corp’s military factories are located. Hence begins the battle of GSF to cease Adam Corp’s bold ambition to take over the world.

Though never explicitly mentioned, it is suggested that the universes of GunZ 1 & 2 are indeed connected. Although GunZ 1's lore isn't as expansive, GunZ 2 has the same mansion map from GunZ 1, which features the statue of Ryswick the Great. One of the songs of GunZ 1's OST is named Ryswick style, likely a reference to the statue of the same name.

== Development and release ==
The game was initially announced in 2010. It expanded to have a second server in Taiwan in May 2011. A closed beta took place in August 2012. It sought Greenlight in March 2013. On March 25, 2013 in mere months before the cancellation of the first game by Aeria (who bought out rights owner Ijji in 2012) it was announced that the English version of the game would be distributed via Steam, and was registered on Steam that day. It was greenlit for a wider international release on June 13. On March 29, it expanded to include Australia, New Zealand and the Middle East. On April 3 it expanded again to include Asia, Europe and the United States.

By April 4, after only 10 days on Steam, the greenlight project made the top 100. It climbed to the top 50 by April 18, the top 30 by April 29, and the top 15 by May 23.

On May 7 a member of the Gunz 2 North America team was interviewed about the game, where they clarified that those who joined the Steam group would get invites to the beta test of the game. On June 3, a press release from ProSiebenSat.1 Games revealed that they will publish the European version of the game, scheduled to be released in winter of 2013. MAIET also gained a Taiwanese publisher in Wasabii. On June 13, Gunz 2 received Greenlight approval from Steam, meaning that the English version for North America would moving forward, followed by the South American version.

On August 21, MAIET announced that closed beta testing had begun in Europe and Taiwan, while the open beta test was scheduled to occur in December. They also confirmed that it would be available with English and Korean voices while other language options would be available in Portuguese and Spanish. On December 15 they announced those releases would be pushed back to early 2014 and later clarified that it was scheduled for January, then it was pushed to February.

On September 4, 2015, Masangsoft made an official, public announcement that a new company has taken over the game. Since that announcement, with the exception of maintenance and system recovery notices, Masangsoft has not informed the public of any further development.
