= Jiang Kun =

Jiang Kun may refer to:

- Jiang Kun (comedian) (born 1950), Chinese comedian
- Jiang Kun (footballer) (born 1979), Chinese footballer
