= Nun Kun =

Mountain in Jammu and Kashmir, India

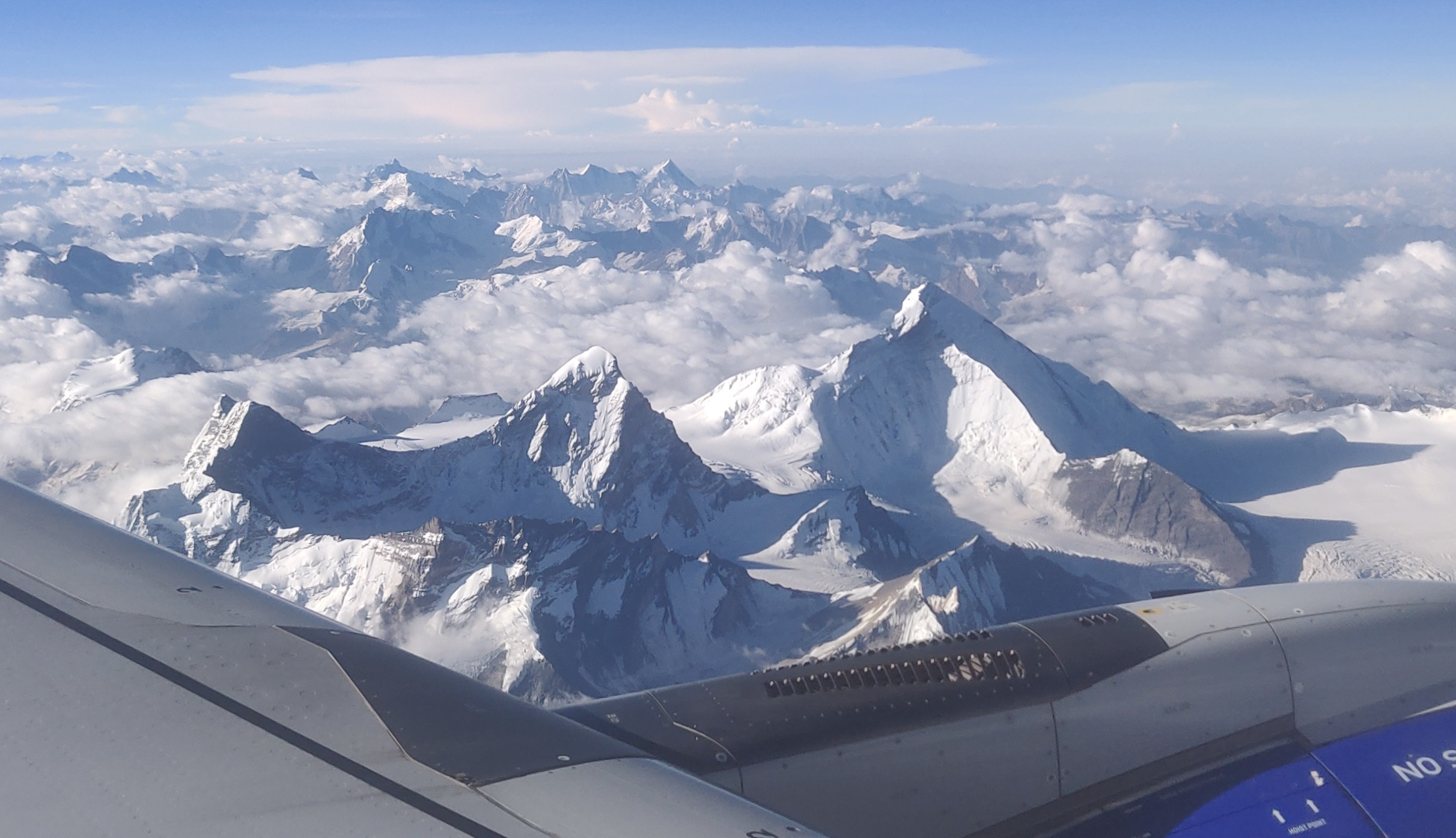
- Pinnacle, Kun and Nun Peaks (from left to right)

Highest point
- Elevation: 7,135 m (23,409 ft)
- Prominence: 2,404 m (7,887 ft)
- Listing: Ultras in the Himalayas; List of Indian states and territories by highest point
- Coordinates: 33°58′48″N 76°01′18″E

Geography
- Location within Jammu and Kashmir
- Location: Jammu and Kashmir, India (Note: This region is disputed and controlled by India; the whole region is claimed by Pakistan. See e.g. The Future of Kashmir on the BBC website.)
- Parent range: Himalayas

Climbing
- First ascent: 28 August 1953 by Pierre Vittoz, Claude Kogan
- Easiest route: West Ridge: glacier/snow/ice climb

Nun Kun is a mountain massif of the greater Himalayan range, located on the border of Jammu and Kashmir and Ladakh in northern India. It consists of two main peaks: Nun (7,135 m (23,409 feet)) and Kun (7,077 m (23,219 feet)), (Note: Figures for Kun's elevation vary between 7,035 m and 7,086 m.) separated from each other by a 4 km long snowy plateau, with a third peak of the massif, known as Pinnacle Peak (6,930 m (22,740 feet)), lying at its eastern end. Nun is the tallest peak of Jammu and Kashmir, while its sister peak Kun lies in Ladakh. It is about 250 km (160 mi) east of Srinagar. The Nun Kun massif is bounded to the north by the Suru valley and the Zanskar range, flanked to the east by the Pensi La (4400 m), which separates the Suru and Zanskar Valleys, while the Kishtwar National Park and the Krash Nai river lie to its south. The rocks predominantly are stratified sedimentary rocks composed of shale and sandstone. Metamorphic rocks and granite formations are also seen at places. The area is rich in minerals, especially garnets.

== Mountaineering ==
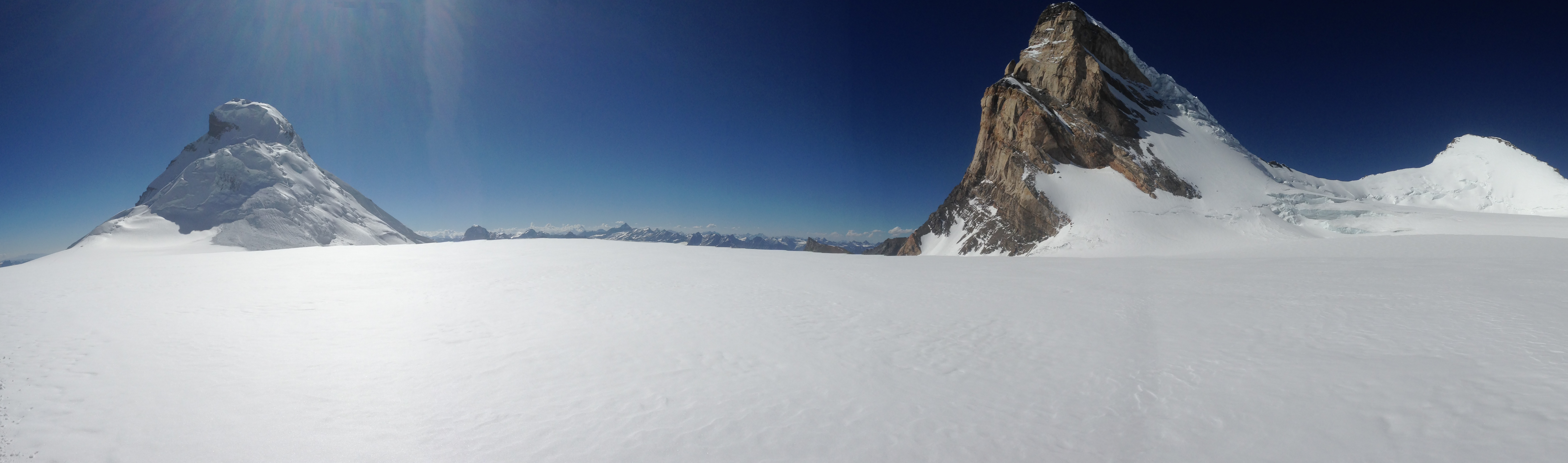
Nun-left, Kun-right

Early exploration of the massif included a visit in 1898 and three visits by Arthur Neve, in 1902, 1904, and 1910. In 1903, Dutch mountaineer H. Sillem investigated the massif and discovered the high plateau between the peaks; he reached an altitude of 6,400 m (21,000 ft) on Nun. In 1906, noted explorer couple Fanny Bullock Workman and her husband William Hunter Workman claimed an ascent of Pinnacle Peak. They also toured extensively through the massif and produced a map; however, controversy surrounded the Workmans' claims, and few trigonometrical points were given for the region, so that the map they produced was not usable.

After unsuccessful attempts to climb the mountain in 1934, 1937, and 1946 the first ascent of Nun was in 1953 by a French-Swiss-Indian-Sherpa team led by Bernard Pierre and Pierre Vittoz, via the west ridge. The summit pair comprised Vittoz, a Moravian missionary to the Tibetans and an experienced alpinist, and Claude Kogan, a pioneering female mountaineer. Since then, other routes have been pioneered. The north-west face was first ascended on 27 October and 28, 1976 by seven climbers from a Czech expedition, led by F. Čejka. The first British ascent was made by Steve Berry and friends via the east ridge in 1981 (his father had attempted Nun in 1946).

Italian mountaineer Mario Piacenza made the first ascent of Kun in 1913, via the north-east ridge. Fifty-eight years passed before the second recorded attempt on the peak, which resulted in a successful ascent by an expedition from the Indian Army.

A comprehensive geographic and topographical description along with a history of climbing Mt Nun can be found in the 2018 issue of the Himalayan Journal. On 20 August 2022 an IAF operation was held to rescue an Italian mountaineer. The district administration of Kargil deputed a special team to shaped to treat the mountaineer who had suffered acute mountain sickness at a high altitude.

The massif is most conveniently accessed from the road connecting Kargil and Leh. The roadhead from the West is Tangol, approximately a two hour drive from Kargil. The route goes through the villages of Sankoo and Panikhar.

The mountain has the North ridge, the longest that splits into North West and North East ridge at around 500m below the summit. the Northwest Ridge splits the Kangriz Glacier into West and East. The South ridge drops from the mountain after 500m giving way to the formidable South wall. The West ridge, is more direct and accessible by climbing the snow wall on the West face. This is reached by traversing the snow field of the Kangriz glacier after climbing the ice wall of the Kangriz Glacier West reached from the base camp (4600m) typically established in the upper Sentik Valley.

== See also ==
- List of ultras of the Himalayas
