= Şen =

Şen is a Turkish surname. The meaning of the word is very happy and lively.

== Notable people ==
- Ali Şen, Turkish actor
- Eren Şen, German-Turkish footballer
- Ersan Şen (born 1966), Turkish lawyer and academic
- Gülhan Şen, Turkish television presenter, producer, and speaker
- H. Nida Sen, Turkish ophthalmologist
- Şener Şen, Turkish actor
- Volkan Şen, Turkish footballer

== See also ==
- Sen (surname)
- Şengün
