= Alice Gun =

English musician

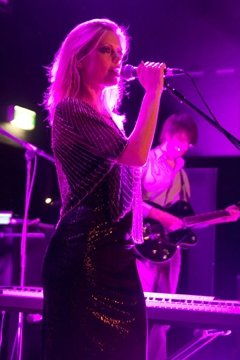
- Alice Gun performing at the Natural History Museum as part of the Exhibition Road Festival, 21 June 2009

Background information
- Born: Kentish Town, London, England
- Genres: Dark rural spooky romantic pop
- Occupations: Singer, songwriter
- Instruments: Vocals, guitar, cello, piano, accordion
- Years active: 2009–present
- Label: Ambiguous Records
- Website: Alice Gun official website

Alice Gun is an English musician who plays in the band of the same name. Her debut album, Blood & Bone, was released digitally on 21 March 2011 and physically on 4 April 2011 through Ambiguous Records, following the critically acclaimed singles The Swimmer and Metal Spider. She is the former lead singer and guitarist in Alice & The Enemies and Sunset Gun.

== Music ==
Alice Gun records at her home in Kentish Town, north London, and in an isolated Lakeland farmhouse, making music from cello, guitars, glockenspiel, double bass, E-bow, accordion and upright piano. A classically trained multi-instrumentalist, she also plays cello for blues man Mr. David Viner in a long-running collaboration which has included recording with Ed Harcourt and touring with The White Stripes. She also does house music vocals, but insists this is "for the money".

Alice Gun's band includes her producer and Damon Albarn-collaborator Al Mobbs, Robbie Jarvis on drums and Sam Campari. Campari also designs the sleeves to her physical releases.

Her music has been described as "beautiful and profoundly affecting" by BBC 6 Music presenter Tom Robinson, and compared to PJ Harvey, Regina Spektor and Bat For Lashes.

== Discography ==
=== Studio albums ===
- Blood & Bone (2011)

=== EPs ===
- The Swimmer b/w Minty Fresh (7" & download) (2009)
- Metal Spider b/w Love Song (download only) (2011)
- Not Made For This World b/w Metal Spider (Campari Remix, pts I, II and III) (download only) (2011)

=== Remixes ===
- The Swimmer (Campari rmx) (download only) (2009)
- Minty Fresh (Campari rmx) (download only) (2009)
- Metal Spider (Campari Remix, pts I, II and III) (download only) (2011)
