= Gun Lund =

Swedish choreographer and dancer (born 1943)

Gun Lund (born 1943) is a choreographer and dancer based in Gothenburg, Sweden. She is one of the pioneers of Swedish contemporary dance, and has produced and performed over fifty original works since 1978. In 1987, she established the Atalante dance theatre, together with two other choreographers, Eva Ingemarsson and Gunilla Witt.

Gun Lund is the director of the dance company E=mc2 Dance, where she has made productions combining dance with natural sciences. She holds a master's degree in art and technology at Chalmers Institute of Technology in Gothenburg. She is also the initiator and artistic director of 24kvadrat, a venue with a scene 24 square metres (approximately 258.3 square feet) large, and seating for an audience of 15 people. She has been involved in the international project Dance Across Borders for several years.

In 2005, Gun Lund was awarded the Dance Prize of Swedish Theatre Critics.
