= Pinnacle Peak (Ladakh) =

Mountain in India

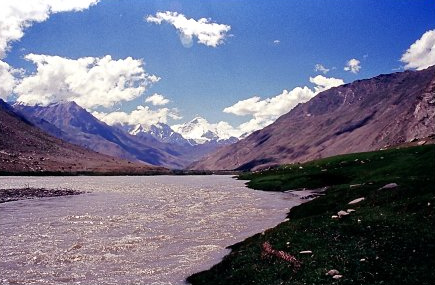
- Nun, Kun and Pinnacle in the distance

Highest point
- Elevation: 6,930 m (22,740 ft)
- Prominence: 470 m (1,540 ft)
- Listing: Ultra
- Coordinates: 34°1′16.57″N 76°4′50.34″E

Geography
- Location within Ladakh Location within India
- Location: Suru Valley, Kargil, Ladakh, India
- Parent range: Himalaya

Climbing
- First ascent: 1906 by Fanny Bullock Workman (U.S.)
- Easiest route: West Ridge: glacier/snow/ice climb

The Pinnacle Peak is a part and third highest summit with elevation 22,740 ft (6,930 metres) of the Nun Kun mountain massif of the western Himalayan Range, located near the Suru valley, on Kargil Zanskar road 80 kilometers west of Kargil town.

The Pinnacle Peak is located north-east of Nun 23,409 ft (7,135 metres) which is the highest summit of the massif and is separated from it by a snowy plateau of 4 km in length, between them rises another peak Kun 23,219 ft (7,077 metres).

== Mountaineering ==
Early exploration of the massif included a visit in 1898 and three visits by Arthur Neve, in 1902, 1904, and 1910. In 1903, Dutch mountaineer Dr. H. Sillem investigated the massif and discovered the high plateau between the peaks; he reached an altitude of 6,400 m (21,000 ft) on Nun. In 1906, the Pinnacle Peak was first ascended by a noted explorer couple Fanny Bullock Workman and her husband William Hunter Workman, a women's altitude record at the time. They also toured extensively through the massif and produced a map; however, controversy surrounded the Workmans' claims, and few trigonometrical points were given for the region, so that the map they produced was not usable.

The massif is accessed by 210 kilometers by road from Srinagar NH 1D up to Kargil and then 80 kilometers via Kargil Zanskar road.
