= Gün =

- Sunset in Istanbul. The name Gün comes from the Turkish word for "sun" or "day."
- Gender: Masculine
- Language: Turkish

Origin
- Meaning: "sun" or "day"

Gün is a Turkish masculine given name and surname derived from the Turkish word for 'sun' or 'day.'

== Given name ==
=== First name ===
- Gün Sazak (1932–1980), Turkish politician
- Gün Temür Khan (1384–1402), Mongol Khagan of the Northern Yuan Dynasty

=== Middle name ===
- Emin Gün Sirer, Turkish-American computer scientist

== Surname ==
- Bediha Gün (born 1994), Turkish wrestler

== See also ==
- Şengün
