= Ladies' Scottish Climbing Club =

Mountaineering association

The club meeting at the start of 1909. Founder Lucy Smith is leftmost while Jane Inglis Clark is in the centre of the doorway.

Lucy Smith and Pauline Ranken climbing the Salisbury Crags in 1908.

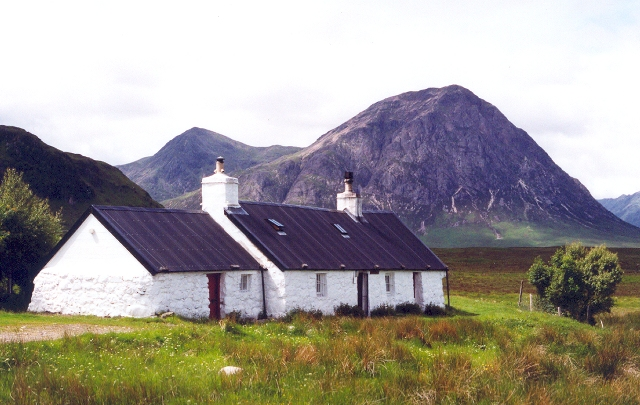
Blackrock Cottage is the club's climbing hut near Glencoe. The mountain in the background is the Beuckle. This was one of the first mountains climbed by the club and a party was held on the summit to celebrate the club's centenary.

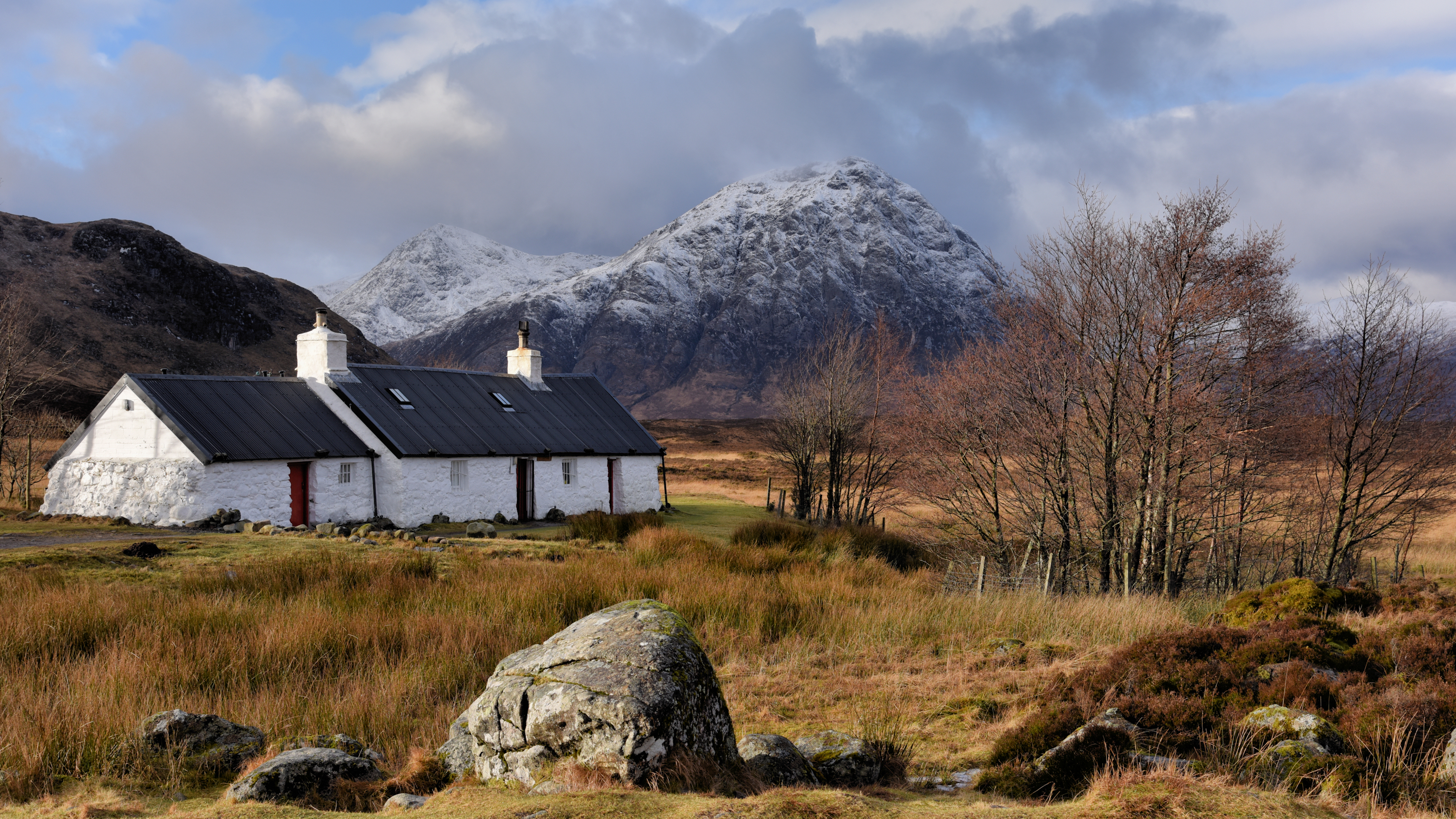
Another view of Blackrock Cottage on Rannoch Moor

The Ladies' Scottish Climbing Club was founded by Jane Inglis Clark, her daughter Mabel, and Lucy Smith at a boulder near Lix Toll, Perthshire in 1908. It now has about 120 members and is the oldest active climbing club exclusively for women. The club has sent numerous expeditions abroad and made the first all-woman climb of a major peak in the Himalayas.

== Founding ==
The club was founded by three experienced climbers: Jane Inglis Clark, her daughter Mabel, and Lucy Smith. Miss Smith was the daughter of a president of the Scottish Mountaineering Club and Mrs Inglis Clark's husband William Inglis Clark was secretary, but as women they were not allowed to join the all-male club. The Ladies' Alpine Club had been formed in London in 1907 and so, while sheltering by a large boulder at Lix Toll on 18 April 1908, the three decided to form a similar club in Scotland. A committee meeting was held in May which established the club's constitution and purpose: "to bring together Ladies who are lovers of mountain-climbing, and to encourage mountaineering in Scotland, in winter as well as in summer." The first president of the club was Mrs Inglis Clark while Lucy Smith was treasurer, Miss Inglis Clark was secretary, and Ruth Raeburn the librarian.

== Development ==
In its first year, the club had fourteen members. Its equipment included alpine rope which had been fixed to the Cobbler and the Salisbury Crags in Edinburgh where the members trained. To qualify, members had to ascend four peaks of at least 3,000 feet with two snow climbs and two rock climbs. They then went on bold climbs of mountains such as the Beuckle (Buachaille Etive Mòr) and Suilven. To be decent, they would start their climbs in long skirts but, when no men were around, would often discard these to climb in knickerbockers. They attracted climbers from Glasgow too and the total membership in the early years was about 70. In 1947, the club took a lease on its first climbing hut—Blackrock Cottage near Glencoe—and the second was added in 1963—Milehouse Cottage near Kincraig. From these and other bases, numerous Scottish mountains were climbed and member Annie Hirst was the first woman to climb all the Munros—the 282 Scottish peaks higher than 3,000 feet.

== Expeditions ==
In 1928, a club expedition to the Alps was organised. Subsequent expeditions were made to other climbing regions abroad such as the Caucasus and Yosemite. In 1955, the club made the first all-woman team expedition to the Himalayas, made up of Monica Jackson, Evelyn McNicol and Elizabeth Stark, where they were the first to climb a 22,000-foot peak in the Jugal Himal which they named Gyalgen Peak. Since then many club expeditions have been made including: Greenland in 1970 &1998, regular Alpine trips since the mid 1990's, the Himalayas in 2000 and Bolivia in 2008.

== Anniversaries ==
In 1958, the first secretary made a speech upon the club's 50th anniversary as its president. Mabel Jeffrey was now married and brought her grandchildren to the celebrations at the site of the club's founding at the boulder at Lix Toll.

In 2008, the centenary was celebrated with a party of the membership in period costume on top of the Beuckle. President Helen Steven recalled the youngest founder, "I knew Mabel and remember her as very warm, rosy-cheeked and welcoming – she came into a room like a burst of sunshine. But she was hard as old nails. They were all characters..." The Club returned to Lix Toll and the boulder now surrounded by trees to more celebrations.
