= Altitude record =

Altitude record may refer to:

- Flight altitude record, the highest altitude to have been reached in an aircraft
- World altitude record (mountaineering), the highest altitude to have been reached by mountaineers
