= Nepal Peak (Himalayas) =

Mountain in the Himalayas

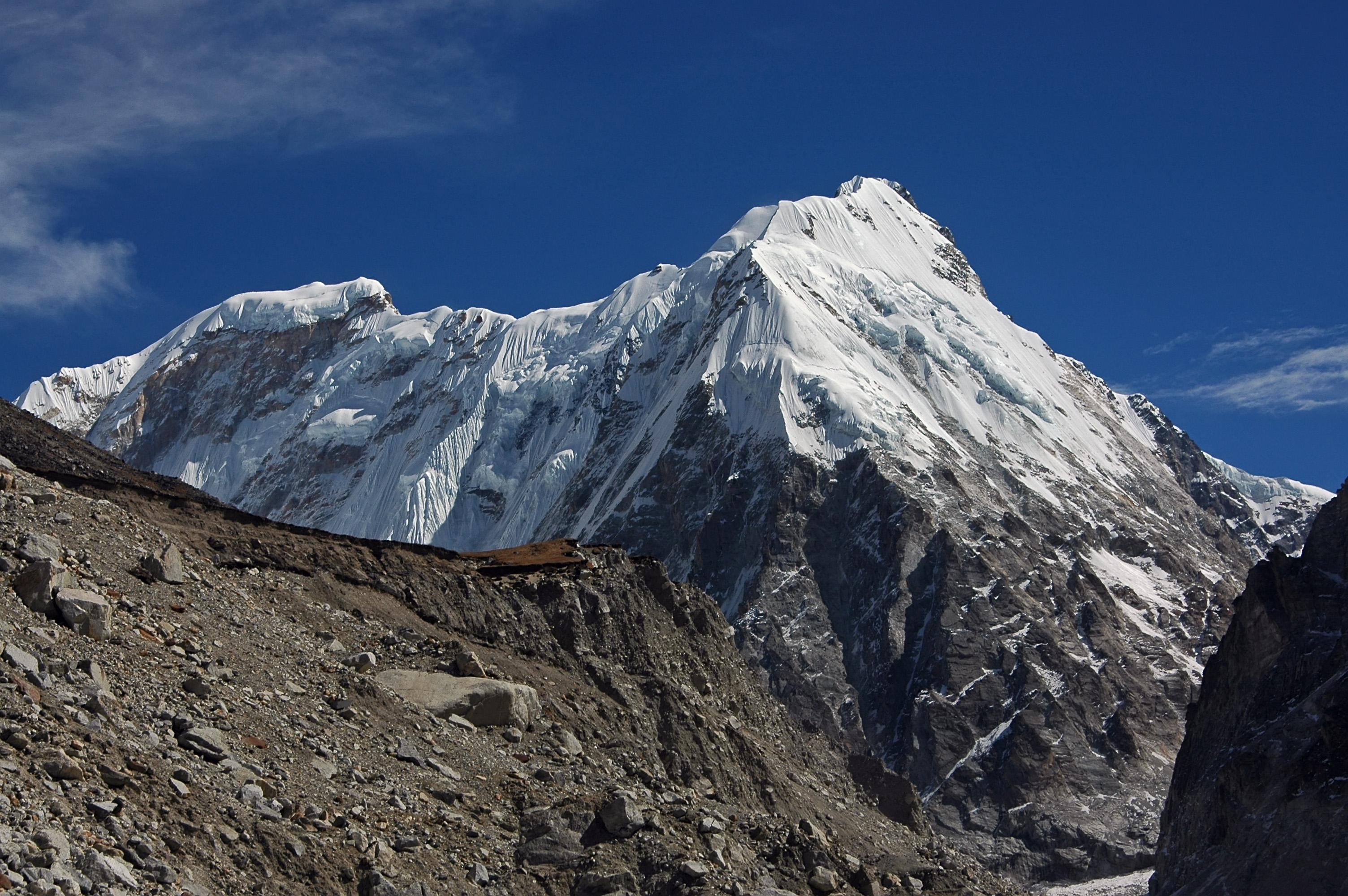
- Nepal Peak

Highest point
- Elevation: 7,177 m (23,547 ft)
- Prominence: 197 m (646 ft)
- Listing: Mountains of Nepal; Mountains of India
- Coordinates: 27°46′36″N 88°10′58″E

Geography
- Location within Koshi Province Location within Nepal Location within India
- Location: Nepal / Sikkim, India
- Parent range: Himalayas

Climbing
- First ascent: May 1930
- Easiest route: rock/snow/ice climb

Nepal Peak is a mountain in the Himalayas. It lies on the border between Nepal and India.

== Location ==
The peak is located at 7,177 m (23,547 ft) above sea level in the extreme northeast of Nepal and northwest of Sikkim. It is approximately 2km southwest of Kirat Chuli. Climbers ascending Kirat Chuli from the Nepal Gap, by the southwest ridge, usually traverse the summit of Nepal Peak.

== Climbing history ==
The first ascent was made in late May 1930 by Erwin Schneider, a member of an international expedition which included climbers from Germany, Austria, Switzerland and the UK and was led by Günter Dyhrenfurth. Schneider ascended Nepal Peak by himself.

Until Schneider went on to make the first ascent of Jongsong Peak just a few days later on 2 June 1930, Nepal Peak was the highest summit reached in the world.
