= Jane Inglis Clark =

Scottish mountaineer and rock climber

Jane Inglis Clark (centre of the doorway) with Ladies Scottish Climbing Club in 1909

Jane Inglis Clark (1859/1860–1950) was a Scottish mountaineer and rock climber. She co-founded the Ladies' Scottish Climbing Club with Lucy Smith and Mabel Clark in 1908.

== Life ==
Inglis Clark was born Jane Isabella Shannon to Isabella Struthers Wilson and David Shannon, a tea planter. In 1884 she married William Inglis Clark and they had two children, Mabel Clark (1885–1967) and Charles Clark (1888–1918).

During the First World War, Inglis Clark was a Voluntary Aid Detachment Commandant for the Red Cross. From 1919–1938 she was a parish and county councillor in Edinburgh, where she also served as a Justice of the Peace.

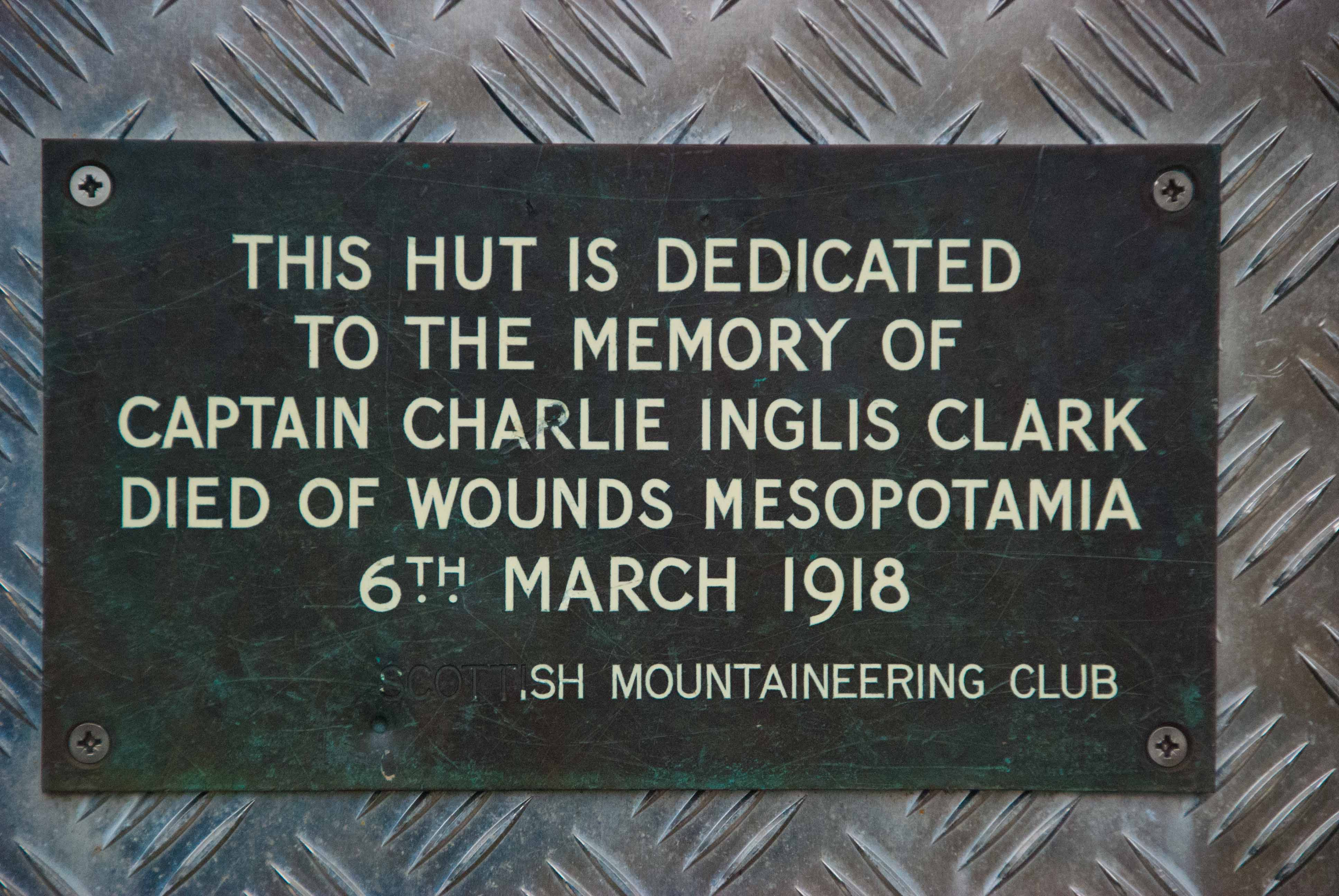
Memorial plaque on the door of the CIC Hut

== Mountaineering ==
Inglis Clark was a keen hillwalker who discovered rock climbing in 1897. With a natural aptitude for climbing difficult routes, from 1897 to 1904, Inglis Clark was part of six first ascents on Ben Nevis. She was proud to be a pioneer and was keen to encourage other women to take up mountaineering.

Since women were not allowed to join the all-male Scottish Mountaineering Club, Inglis Clark, together with Lucy Smith and her daughter Mabel founded the Ladies Scottish Climbing Club in 1908. The Club's purpose was "to bring together Ladies who are lovers of mountain-climbing, and to encourage mountaineering in Scotland, in winter as well as in summer."

Inglis Clark wrote about her mountaineering experiences in her book Pictures and Memories, published in 1938, which also commemorates women’s increased participation in climbing.

There is no sport like mountaineering. It is the overcoming of difficulties, the mental climbing, as well as the physical, that give it such a zest. The troubles of life seem to fade away in the presence of the everlasting hills. We may go out tired and worn in mind and body; we return renewed and restored: health re-established and friendships strengthened.

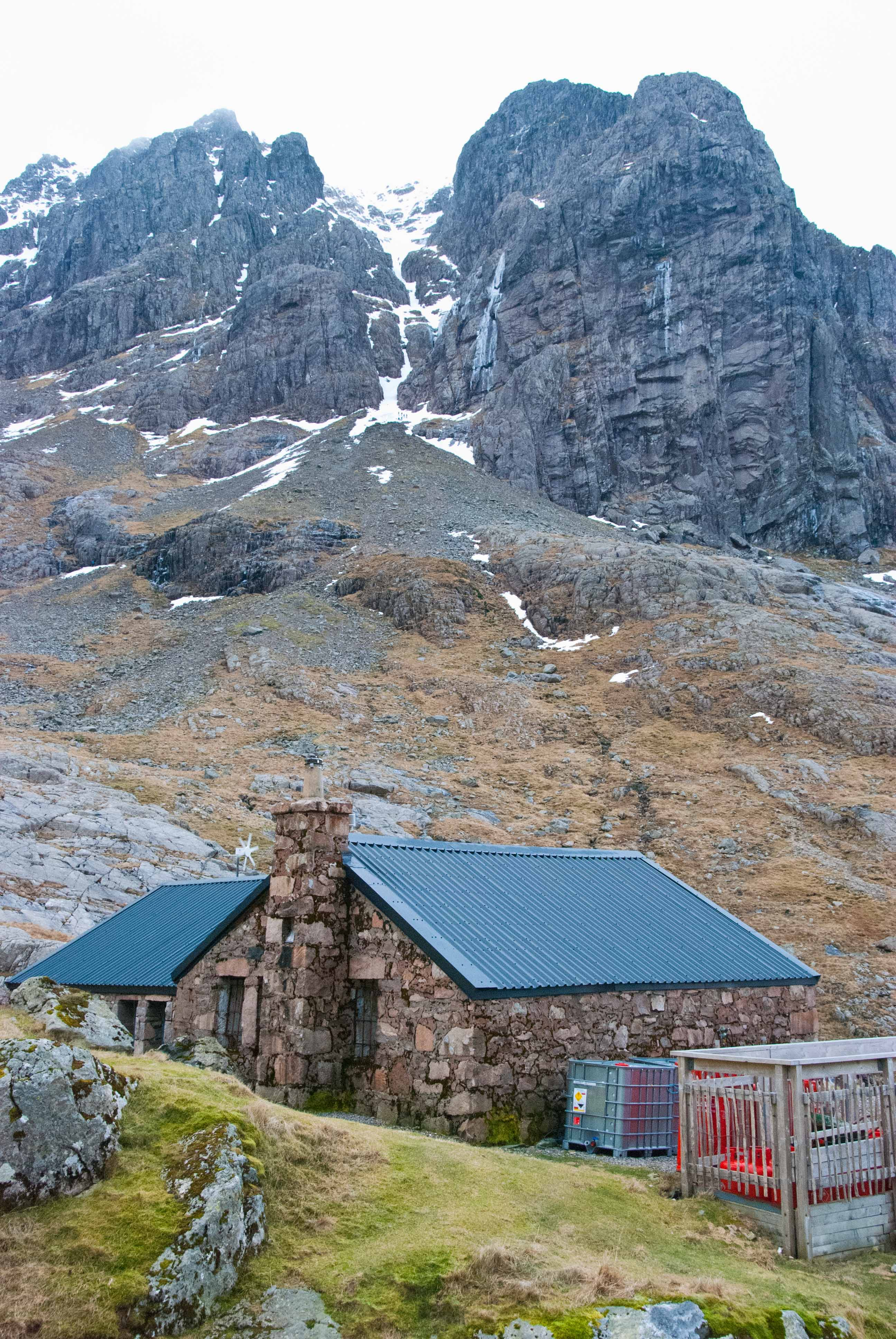
Charles Inglis Clark Memorial Hut on Ben Nevis

== Charles Inglis Clark Memorial Hut ==
As a memorial of their son, a keen mountaineer who was killed in the First World War, Jane and William Inglis Clark funded the Charles Inglis Clark Memorial Hut on Ben Nevis, which opened in 1929. Archive footage shows mountaineers gathering on Ben Nevis for the opening ceremony.

== Bibliography ==
- Clark, Jane Inglis (1938). Pictures and Memories. Moray Press.
