= List of road junctions in the United Kingdom: L =

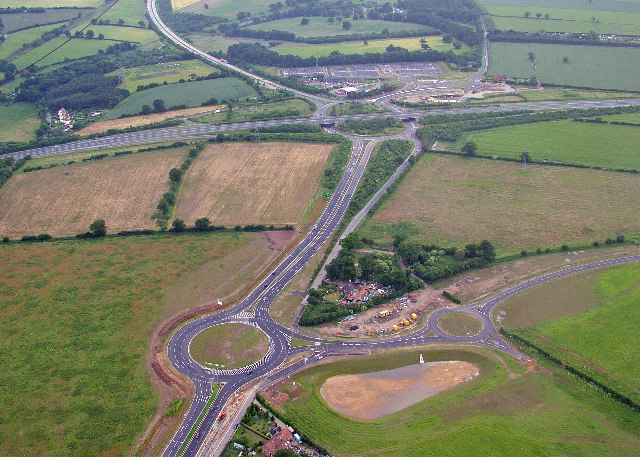
Thickthorn Interchange

This is part of the list of road junctions in the United Kingdom.

Many road junctions are named after pubs. For more information regarding the derivation of pub names see pub names.

== L ==
Junction Name	Type	Location	Roads	Grid Reference	Notes
Labbett's Cross	T junction	Chawleigh, Mid Devon	B3042; unclass., to Lapford	50.8902°N 3.8137°W	Named on fingerpost
Lacton Interchange		Ashford, Kent, Kent	M20 J10; A20 Hythe Road; A2070 Kennington Road; A2070 Bad Munstereifel Road; A292 Hythe Road	51°08′14″N 0°54′39″E	
Lady Margaret		Swindon, Wiltshire, Wiltshire	A4312, Drakes Way; unclass., to Coleview		
Lakeside Roundabout		Newlands, Milton Keynes	V10 Brickhill Street; Frobisher Gate	52°02′58″N 0°43′29″W	
Lana Cross	T junction	Bradford, Devon	unclass. roads to: Thornbury N; Dipper Mill E; Hole Moor S	50.8376°N 4.2429°W	Named on fingerpost
Laneys Drove Roundabout	Roundabout	Locking, North Somerset	A371 Locking Moor Road; Laneys Drove; Weston Business Park	51°20′21.11″N 2°55′41.47″W	Built in 1999. Formerly Helicopter Roundabout (until 2017)
Lampool Roundabout	Roundabout	Maresfield, East Sussex	A22; A22 High Street; Straight Half Mile	TQ461253	
Lancaster Circus	Roundabout with overbridge	Birmingham	A4400, St Chads Queensway (surface level); A38, St Chads Queensway (tunnel and overbridge); A38, Aston Expressway; B4114, James Watt Queensway (former A4400); B4114, Lancaster Street, New Town Row (former A34)		The sections named Queensway are part of the former Inner Ring Road.
Lancing Manor Roundabout	Roundabout	Lancing, West Sussex	A27 Upper Brighton Road; A27 Old Shoreham Road; A2025 Grinstead Lane; Manor Road	TQ 18572 05492	
Landulph Cross	Crossroads	Cargreen, Cornwall	unclass.; unclass.	SX426625	
Lane End Cross	Crossroads	Sydenham Damerel, Devon	unclass.; unclass.	SX414754	
Laney Green: see Cannock Interchange
Langford Turn		Edworth, Bedfordshire	A1 London Road (northbound); Edworth Road	52°03′06″N 0°13′46″W	N/B only - see Edworth Turn
Lamerhooe Cross	Crossroads	Lamerhooe, Devon	unclass.; unclass.	SX403742	
Langham Interchange	Trumpet	Rawcliffe, East Yorkshire	M62 J35; M18 J7	SE682213	
Langley Roundabout		Langley, Berkshire	M4 J5; A4 London Road; B470 Farm Road	51°29′31″N 0°32′35″W	
Langley Sidings	Roundabout Interchange	Stevenage, Hertfordshire	A1(M) J7; A602 Broadhall Way	51°53′15″N 0°12′24″W	
Lapford Cross	Crossroads	Lapford, Mid Devon	A377; unclass. Kelland Hill	50.8542°N 3.8078°W	
Larkhall Interchange		Larkhall, South Lanarkshire	M74 J7; A72 Lanark Road; Duke Street	55°45′15″N 3°58′17″W	
Lavender Corner: see The Queen Victoria
Lawrence Weston Interchange		Avonmouth, Bristol	M5 J18/18a; M49; A4 Bristow Way; B4054 Avonmouth Road	51°30′07″N 2°40′28″W	
Lawton Crossroads		Church Lawton, Cheshire	A50; A5011; B5077	SJ809558	
Lea Interchange		Temple Mills, LB Newham	A12 East Cross Route; A106; Waterden Road; B112 Homerton Road	51°33′04″N 0°01′16″W	aka Temple Mills, because of its location at the Temple Mills bridge.
Leadenhall Roundabout		Oldbrook, Milton Keynes	H7 Chaffron Way; V6 Grafton Street	52°01′32″N 0°45′31″W	
Leamouth Junction		Leamouth, LB Tower Hamlets	A13 East India Dock Road; A1020 Leamouth Road; B125 Abbot Road; Lanrick Road	TQ389812	just to the north of Leamouth Roundabout
Leamouth Roundabout		Leamouth, LB Tower Hamlets	A1261 Aspen Way; A1020 Leamouth Road; A1020 Lower Lea Crossing; Newport Avenue; Saffron Avenue; Silvocea Way	51°30′39″N 0°0′4″E	just to the south of Leamouth Junction
Leavesden Green		Watford, Hertfordshire	A41 North Western Avenue; A405 North Orbital Road (Kingsway); Gade Side	51°41′06″N 0°24′49″W	
Lee Green	Crossroads	Lee, LB Lewisham	A20 Lee High Road; A20 Eltham Road; B212 Lee Road; A2212 Burnt Ash Road	51°27′24″N 0°00′41″E	
Leigh Cross	Crossroads	Chulmleigh, North Devon	A377; B3096 Leigh Road; unclass., to Bridge Reeve	50.90945°N 3.8970°W	Named on road signs at junction
Leigh Cross		near Sydenham Damerel, Devon	unclass.; unclass.	SX398772	
Leonard Moor Cross		Uffculme, Devon	B3181 (formerly A38); unclass.	ST052131	
Letchworth Gate	Roundabout Interchange	Letchworth, Hertfordshire	A1(M) J9; A505 (formerly A6141)	TL235310	
Lickey End		Lickey End, Worcestershire	M42 J1; A38 Birmingham Road; B4096 Alcester Road; B4096 Old Birmingham Road	SO969731	
Lightwood Roundabout		Sheffield, South Yorkshire	A6102; Norton Avenue; Lightwood Lane	53°20′15″N 1°26′35″W	
Lime Kiln		Stoke-on-Trent, Staffordshire	A52; A5008; A5009		
Lion Roundabout	Roundabout	Gravesend, Kent	A226 Rochester Road; B261 Old Road East; Lower Higham Road; Dering Way	51°25′56.7″N 0°23′37.4″E	
Little Eaton Roundabout		Derby, Derbyshire	A38; A61; B6179	52°57′23″N 1°27′35″W	
Little Heath		Near Goodmayes, LB Redbridge	A12 Eastern Avenue; B177 Barley Lane; Hainault Road	51°34′58″N 0°07′02″E	
Littlebrook Interchange		Dartford, Kent	A282 Dartford Tunnel Approach Road J1a; A206 University Way; A206 Crossways Boulevard; B2228 Cotton Lane	51°27′09″N 0°14′27″E	
Lix Toll Junction		Glen Dochart, Perthshire	A85; A827	NN547302	
Lizzie Bryce Roundabout		Livingston, West Lothian	A71; A899 Spine Road; B8046	NT068663	Lizzie Brice (or Bryce) was an old woman who lived with her daughter at Raw Cottage (at the South end of the Spine Road). She acquired the reputation of being a witch, but she was really just a poor woman, born in 1776 and died in 1865. The strip of woodland by her cottage came to be known as Lizzie Brice's strip.
Lodge Roundabout		Great Holm, Milton Keynes	H4 Dansteed Way; V5 Great Monks Street	52°02′20″N 0°47′38″W	
Lodge Avenue Junction		Barking, LB Barking and Dagenham	A13 Alfreds Way; A13 Ripple Road; A123 Ripple Road; A1153 Lodge Avenue	51°31′58″N 0°06′33″E	formerly known as Ripple Road Junction. Lodge Avenue is now the signed variant.
Lofthouse Interchange		Lofthouse, West Yorkshire	M1 J42; M62 J29	53°43′51″N 1°30′44″W	
Lombard Roundabout		London Borough of Croydon	A23 Purley Way; A23 Thornton Road; A236 Mitcham Road	51°23′07″N 0°07′16″W	
Lombard Roundabout	Roundabout	Redhill, Surrey	A23 Princess Way; A25 London Road; A23 London Road; Gloucester Way	TQ280508	Named on road signage
London Road Interchange		Braintree, Essex	A120; B1256; London Road (formerly A131)	TL750219	
London Road Roundabout		Twickenham	A316 Chertsey Road; A310 London Road	51°27′21″N 0°19′49″W	
Longbarrow Crossroads		Wiltshire	A303; A360	51°10′20″N 1°51′33″W	
Longbridge Roundabout	Roundabout	Crawley, West Sussex	A23 London Road; A217; A23 Brighton Road; Povey Cross Road	TQ274424	
Longbridge Roundabout		Warwickshire	M40 J15; A46; A429	SP265625	currently being improved by the Highways Agency, with a dual carriageway for the A46 bypassing the busy junction
Longford Roundabout		Longford, Hillingdon	A3044 Stanwell Moor Road; Bath Road	51°28′45″N 0°29′40″W	
The Longshoot		Nuneaton, Warwickshire	A5; A47	52°32′13″N 1°25′15″W	
Longstone Cross	Staggered	Carbis Bay, St Ives, Cornwall	A3074 St Ives Road; unclass. Porthrepta Road; unclass. Trencrom Lane	50.1926°N 5.4618°W	
Loosedon Cross	Crossroads	Barwick, Winkleigh, Devon	unclass. roads to: Ashreigney; Winkleigh; Iddesleigh; Dolton	50.8694°N 3.9938°W	Named on fingerpost
Lopcombe Corner		Winterslow, Wiltshire	A30; A343	SU249354	
Lord Lees Junction		Chatham, Kent	A229 Maidstone Road; A229 Taddington Wood Spur	TQ745627	
Lordsmill Roundabout		Chesterfield, Derbyshire	A617; A619; A632; B6543	53°14′0″N 1°25′27″W	
Lothianburn Junction		Edinburgh	A720; A702	NT249676	
Loughton Roundabout		Loughton, Milton Keynes	H5 Portway; V4 Watling Street	52°01′50″N 0°47′40″W	
Lower Cross		Culmstock, Devon	Brooks Hill; unclass.	ST083143	
Lower Kilburn Interchange		Lower Kilburn, Derbyshire	A38; B6179 Derby Road	SK371445	
Lowfield Roundabout	Roundabout	Crawley, West Sussex	A23 London Road; Old Brighton Road South	TQ271398	
Ludgate Circus		City of London	A201 Farringdon Road; A201 New Bridge Street; Fleet Street; Ludgate Hill	51°30′51″N 0°06′16″W	
Lune Valley Interchange: aka Halton	Diamond Interchange	Lancaster, Lancashire	M6 J34; A683	54°04′17″N 2°46′18″W	
Lydiate Ash		Lydiate Ash, West Midlands	M5 J4; A38 Birmingham Road; A491 Sandy Lane	52°22′43″N 2°02′50″W	
Lymm Interchange		Warrington, Cheshire	M6 J20; M56 J9	53°21′10″N 2°30′01″W	
