= William Inglis Clark =

Scottish pharmaceutical chemist and mountaineer

- Born: 5 June 1856; Bombay, India
- Died: 21 December 1932 (aged 76); Edinburgh
- Education: University of Edinburgh (D.Sc.)
- Occupation: Chemist
- Spouse: Jane Inglis Clark
- Honours: FRSE

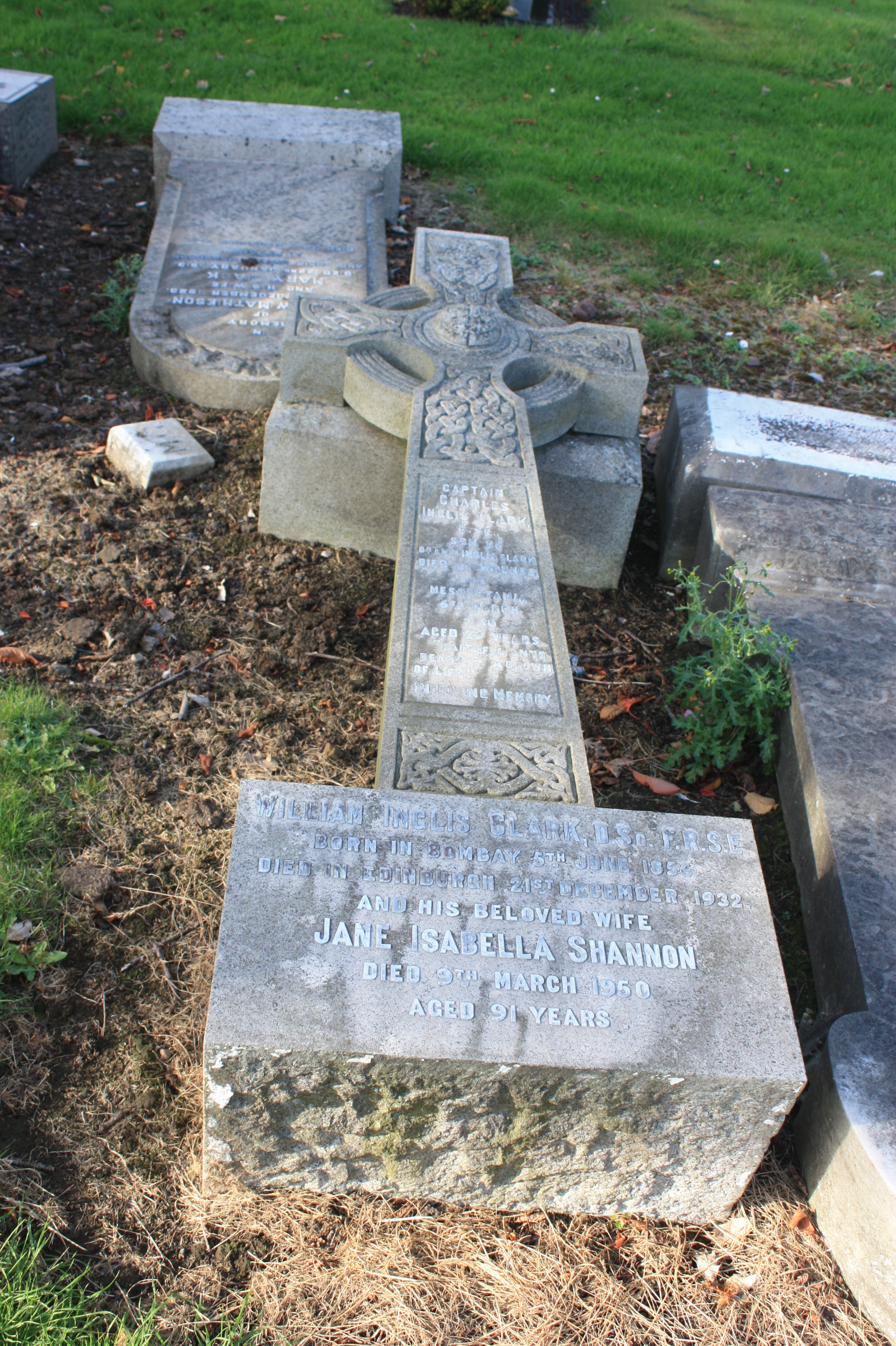
The grave of William Inglis Clark, Liberton Cemetery, Edinburgh

William Inglis Clark FRSE (5 June 1856 – 21 December 1932) was a Scottish pharmaceutical chemist. He is also remembered as a keen amateur mountaineer. Clark invented a neutral encapsulation of foul-tasting medicines. As a chemist and keen amateur photographer he also invented an early colour photographic process in 1909, his subject matter usually stemming from his love of mountains. His early colour photographs appeared from 1909 in the Scottish Mountaineering Club Journal.

== Life ==
He was born in Bombay in India on 5 June 1856 to Margaret Grace Inglis and Reverend Thomas Grieve Clark, minister of the Scots Church. His mother died of cholera in 1856 at which point he returned to Britain with his older brother, Thomas S Inglis Clark. He was then educated at the Royal High School in Edinburgh.

He studied chemistry at the University of Edinburgh and was the first person to receive a doctorate (DSc) before the age of 21. In 1871 he received a senior post in the firm of Duncan Flockhart & Co. He rose to be a full partner in the firm. At the end of the 19th century he is recorded as being the first owner of a motor-car in Scotland, an Arrol-Johnston dog-cart. This resulted in his having the first Scottish registration plate S1. He later sold this number to Lord Kingsburgh, obtaining the number S2 for his own use.

He was elected a Fellow of the Royal Society of Edinburgh in 1910. His proposers were Alexander Crum Brown, Sir Isaac Bayley Balfour and Cargill Gilston Knott.

He travelled widely and after his death his wife produced the book "Pictures and Memories" which details his travels in the Alps, Myanmar, Thailand, Java, India, China and Japan and is illustrated with his photographs.

He died at home, 1 Belgrave Place in Edinburgh on 21 December 1932. He is buried in the south-west section of Liberton Cemetery. The stone lies just east of the central roundel. It has been vandalised, and, as of 2015, was lying on its back.

== Mountaineering ==
Clark climbed Goat Fell on Arran aged only nine. He seems to have been inspired by his mountaineering uncle, Charles Simson Clark. In one early climb on Ben Nevis he met fellow mountaineers, Prof Matthew Forster Heddle and the artist Colin Philp.

He joined the Scottish Mountaineering Club in 1895. He served as their secretary for 11 years, and was their President from 1914 to 1919. In 1902 he is credited with the second direct ascent of Crowberry Ridge in the Highlands, called "the hardest rock climb in Scotland". His wife Jane Inglis Clark (née Shannon) was also a competent climber and the first president of the Ladies' Scottish Climbing Club.

== Family ==
He married Jane Isabella Shannon in 1884 and they had two children: Mabel and Charles, both of whom were also skilled mountaineers.

Charles was killed in 1918 in the closing months of the First World War. As a memorial the Clarks funded the Charles Inglis Clark Memorial Hut, a bothy on Ben Nevis. A film of its opening was made on 1 April 1929.
