= Scottish Women's Himalayan Expedition =

1955 Himalayan expedition

The Scottish Women's Himalayan Expedition was a 1955 climbing expedition to the Jugal Himal by Scottish climbers Monica Jackson, Elizabeth (Betty) Stark and Evelyn McNicol. The expedition is recognized as the first all women's climbing expedition to the Himalayas. At the time, While there, Jackson and Stark alongside sherpas Mingma Gyalgen and Ang Temba Sherpa made the first ascent of a then-unnamed peak, today known as Gyalzen Peak (6151m).

== Background ==
In 1954, Monica Jackson shared her experience of climbing in the Himalayas with the Glasgow chapter of the Ladies' Scottish Climbing Club. After her talk, Elizabeth (Betty) Stark and Evelyn McNicol, who were in attendance discussed the opportunity of a women's climbing expedition to the Himalayas. Plans for the expedition moved swiftly once the trio decided on an expedition to the little explored Jugal Himal. The group was granted a travel and climbing permit to allow travel to Nepal and plans were made for an expedition in Spring 1955.

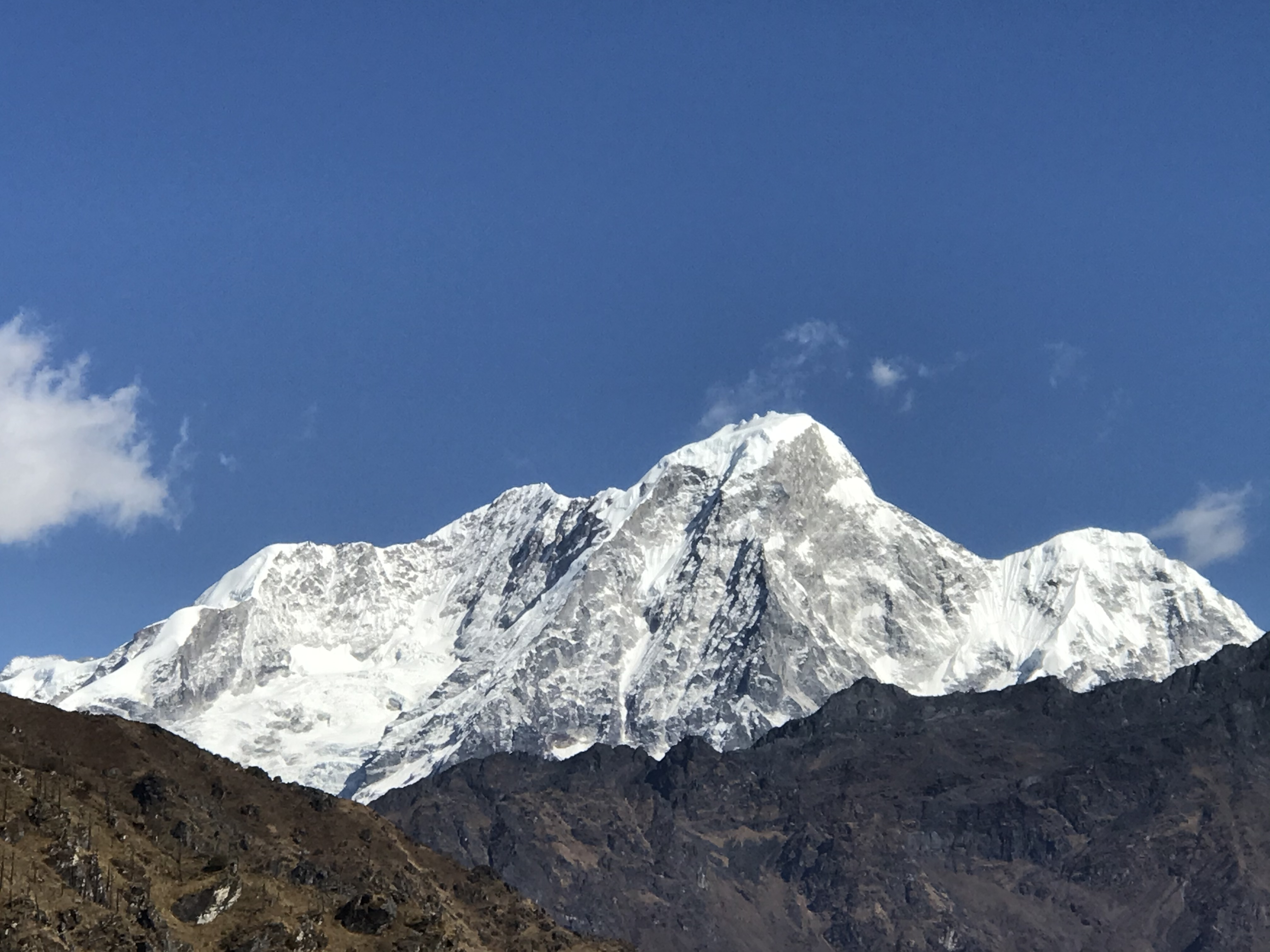
Phurbi Chhyachu in the Jugal Himal

The group declined to elect a leader, and sought to keep their expedition away from the press. Word quickly got out when the group reached Katmandu on April 10, where they recruited a team of climbing sherpas and porters for their journey to the Jugal Himal. Once the team was established, the expedition began in the village of Tempathang where they would begin trekking for several weeks. After crossing Phurbi Chyachu, and making an extensive survey of the glacier, the group looked for a suitable peak to climb.

Choosing one that appeared to have a gentled domed top, Monica Jackson, Betty Stark and sherpas Mingma Gyalgen and Ang Temba Sherpa donned crampons and began their ascent up the then-unnamed mountain. Evelyn McNicol would not attempt the climb after suffering altitude sickness. The climbing party reached the top of the 6151m mountain, on May 11, 1955. Jackson and Stark named the peak Gyalgen Peak after their head sherpa, Mingma Gyalgen.

The trio returned to Scotland on June 1, 1955. Recognized as the first all-women's climbing expedition to the Himalayas, the women's expedition garnered significant attention from the press. At the time, Monica Jackson said, "I think that we, in common with most mountaineers who go to climb in the Himalaya, went there on a sort of pilgrimage." Upon their return, Jackson and Stark wrote Tents in the Clouds ISBN 978-1580050333, sharing the story of their expedition. The book was published in 1957.

=== Legacy ===
Today the peak climbed by the expedition team is known as Gyalzen Peak or Leonpo Gang East. In 2024, Scottish climber Emma Holgate and a team of Scottish women returned to the Jugal Himal to retrace the steps of the Scottish Women's Himalayan Expedition, nearly 70 years after the initial feat. Holgate later directed and produced a mountain film about their journey, titled Footsteps.

== See also ==
- American Women's Himalayan Expedition, 1978 expedition to climb Annapurna
- 1955 British Kangchenjunga expedition, first successful summit of Kangchenjunga that took place during the same time as this expedition
- 1959 Women's Cho Oyu Expedition
- Rendez-vous Hautes Montagnes
- List of women explorers and travelers
