= Elizabeth Stark (explorer) =

Scottish Speech therapist and mountaineer

- Born: 17 September 1923; Glasgow, Scotland, UK
- Died: 2000 (aged 76–77); Indiana, United States
- Known for: climbing the Jugal Himal as part of the first all-female expedition to the Himalayas

Elizabeth "Betty" Stark or Rachel Stark (17 September 1923 – 2000) was a British speech therapist and mountaineer. She climbed the Jugal Himal during the first all-female expedition to the Himalayas in 1955. She became an expert in audiology and speech sciences and she was a professor at Purdue University.

== Life ==
Stark was born in Glasgow and she was known as Rachel when she was a girl. Her family moved to London, but at age 14 she was evacuated. Despite taking on the task of home worker from her unhealthy mother she managed to pass the London University entrance exam by correspondence. However, her family's finances prevented her from enjoying a university education.

Two of her aunts came to her rescue and they paid for their niece to train as a teacher. During teacher training she heard that further training was available in speech therapy. She started work as a primary school teacher but she used her evenings and weekends to study and to gain experience. She was qualified by the London College of Speech Therapists and gained experience in hospitals in Glasgow. She became a speech therapist working in schools.

She became a climber and in 1954 she took part in an early expedition to the Lyngen Peninsula in Norway. The other mountaineers from the Ladies' Scottish Climbing Club were Cynthia Marr, Evelyn Camress (later McNicol) and Elma Wrench.

The Ladies's Scottish Climbing Club had not been to the Himalayas. It was reported that the group studied a map of the mountain ranges and someone said that the area of the Langtang and the Jugal Himal was not well known. Stark became a member of what was claimed as the "first non-male expedition" to scale the Jugal Himal in the Himalayas in 1955 although this ignored the male sherpas who were a vital part of the expedition. The expedition was funded by Life magazine and Collins the publisher. She climbed the Jugal Himal with Monica Jackson and Evelyn McNicol, although McNicol had to stay at base camp due to sickness. They managed to get to the previously unmapped Phurbal Chyachumbu glacier and made it to the unclimbed peak on the frontier of Nepal and Tibet. They named it Gyalgen Peak, after their lead Sherpa, Mingma Gualgen. The Gyalgen or Gyalzen or Leonpo Gang East peak is on the border of the Nepalese Bagmati Province and China and it is 6151 m / 20,180 feet high.

In 1957, Stark and Jackson wrote the book Tents in the Clouds: the first women’s Himalayan expedition about the adventure.

She found that mountaineering became more technical. She wasn't interested in these changes and her interest in speech therapy grew as her interest in mountaineering diminished. She developed a technique for transcribing the early sounds of toddlers.

In 1987, she became a professor of audiology and speech sciences at Purdue University in Indiana.

== Death and legacy ==
Stark died in Indiana in 2000.

The Scottish National Portrait Gallery had a show called On Top Of The World from 2002 to 2003 that included pictures of Stark and the expedition team.

== Private life ==
She married twice.
