= Evelyn McNicol =

Scottish explorer and mountaineer (1927–2021)

The expedition doctor

Evelyn McNicol (née Camrass; 11 October 1927 – 15 April 2021) was a Scottish obstetrician and explorer. She was among the first recorded Western "all-women" Himalayan mountaineering expedition.

== Early life and education ==
McNicol was a medical doctor, and graduated from University of Glasgow in 1952. She was president of the University of Glasgow mountaineering club from 1950 to 1951.

She was a member of the Ladies Scottish Climbing Club. In 1954 she took part in an early expedition to the Lyngen Peninsula in Norway. The other mountaineers from the Ladies' Scottish Climbing Club were Cynthia Marr, Elizabeth "Betty" Stark and Elma Wrench.

== The Scottish Women's Himalayan Expedition ==
At age 28, McNicol (then Evelyn Camrass) was the youngest member of the first recorded all-women mountaineering trip to the Himalayas, along with Monica Jackson and Elizabeth Stark. The three explored the mostly unmapped region of Jugal Himal. It was claimed as an all-women expedition although they used male Sherpas once in the Himalayas.

In Spring 1955, McNicol, Jackson and Stark sailed to India, from which they flew to Kathmandu. The expedition lasted three months, arriving and returning at Kathmandu on 10 April 1955 and 1 June 1955 respectively.

During this expedition they explored the previously unmapped Phurbal Chyachumbu glacier, and made the first ascent of Gyalgen Peak, a 22,000 feet mountain on the border of Nepal and Tibet, which they named after their head Sherpa.

On 11 May 1955, Stark and Jackson reached the summit of Gyalgen Peak, but McNicol was suffering altitude headaches and remained at their last camp. She later climbed a ridge close to the group's base camp, from which she made corrections to their Survey of India map.

From 2002-2003 the Scottish National Portrait Gallery had an exhibition called On Top Of The World which included pictures of McNicol and her team.

== Personal life ==
After the 1955 expedition, McNicol returned to Scotland, to her role as on obstetrician in Edinburgh. She married and had three children. She no longer mountaineered, but still enjoyed hillwalking in Scotland with other former Glasgow University climbing club members.
