= List of road junctions in the United Kingdom: Q =

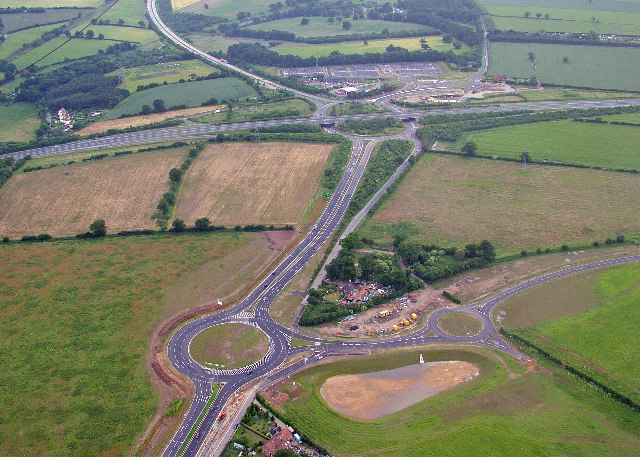
Thickthorn Interchange

This is part of the list of road junctions in the United Kingdom.

Many road junctions are named after pubs. For more information regarding the derivation of pub names see pub names.

== Q ==
Junction name	Type	Location	Roads	Grid reference	Notes
Quarries Cross	Grade separated junction	Haughley, Suffolk	A14 (formerly A45); The Folly; Haugley Road	TM022617	Crossroads upgraded to grade-separated junction opened in January 2009.
Quarry Cross	Crossroads	Bere Alston, Devon	B3257; Park Road; unclass.	SX456671	
Queen Eleanor Interchange	Roundabout Interchange	Northampton	A45 Nene Valley Way; A45 Mere Way; A508 London Road; B526 Newport Pagnell Road; Hardingstone Lane	SP756580	The name is a reference to the nearby Eleanor cross
The Queen Victoria: aka Lavender Corner	Crossroads	North Cheam, LB Sutton	A24 London Road; A2043 Cheam Common Road; A2043 Malden Road	TQ234650	
Queen's Circus: aka Queen's Circle		Battersea, London	A3216 Queenstown Road; Prince of Wales Drive	51°28′41″N 0°08′55″W	
Queen's Roundabout		Astley, Greater Manchester	A580 East Lancashire Road; A572 Chaddock Lane	SD715010	
Queen's Road Junction		Attleborough, Norfolk	A11 Attleborough Bypass; B1077 Queen's Road; B1077 Ellingham Road	TM043958	
Queen's Road Roundabout		Newbury, Berkshire	A339 (formerly A34) Greenham Road; Sandleford Link; A343 St John's Road; Queen's Road	51°23′46″N 1°19′14″W	
Queensway Roundabout	Roundabout	Scunthorpe, Lincolnshire	A18 Kingsway; Ashby Road; A18 Queesnway; A159 Ashby Road	SE891099	
Queensway Roundabout	Roundabout	Worle, North Somerset	Ebdon Road; Queensway; Savernake Road	51°21′56.30″N 2°55′24.44″W	Formerly Endeavour Roundabout (until c.2020)
Quicksilver Roundabout		Yeovil, Somerset	A30 Hendford Hill; A30 Lysander Road; A37 Dorchester Road	50°55′56″N 2°38′38″W	
Quinton Interchange	Roundabout Interchange	Quinton, West Midlands	M5 J3; A456 Manor Way; A456 Quinton Expressway	SO991835	
Quintrell Downs Roundabout	Roundabout	Quintrell Downs, Cornwall	A392 East Road; A392 West Road; A3058 North Way	SW849603	
Quy Roundabout	Roundabout Interchange	Stow cum Quy, Cambridgeshire	A14 (formerly A45); A1303 Newmarket Road	52°12′51″N 0°12′58″E	
