= Kirat Chuli =

Mountain in the Himalayas

- Tent Peak
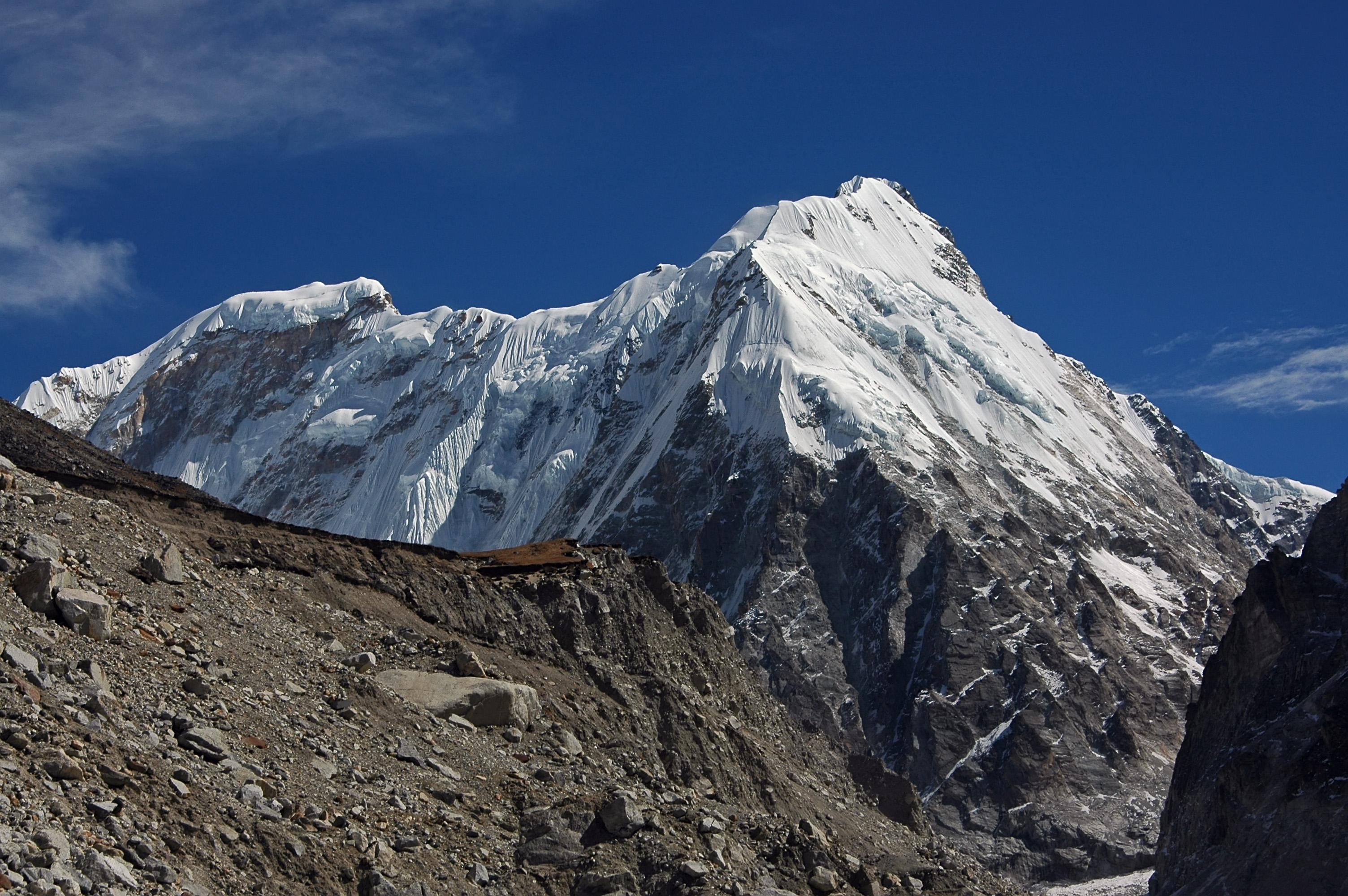
- Kirat Chuli (left) and Nepal Peak (right)

Highest point
- Elevation: 7,365 m (24,163 ft); Ranked 76th
- Prominence: 1,168 m (3,832 ft)
- Listing: Mountains of Nepal; Mountains of India
- Coordinates: 27°47′29″N 88°11′50″E

Geography
- Location within Koshi Province Location within Nepal Location within India
- Location: Nepal / Sikkim, India
- Parent range: Himalayas

Climbing
- First ascent: 1939
- Easiest route: rock/snow/ice climb

Kirat Chuli or Tent Peak is a mountain in the Himalayas. It lies on the border between Nepal and India.

== Location ==
The peak is located at 7,365 m (24,163 ft) above sea level in the extreme northeast of Nepal and northwest of Sikkim. It is approximately two km northeast of Nepal Peak.

== Climbing history ==
The first ascent was made by Ernst Grob, Herbert Paidar, and Ludwig Schmaderer on May 29, 1939.

== See also ==
- Kirata
- Kirata Kingdom
- Kirati people
- Kirat Mundhum
