= Monica Jackson =

Scottish climber (1920–2020)

- Born: 16 September 1920; Kotagiri, India
- Died: 7 April 2020 (aged 99); Edinburgh, Scotland
- Occupations: Mountaineer and author

Monica Jackson (16 September 1920 – 7 April 2020) was a Scottish climber and a member of the first female expedition team to scale the Jugal Himal in the Himalayas.

== Early life and education ==
Monica Jackson was born in Kotagiri and grew up in the Biligirirangan Hills of southern India where her father Ralph Camroux Morris and her mother Heather (née Kinloch) were coffee planters. She was sent to a boarding school in Arlesey, Bedfordshire at the age of ten and at sixteen she went to Benington College. She returned to India during World War II. She married Bob Jackson, managing director of Stronachs Advertising in Bombay. In 1949 she moved along with her daughter and son to the UK.

== Climbing career ==
While in the UK Jackson often made trips to the Scottish highlands, where she became a member of the Ladies Scottish Climbing Club. For several years she and her husband lived in Tomintoul and later ran Stein Inn on the Isle of Skye. In 1955, she climbed the Jugal Himal with Elizabeth (Betty) Stark and Evelyn McNicol. They managed to get to the previously unmapped Phurbal Chyachumbu glacier and made it to the 22,000 ft peak on the frontier of Nepal and Tibet. They were the first people to climb the mountain and they named it Gyalgen Peak, after their lead Sherpa, Mingma Gyalgen. They wrote a book Tent in the Clouds (1957).

The Gyalgen or Gyalzen or Loenpo Gang East peak is on the border of the Nepalese Bagmati Province and China and it 6,151 metres (20,180 ft) high.

She also climbed in Turkey, the Alps and the Dolomites.

== Writing and other media ==
After she turned 50, she joined the University of Cambridge and received degrees in archaeology and anthropology. She received funds from the Ministry of Overseas Development to conduct research in the Kollegal region on caste and kinship and received a doctorate from the University of Edinburgh in 1976. She wrote a biographical account of her experience growing up in India as well as on conducting anthropology research at Kollegal in Going Back.

In 1957, Jackson wrote the book Tents in the Clouds: the first women's Himalayan expedition. She wrote about her experience climbing Cilo Dağı in The Turkish Time Machine (1966).

She appeared in a BBC documentary, Eye to Eye, on the history of mountaineering where she was filmed climbing Napes Needle with Horace "Rusty" Westmoreland, who was 71 at the time. Napes Needle was an important location, and some believe that the sport of mountaineering started there.

From 2002 to 2003, the Scottish National Portrait Gallery had a show called On Top of the World that included pictures of Monica Jackson and her team.
