= Glossary of climbing terms =

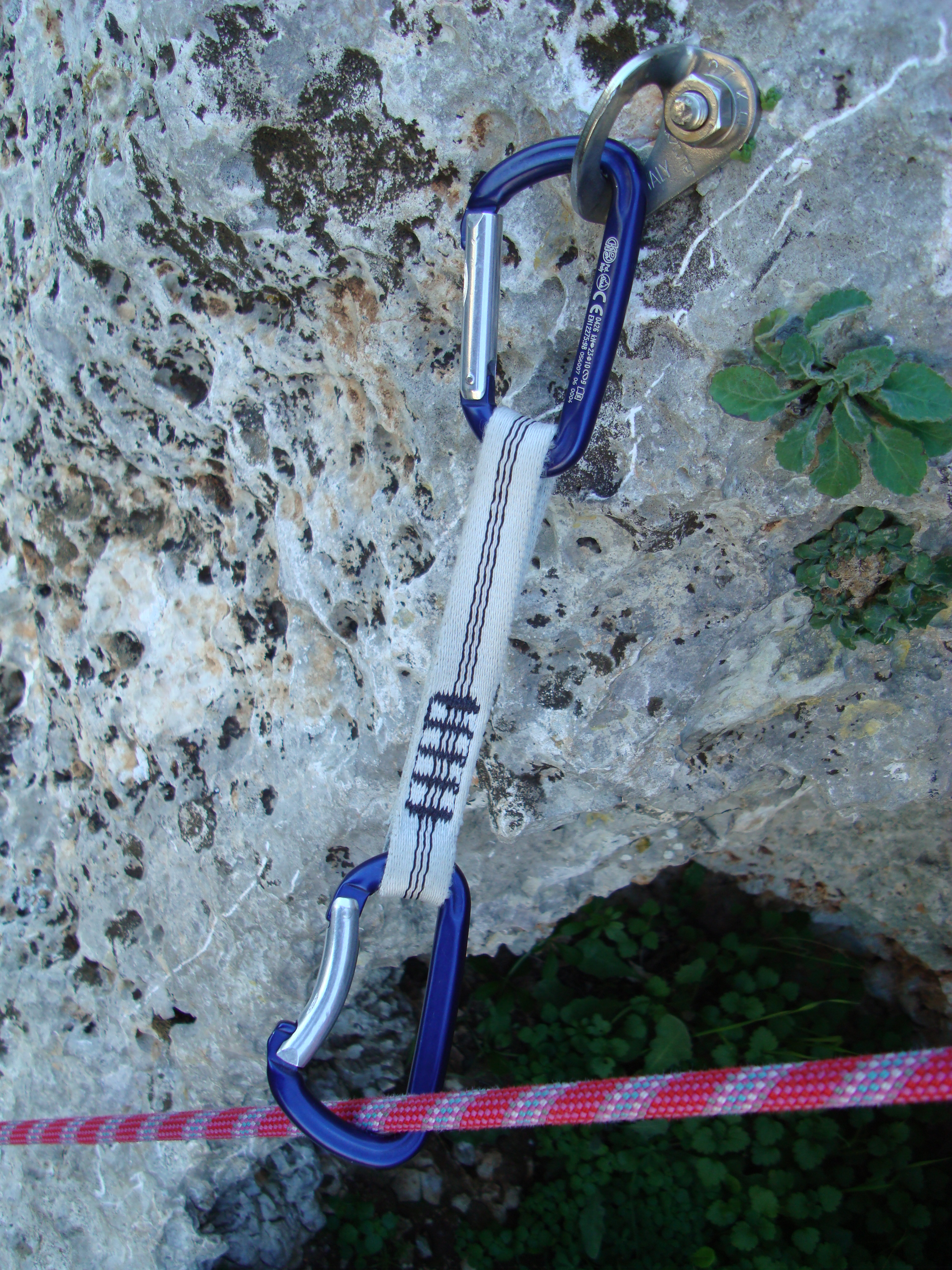
A quickdraw with one end attached to a bolt hanger (which is itself attached to a fixed bolt), and the other end clipped into a dynamic rope, on a sport climb route

This is a glossary of climbing terms related to rock climbing (including aid climbing, lead climbing, bouldering, and competition climbing), mountaineering, and to ice climbing.

The terms used can vary between different English-speaking countries; many of the phrases described here are particular to the United States and the United Kingdom.

== A ==
A-grade

The technical difficulty grading system for aid climbing (both for "original" and an adapted version for "new wave"), which goes: A0, A1, A2, A3, A4, A5 and up to A6 (for "new wave"). See C-grade.
Abalakov thread

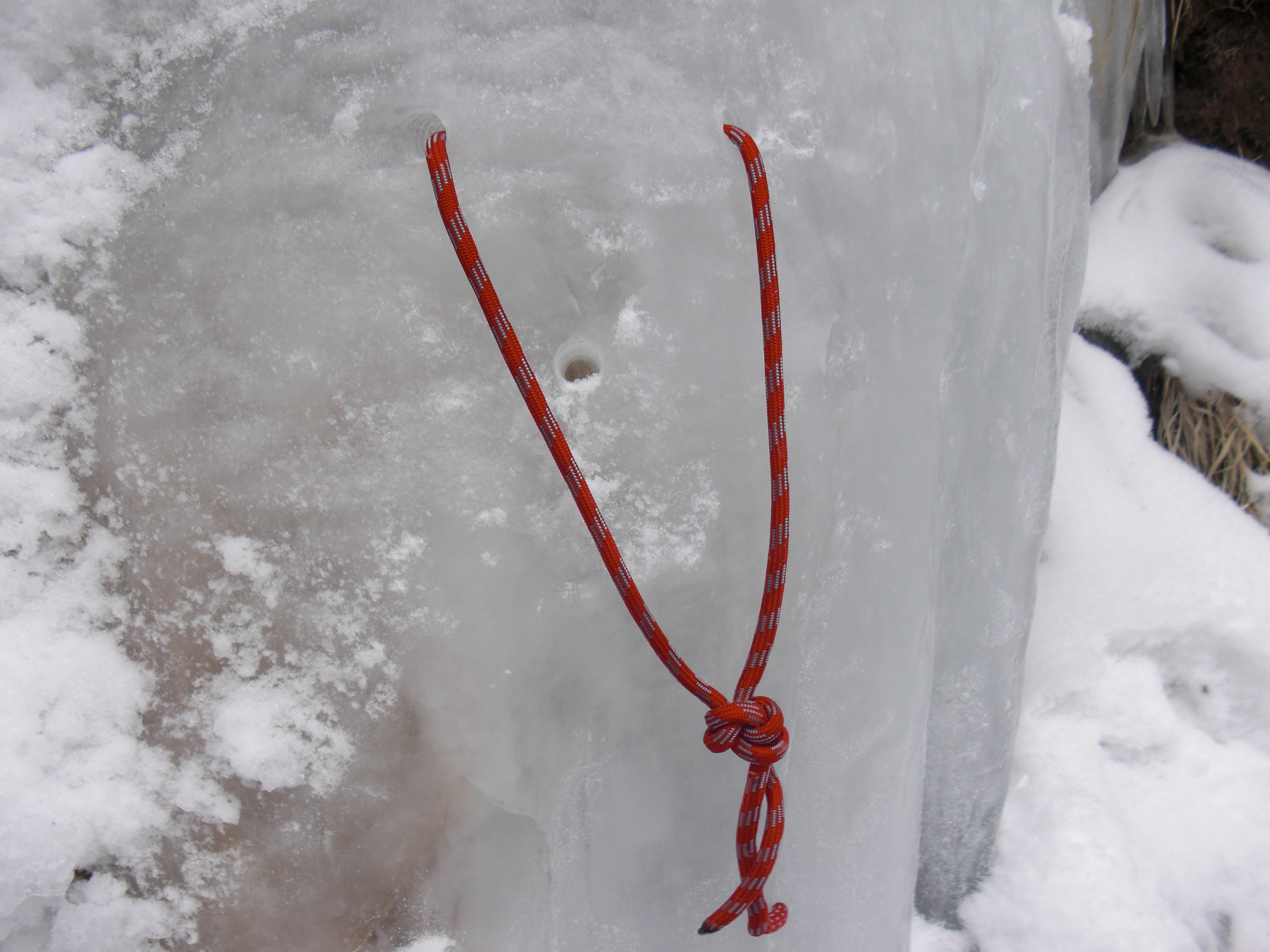
Abalakov thread

A type of anchor used in abseiling especially in winter and in ice climbing.
ABD

A term used to describe a progress capture device or a self-locking device such as a Petzl GriGri that immediately locks if the rope travels through it quickly in a specific direction. See auto belay.
abseiling

A technique by which a climber descends via a fixed rope that is firmly attached to a fixed anchor point, which is also known as an "abseil station". See tat and cord.
abseil rack
See rack.
add-on
An indoor climbing game where climbers take turns creating a route, adding two moves at a time.
accessory cord
See cord.
active protection

Type of protection that dynamically changes to absorb the shape and strength of a fall; active protection is the opposite of passive protection. See cams and friends.
adze

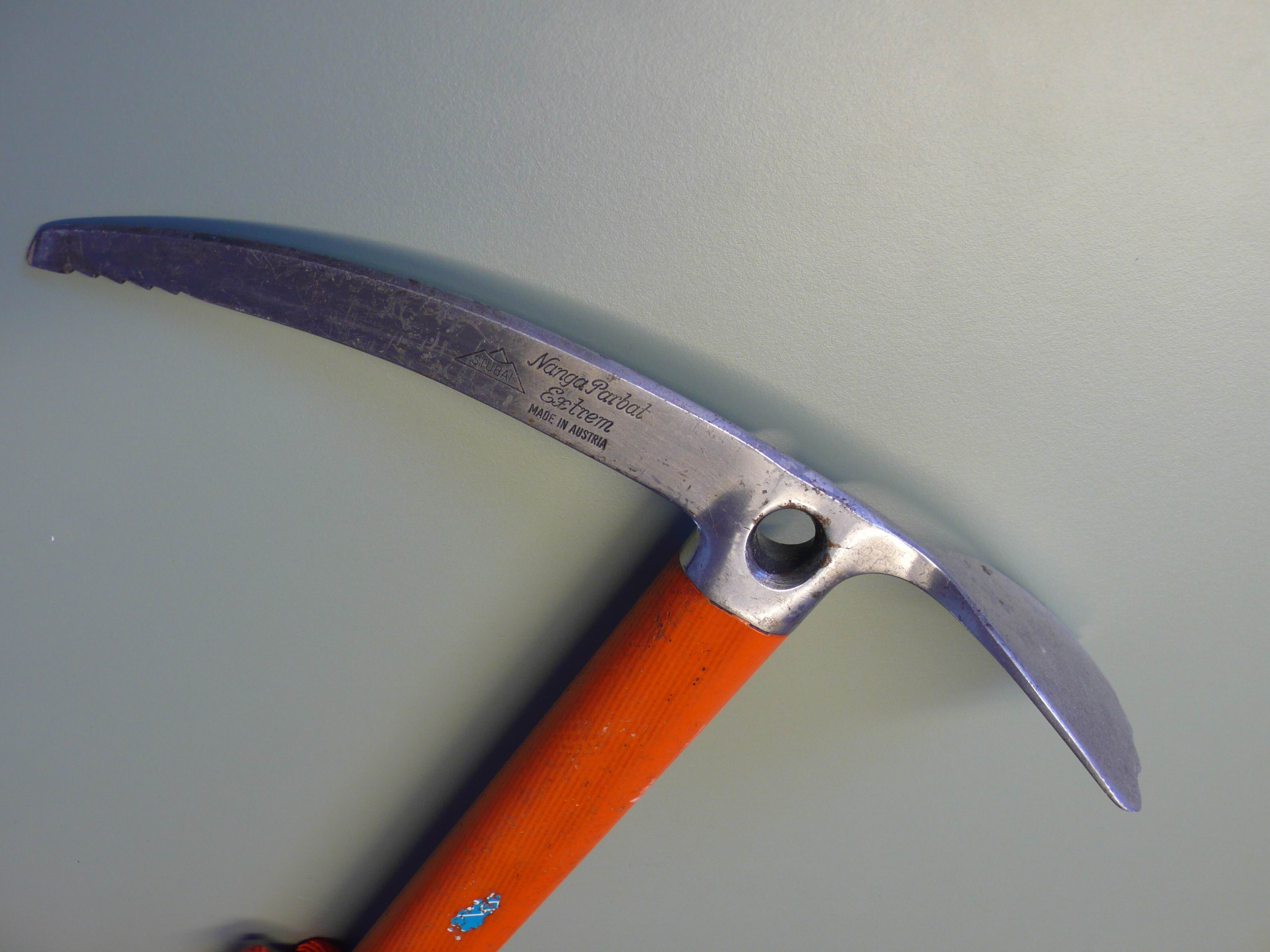
Ice axe with adze

A thin blade mounted perpendicular to the handle on an ice axe; is used for chopping footholds.
aid climbing
Type of rock climbing where artificial devices are used to make upward progress (and not just for protection); opposite of free climbing. See clean aid climbing.
aider
See etrier.
alpine climbing
A form of mountaineering that includes ice climbing, dry-tooling and rock climbing.
Alpine-grade

Part of the alpine climbing system for grading the technical difficulty of alpine climbing routes, which goes: F ("facile/easy"), PD ("peu difficile/little difficult"), AD ("assez difficile/fairly hard"), D ("difficile/difficult"), TD ("très difficile/very hard"), and ED ("extrêmement difficile/extremely difficult"); ED then goes ED1, ED2, ED3, .. etc.
alpine knee
An awkward climbing technique where the knee is placed on the hold rather than the foot.
alpine start
Starting a climb very early in the morning, generally before 5:00 a.m. (and even much earlier); common to alpine climbing to avoid afternoon rockfalls and melting snow on the route, or to get firmer ice on the glacier travel to and from the route.
alpine style
Carrying all your own gear (even for multi-day climbs); also called "light-weight" climbing; opposite of expedition style.
American death triangle

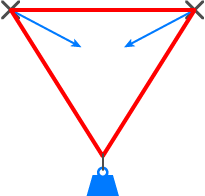
Diagram of American death triangle

A dangerous anchor that is created by connecting a closed loop of webbing between two points of protection.
anchor
An arrangement of one or more pieces of fixed protection set up to support the weight of a belay, a top rope, or an abseiling. See also deadman anchor.
ape index
A measure of the ratio of a climber's arm span relative to their height.
arête
1. A small ridge-like feature or a sharp outward-facing corner on a steep rock face.
2. A narrow ridge of rock formed by glacial erosion.
3. A method of indoor climbing in which one is able to use such a corner as a hold. See also dihedral.
arm bar
A climbing technique where the climber jams their arm into a crack and locks it into place, to aid their ascent.
armchair landing

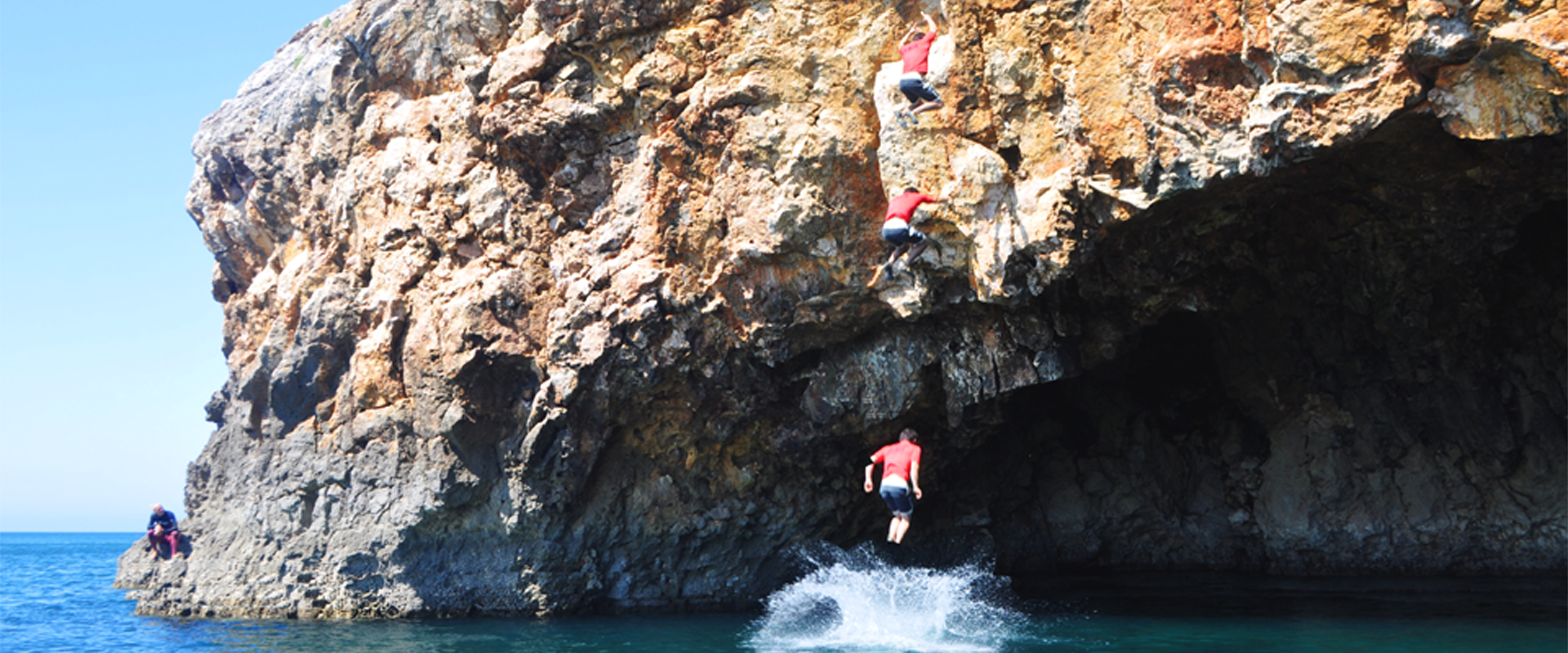
An armchair landing

A technique in deep-water soloing for entering shallower water where the climber needs to avoid deeper hazards in the water; executed properly a 30-foot (9.1 m) fall can be absorbed in just 5 feet (1.5 m) of water.
ascender

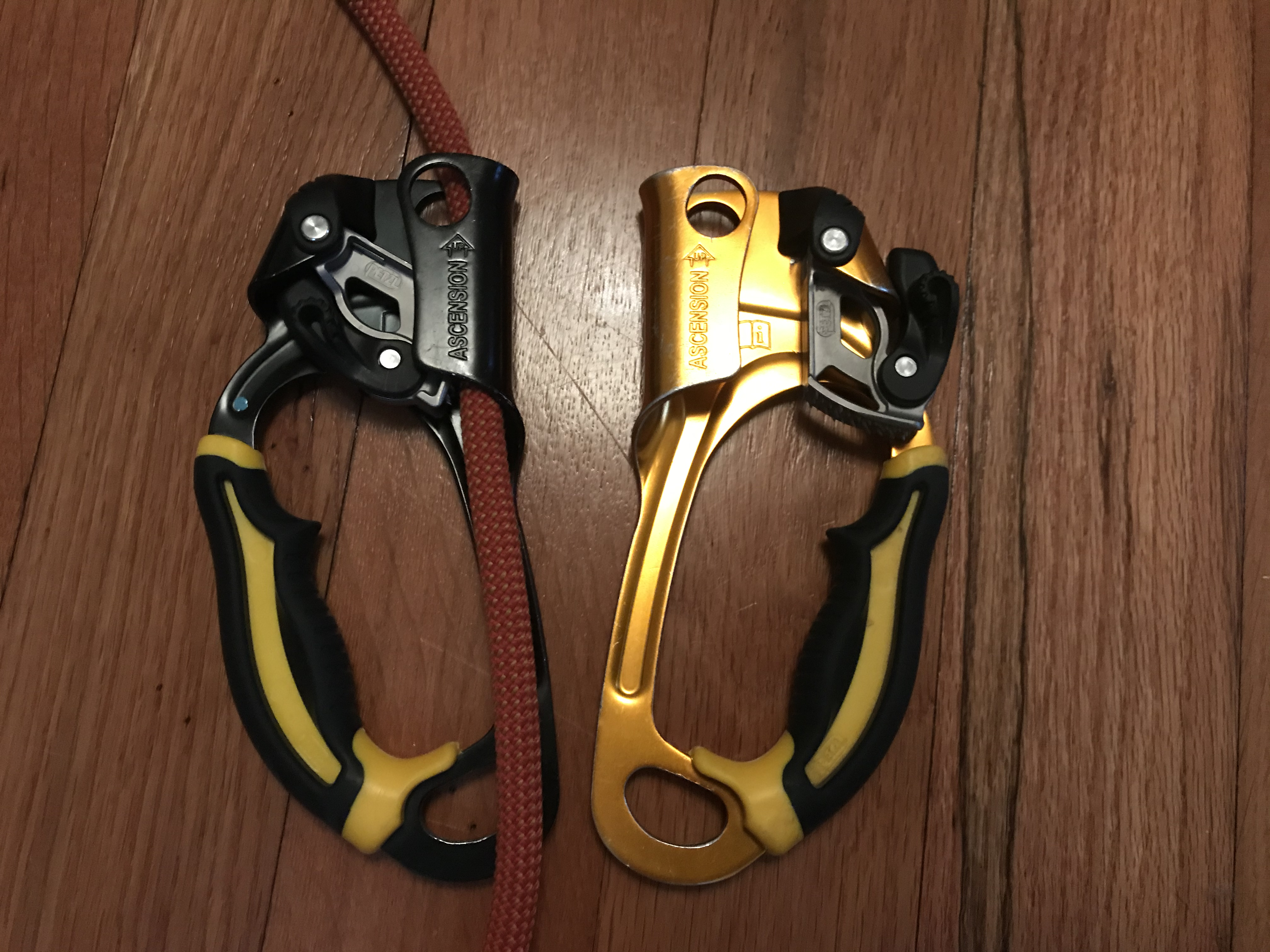
Ascenders

A mechanical device used for ascending a fixed rope, very common in aid climbing and big wall climbing. See jumar.
aspect
The geographical direction which a particular slope or rock wall faces, e.g. "north aspect".
ATC
A belay device from Black Diamond (the "Air Traffic Controller") that became a generic term for any tuber belay device.
Australian rappel

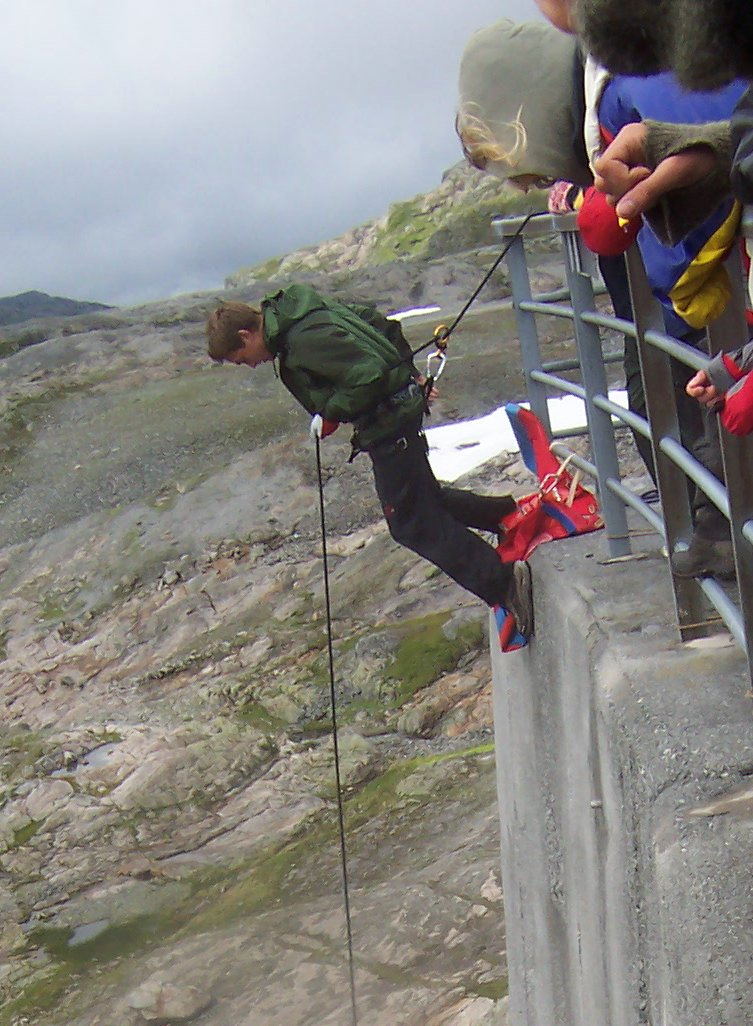
Australian rappel

A type of abseiling technique performed face first; used for military purposes.
auto belay
A mechanical belay device on indoor climbing walls, which hangs from the top of routes that solo climbers clip into.

== B ==
B-grade
A grading system for bouldering invented by John Gill, now superseded by the V-grading system.
Bachar ladder

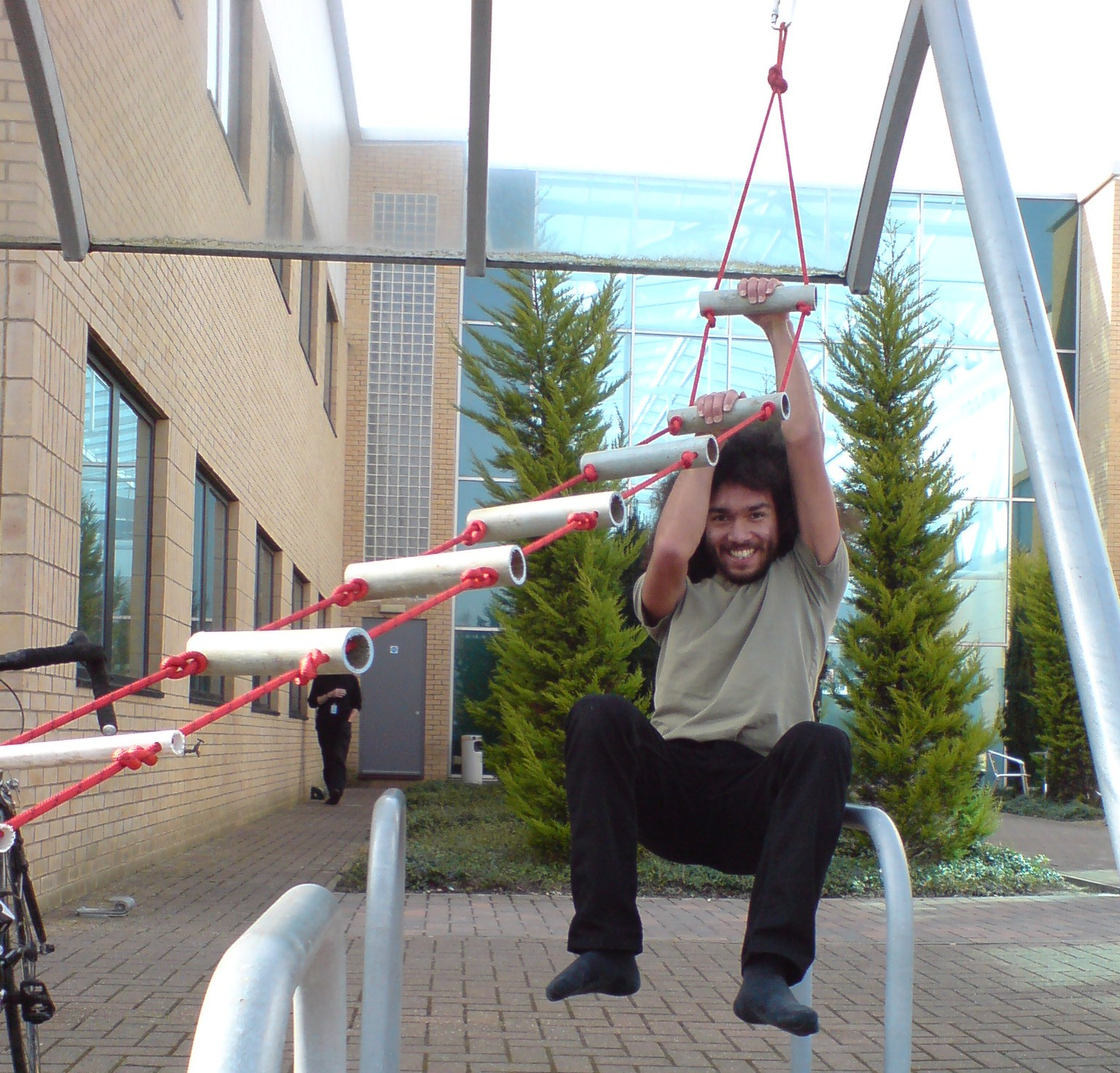
Bachar ladder

A piece of training equipment used to improve campusing and core body and arm strength; invented by John Bachar.
back-clipping
A hazardous mistake of clipping the rope into a quickdraw so the leader's end runs underneath the quickdraw as opposed to over the top of it; if the leader falls, the rope may fold directly over the gate, causing it to open and fail.
back-step

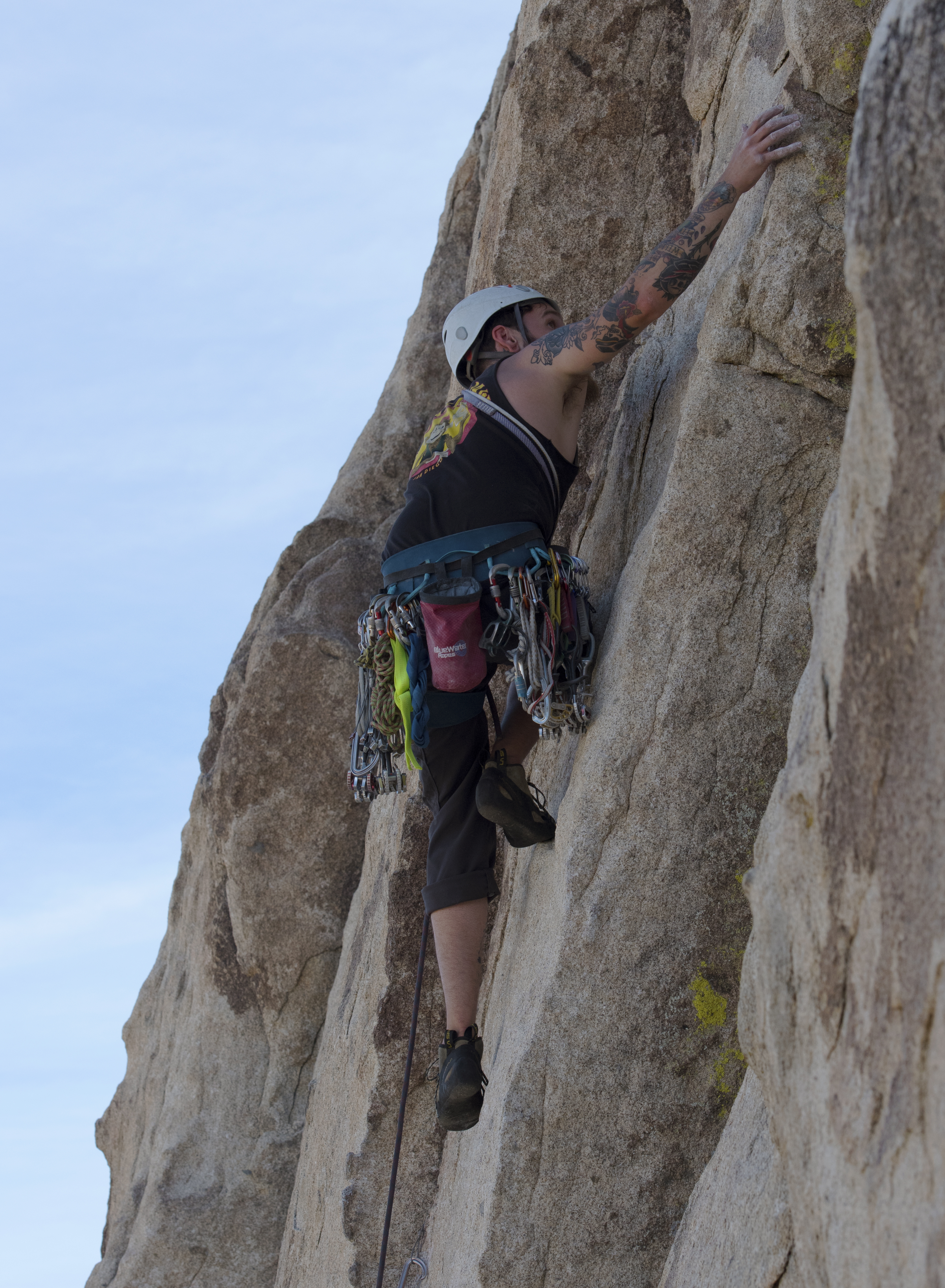
A back-step

Stepping on a hold where the outside edge — little toe side — of the shoe touches the rock.
bail
To retreat from a climb.
ball nut
A type of protection device consisting of a nut and a movable ball used for very small thin cracks.
barn-door

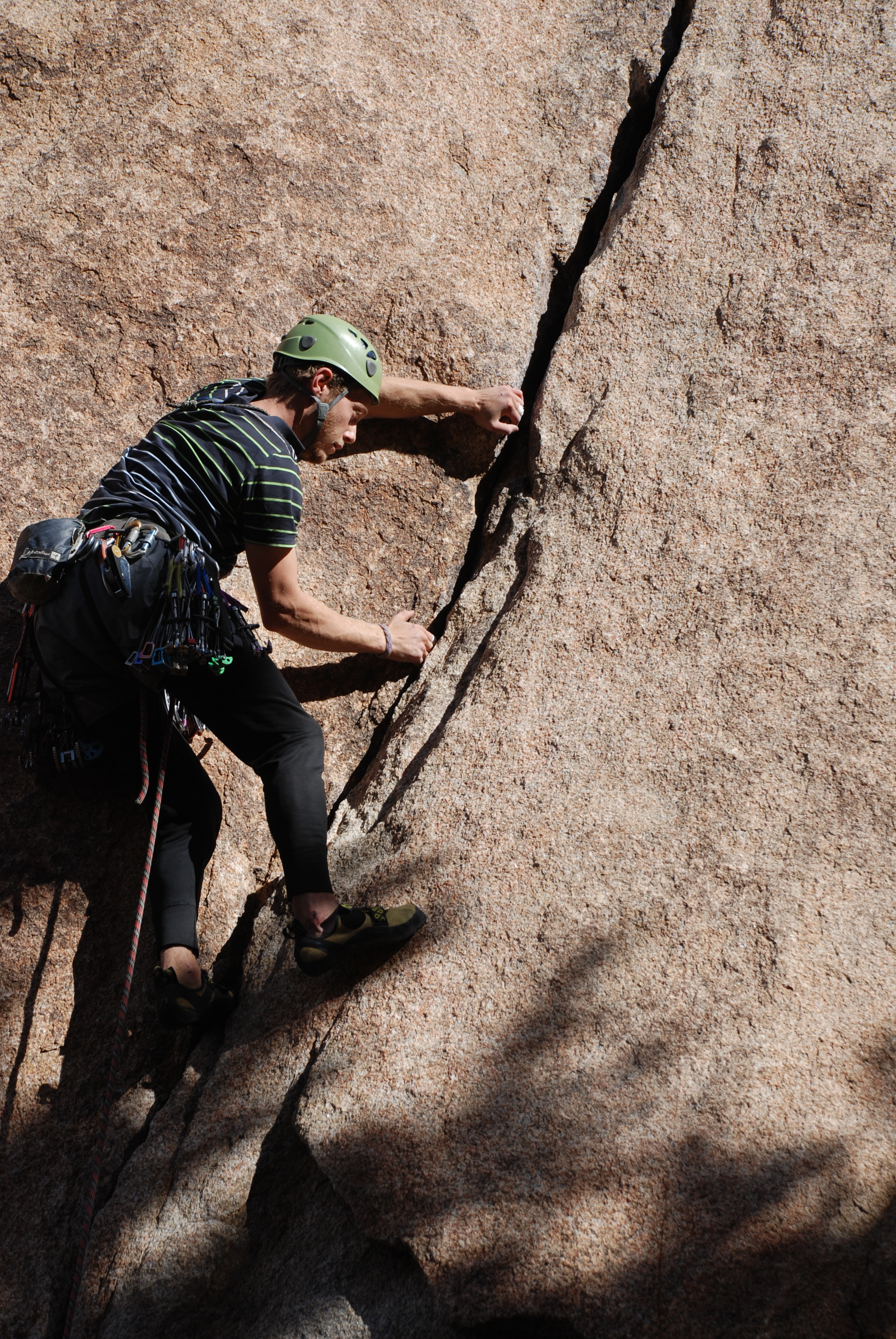
A potential barn door swing to the right

When all four points of contact are on a straight axis, the body can swing uncontrollably on this axis. See flagging.
bashie
See copperhead.
bat hang

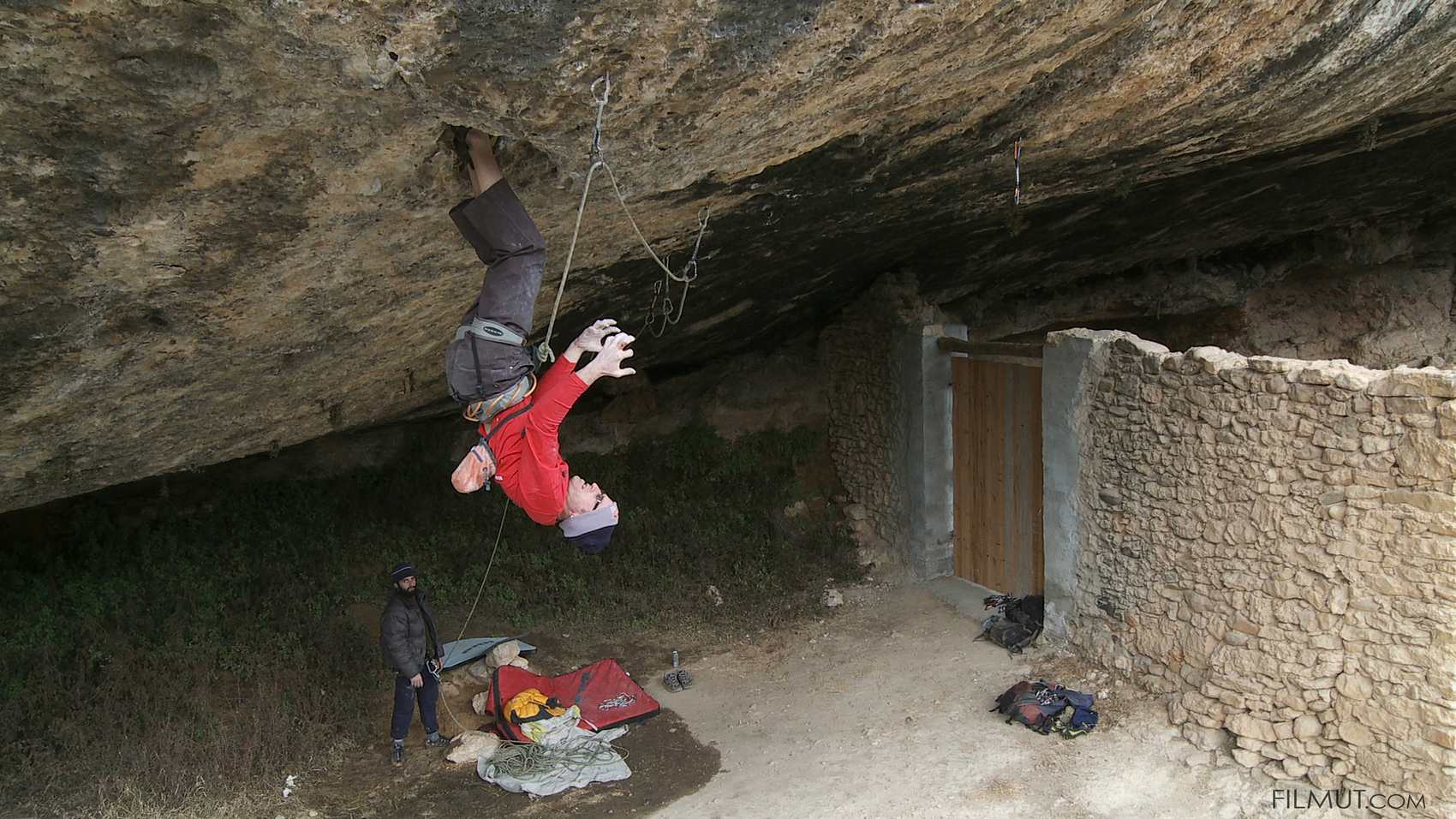
Using a bat hang

Where a climber gains a brief upside-down rest by hanging from their wedged feet. See chest jam and knee bar.
belay
To protect a roped lead climber from falling by controlling the rope; usually involves a belay device.
belayer
The person belaying the lead climber, also known as a second.
belay device
A mechanical device used by belayers to increase braking force when belaying; can be passive like a figure eights or tubers, or a more active assisted braking device like the Petzl GriGri.
belay glasses
Glasses that are worn by the belayer to help them avoid having to look upward, which can cause neck strain.
belay gloves

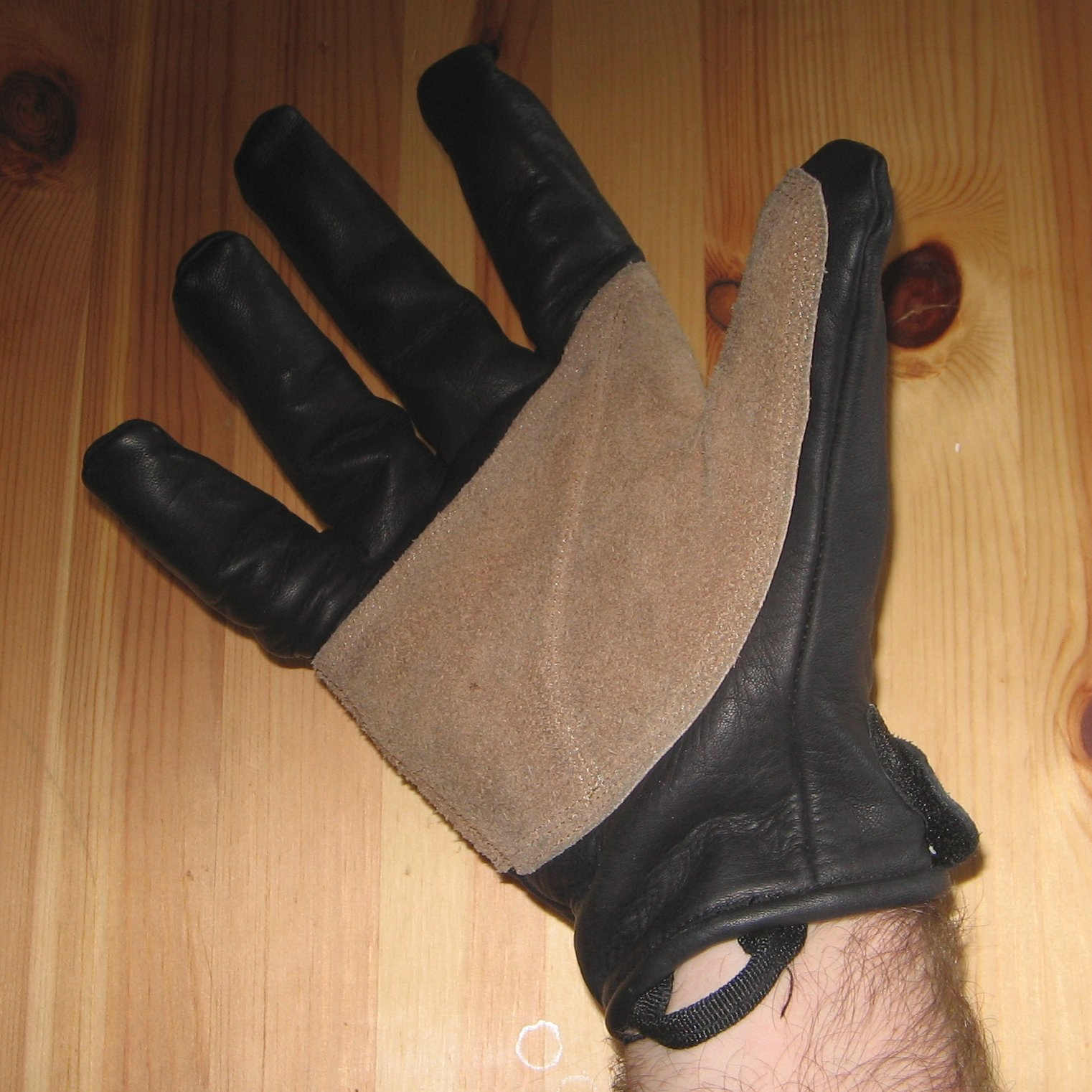
Belay glove

Gloves that are worn by the belayer to protect their skin in the event of sudden rope movement and to aid grip.
belay loop
The strongest point on a climbing harness, and the loop to which a belay device is physically attached.
belay off
A climbing command from a belayer to confirm that the friction of belaying has been removed from a climbing rope. It is a standard response to a climber's "off belay" request.
belay on
A climbing command from a belayer to confirm that the friction of belaying has been (re)applied to a climbing rope. It is a standard response to a climber's "on belay" request.
belay station

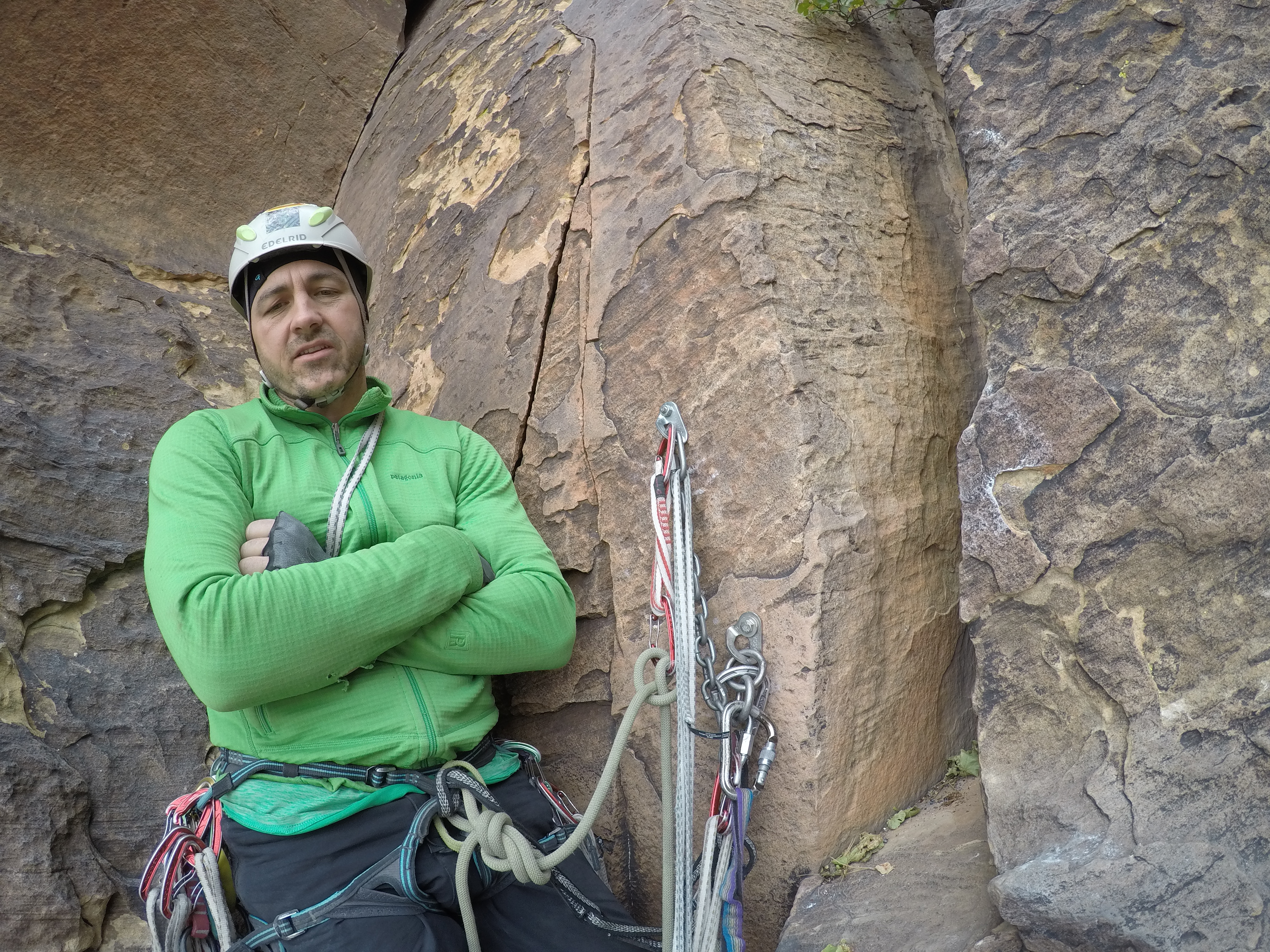
Bolted belay station

The place from which a belayer is belaying, sometimes anchored to the ground, or directly to the rock (particularly in a hanging belay on big wall climbing routes), or other objects.
bergschrund
A crevasse that forms on the upper portion of a glacier where the moving section pulls away from the headwall.
beta
Information on how to complete (or protect) a particular climbing route. See on-sight and flash.
beta break
In sport climbing, a move on a climbing route other than the move originally intended by the route setter. In bouldering, a move other than the move usually used on the boulder.
beta flash
See flash.
bicycle
A rock-climbing technique for overhangs where the feet "pinch-hold" a foothold by one foot pushing down on it while the other foot pulls up on it (i.e. like the pedals on a bicycle).
Big Bro

A hollow telescopic tubular device manufactured by Trango for use as protection in off-width crack climbing.
big wall climbing

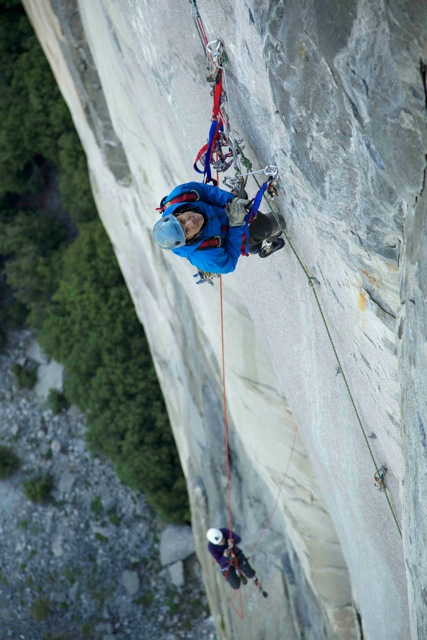
Big wall climbing

A long sustained sheer exposed rock climb with at least 6–10 pitches (over 300–500 metres), that typically takes over a day (if not many days), and requires the hauling of food, water, sleeping bags, and the use of portaledges.
bivouac

A crude overnight camp or shelter on a climbing route; on a sheer vertical wall, a portaledge can be used.
bivy-bag
A lightweight garment or sack offering full-body protection from wind and rain, which is used in a bivouac.
body belay

Where the belayer uses their body, and not a mechanical belay device, to increase braking force when belaying; usually involves wrapping the rope around their waist or hip.
boinking
A sport climbing technique to get back onto the wall after falling by pulling on the rope to un-weight it, allowing the belayer to take in the slack quickly; avoids the fallen climber having to return to the ground.
bollard

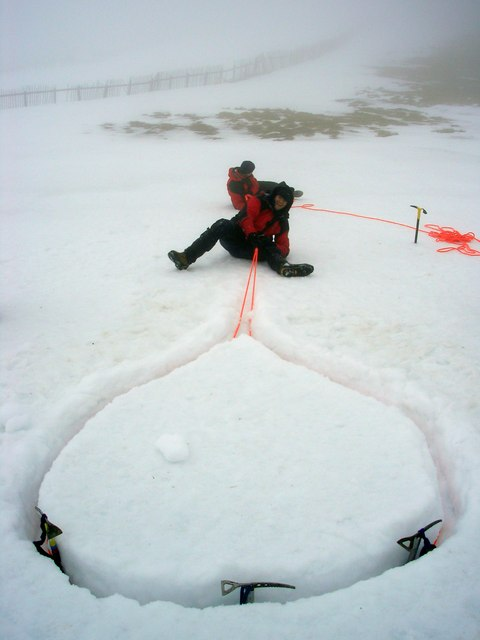
Snow bollard

A large block of rock or ice that is used as an anchor to construct a belay.
bolt
A point of protection permanently installed in a hole drilled into the rock, to which a metal bolt hanger is attached, with a hole to attach a carabiner or a quickdraw; used in sport climbing and in competition climbing.
bolt chopping
The deliberate removal of bolts from a climb; happens on traditional climbing routes (e.g. the Indian Face); also featured in the "bolt wars" of the 1980s and 1990s in the US.
bolt ladder
Sequence of bolts that are so close together, they can be used by aid climbers as a ladder.
bolt hanger

A piece of metal that is pre-attached to a bolt (i.e. before the bolt is screwed in) into which quickdraws can be clipped.
bolt runner
A term to describe a bolt that has no bolt hanger; will require a rivet hanger to be used by a climber.
bomb-proof

A highly secure anchor, or a particularly solid handhold or foothold.
bosun's chair
A type of larger harness to give a climber relief from bearing a constant load via their climbing harness.
bouldering
A type of climbing on large boulders less than 20 feet (6.1 m) high with only crash pads and spotting for protection.
bouldering mat

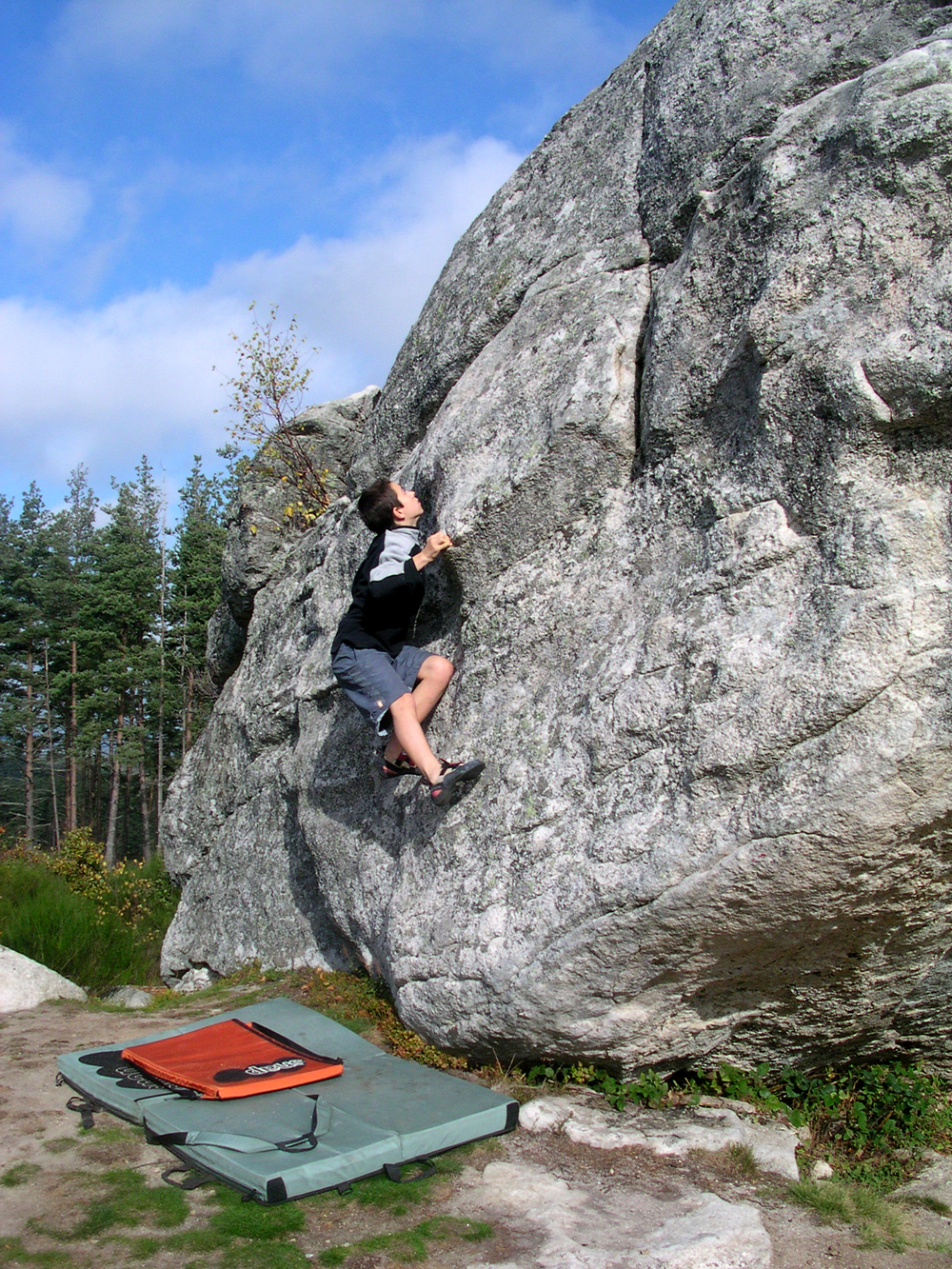
Bouldering mat

A thick foam pad used for protection when bouldering; also called a crash pad.
bounce test
A technique in aid climbing where a new placement is tested by using the lead climber's bodyweight.
Also recommended for questionable abseil stations testing.
bowline on a bight
A knot that makes a pair of fixed-size loops in the middle of a rope.
bridging
See stemming.
bucket
A large handhold that is very easy to use.
buildering
The practice of climbing on buildings, which is often illegal.
buttress

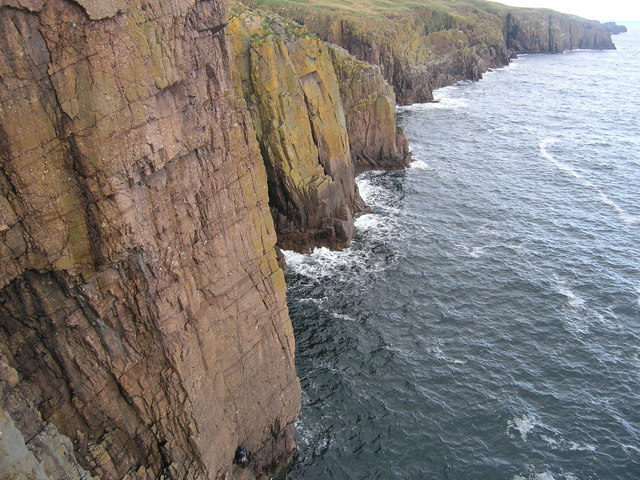
Large buttresses

A prominent rock feature that juts out from the rock face or from the mountain.

== C ==
C-grade

The technical difficulty grading system for aid climbing that is "clean" (i.e. no hammered pitons or bolts), which goes: C0, C1, C2, C3, C4, and C5; also has an A-grade equivalent of the "original" aid grades for "new wave".
cam
A spring-loaded camming device (SLCD), also known as "friends", used as protection in traditional climbing.
camalot
A brand of spring-loaded camming device (SLCD), manufactured by Black Diamond Equipment.
campusing

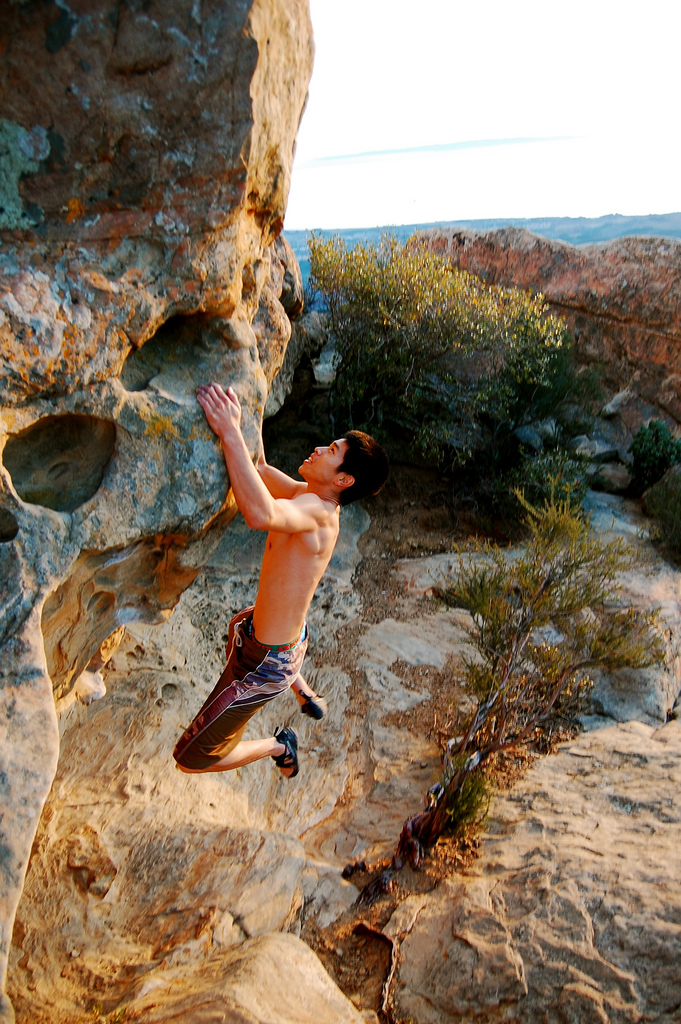
Climber campusing

Ascending a route without using the feet; is done on overhanging routes or on a campus board. See paddling.
campus board
A piece of training equipment used to build finger strength and strong arm lock-offs.
carabiner

An aluminum loop with a spring-loaded gate used to attach various load-bearing climbing devices together.
carrot bolt

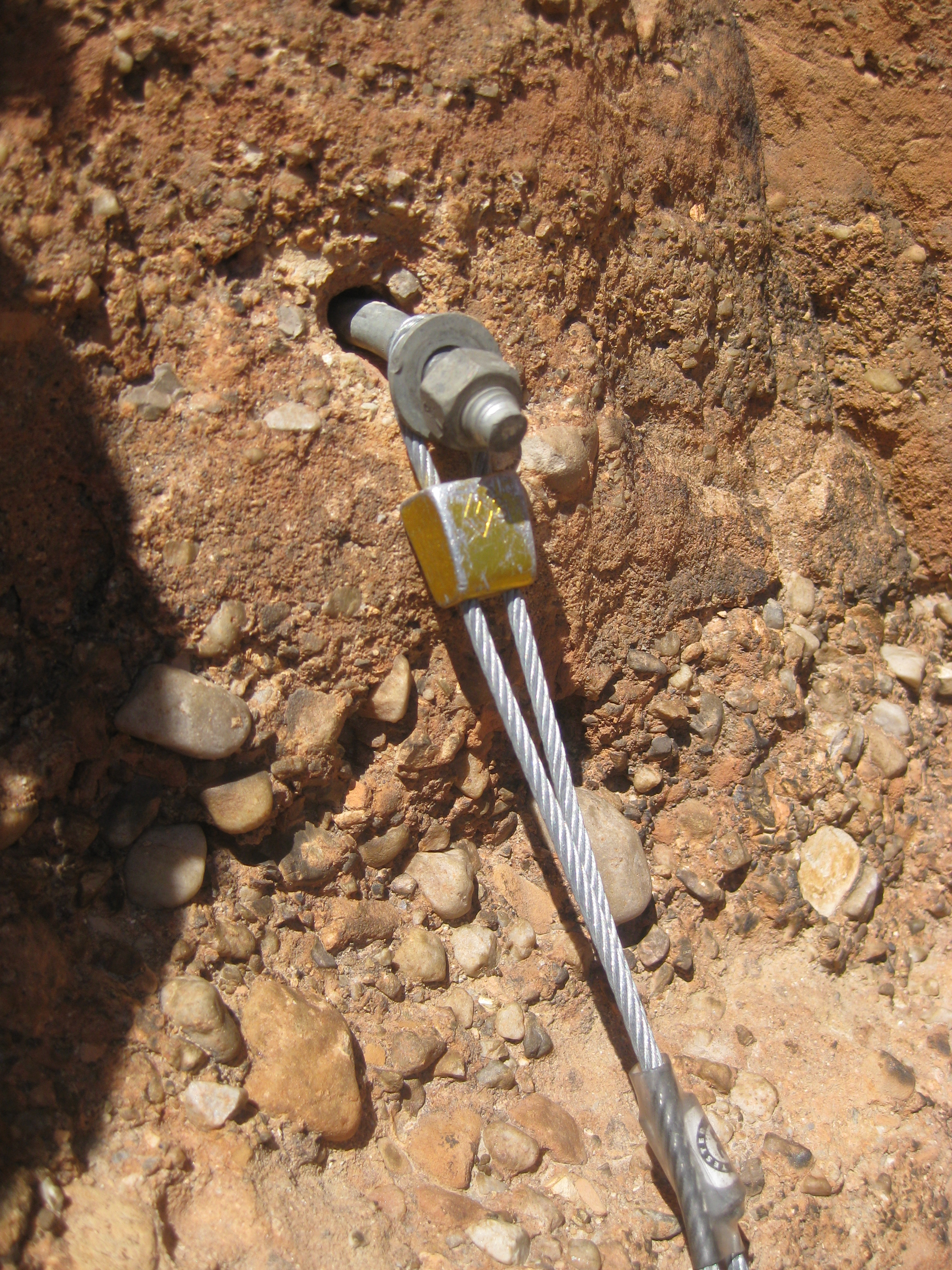
Carrot bolt with nut

An Australian term for a metal hex-headed machine bolt that functions like a bolt but with no fixed bolt hanger; climbers attach to the carrot bolt by using a version of a rivet hanger or by attaching a removable bolt hanger plate.
chalk
Gymnastic magnesium carbonate chalk that is used to reduce moisture, improve friction, and mark holds.
chalk bag

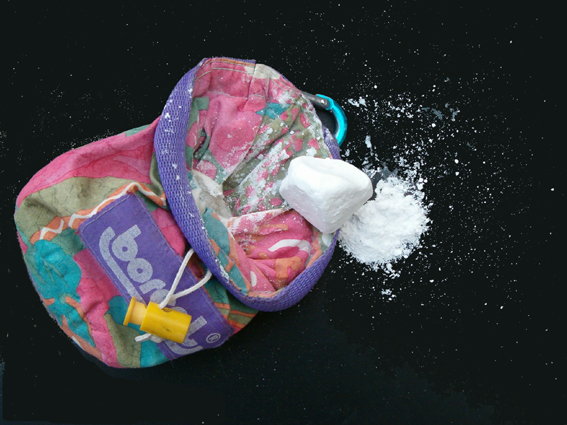
Chalk and chalk bag

A hand-sized holder for climbing chalk that is carried on a chalk belt or clipped to a harness.
chest harness
Type of harness that also covers the upper body to help prevent a rotation in any fall; particularly used when the climber is carrying a heavy pack, or is climbing in an area with crevasses.
chest jam
Jamming the torso into a wide crack, especially to allow the climber to rest.
chicken bolt
Term in big wall climbing and aid climbing to refer to a bolt placed to reduce the risk of a difficult section.
chicken head

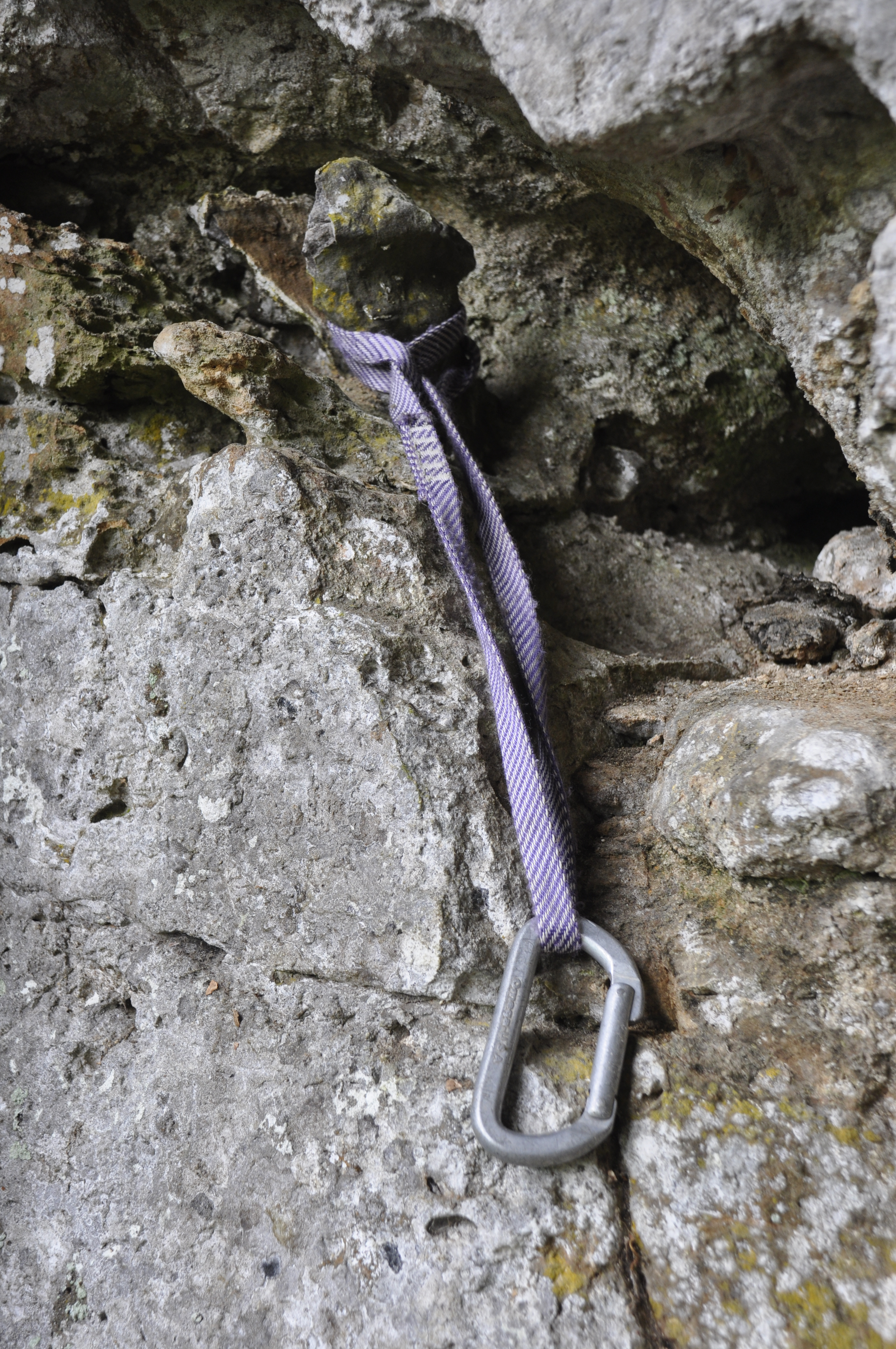
Tied chicken head

Knob or horn of rock narrowed at the base .
chicken wing
A crack climbing technique where a hand is placed on one side of the crack and the shoulder on the other.
chimneying

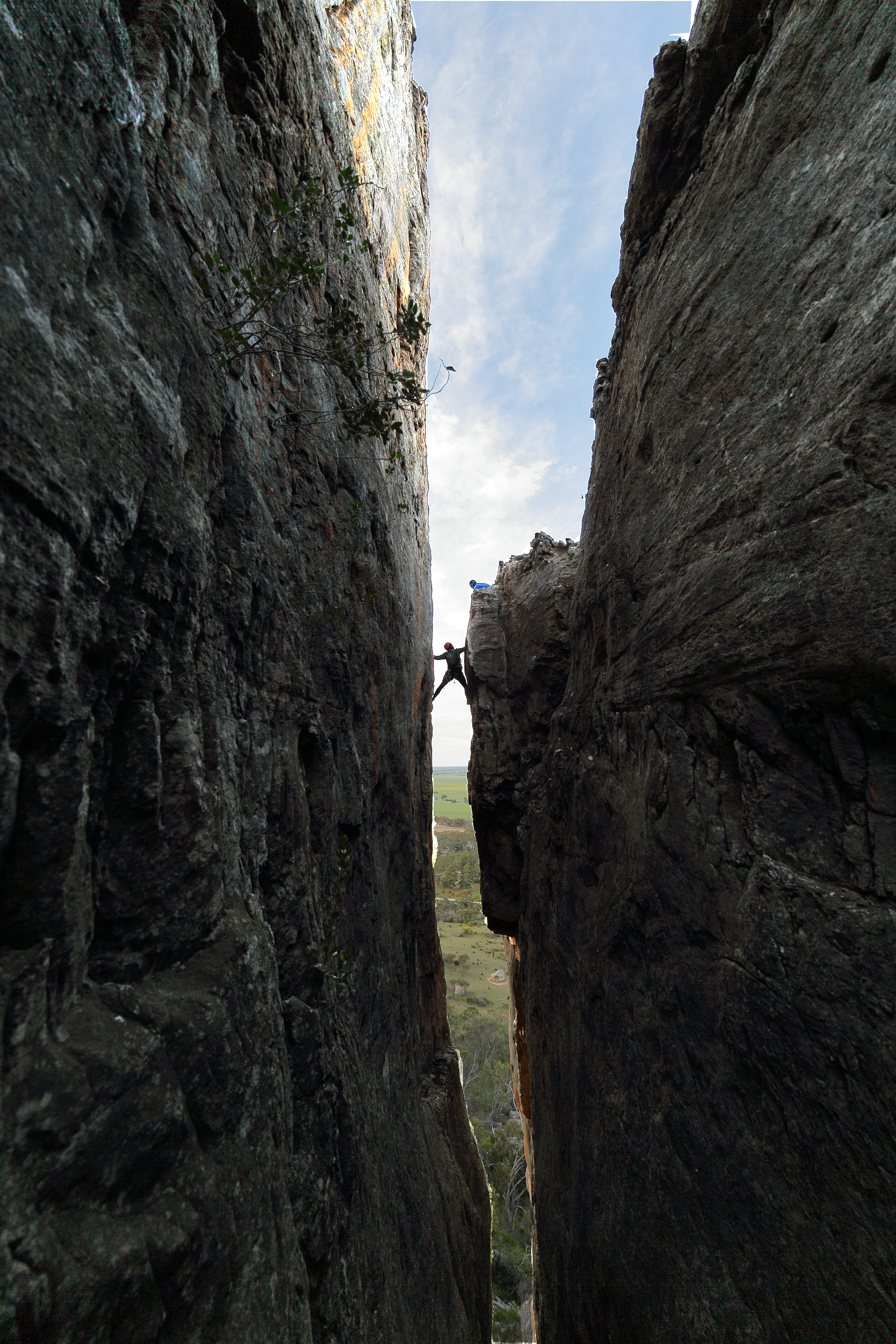
Chimneying

Rock-climbing technique for climbing a rock cleft with mostly parallel vertical sides, large enough to fit the climber's body. See stemming.
chipping
Improving a climbing hold by chipping the rock — is considered unethical and poor practice in climbing.
chock

A stone wedged in a crack that can be threaded to create a point of protection in traditional climbing.
chop route
British term for a traditional climbing route with very poor protection where any fall could be fatal. See X.
choss
Loose or "rotten" rock that makes for unpleasant, difficult, or dangerous climbing; useful for dry-tooling.
classification
See grade.
clean
1. To remove (or strip) protection equipment from a climbing route.
2. A route that is free of loose vegetation and rocks; vigorous cleaning can be chipping
3. To complete a climb without falling or resting on the rope. See redpoint.
clean aid climbing
A type of aid climbing where only removable traditional climbing protection is allowed, and no hammered-in bolts or pitons. See C-grade.
clean climbing
A broad movement that extended from the earlier free climbing movement, which advocated minimizing any form of climbing that permanently impacted the natural rock surface, such as the use of bolts or pitons in sport climbing.
cleaning tool

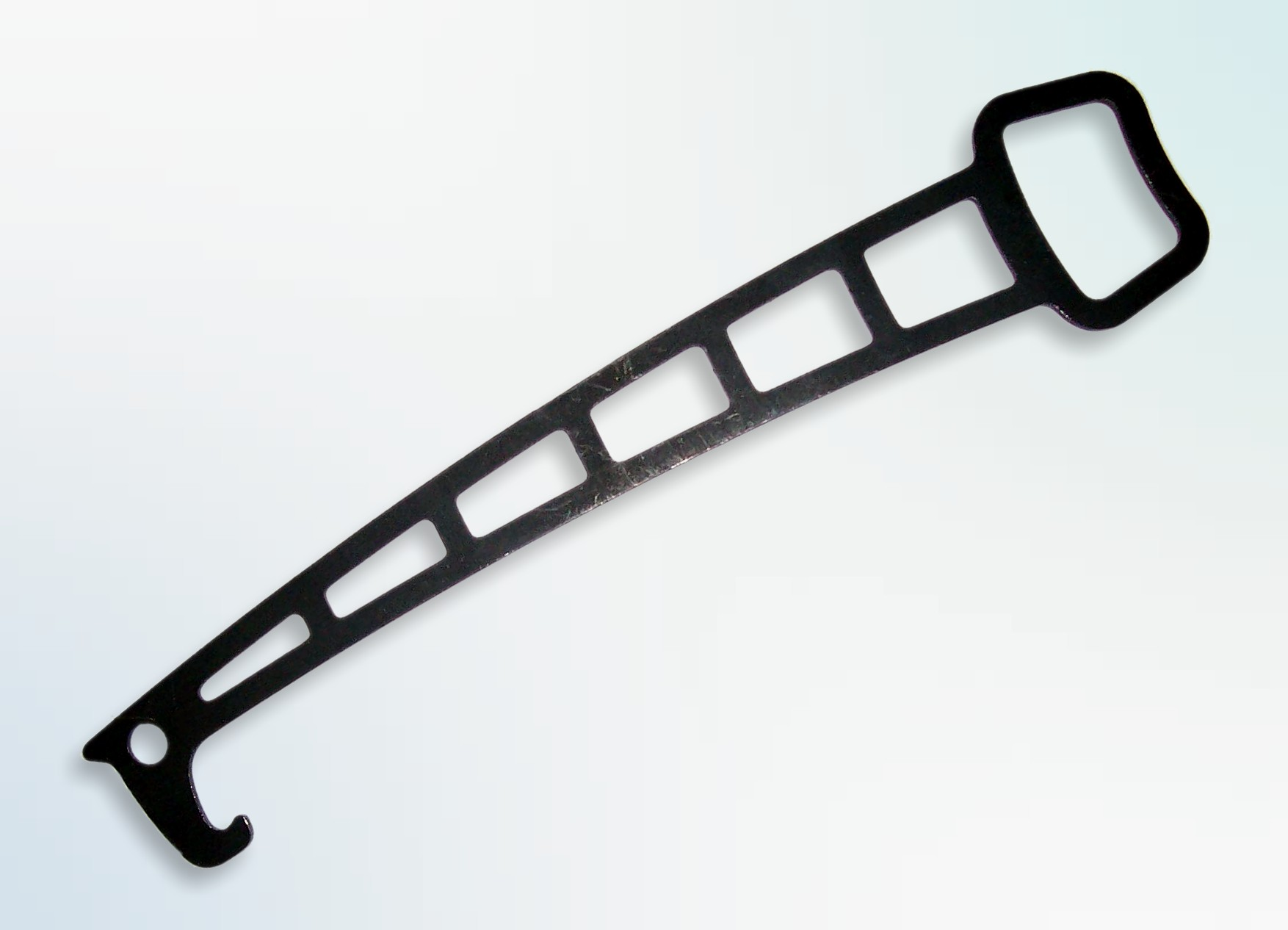
Cleaning tool

A device for removing jammed protection equipment, especially nuts, from a route.
climbing area
A region with numerous climbing routes. See crag
climbing command
A short phrase used for communication and instructions between a lead climber and a belayer. See take, belay off, belay on, on belay, off belay.
climbing gym
A specialized indoor climbing center; usually just called a "climbing centre" in the UK.
climbing peak
From German (Klettergipfel) a formation that can only be ascended by climbing.
climbing rope

General term for the wide range of specialized ropes that are used in all forms of climbing.
climbing route
A path by which a climber reaches the top of a mountain, a rock face or obstacle, or an ice-covered face or obstacle.
climbing shoe

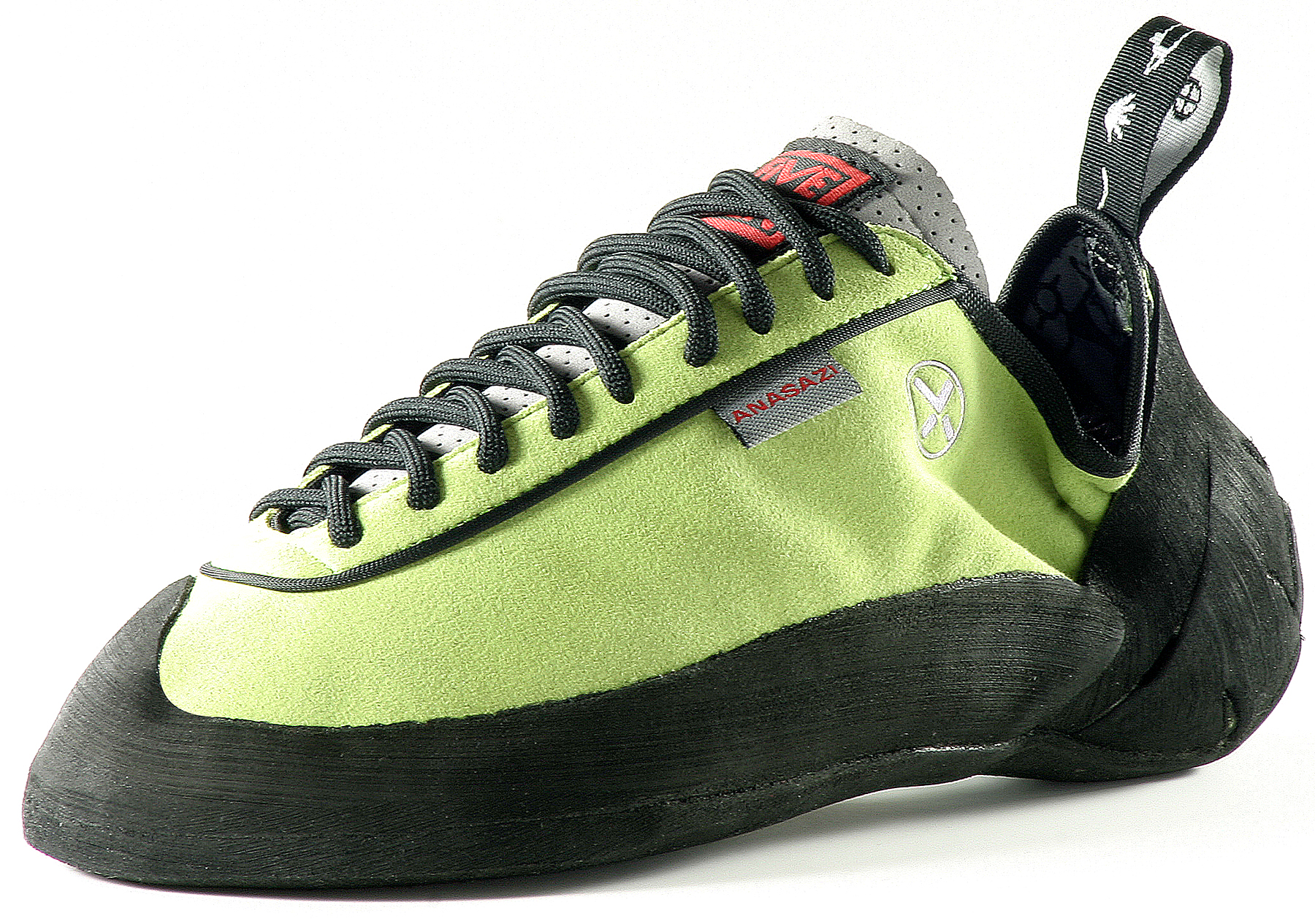
Climbing shoe

Footwear designed specifically for rock climbing that fits tightly and with sticky rubber soles for grip.
climbing wall
Artificial rock face that is typically housed indoors; is also used for competition climbing.
clip in

The process of attaching the rope to protection (usually via a carabiner), to belay devices, or to other anchors. See tie in.
clipstick
See stick clip.
competition climbing
A type of climbing held on climbing walls for mostly professional or Olympic climbers, split into the disciplines of lead climbing (on a bolted sport climbing route), bouldering and speed climbing. A fourth discipline of "combined" add the three together. See IFSC.
competition ice climbing
A type of ice climbing held on climbing walls for mostly professional ice climbers, split into the disciplines of ice lead climbing (on a bolted sport climbing dry-wall route), and ice speed climbing on an iced route. See also UIAA.
copperhead

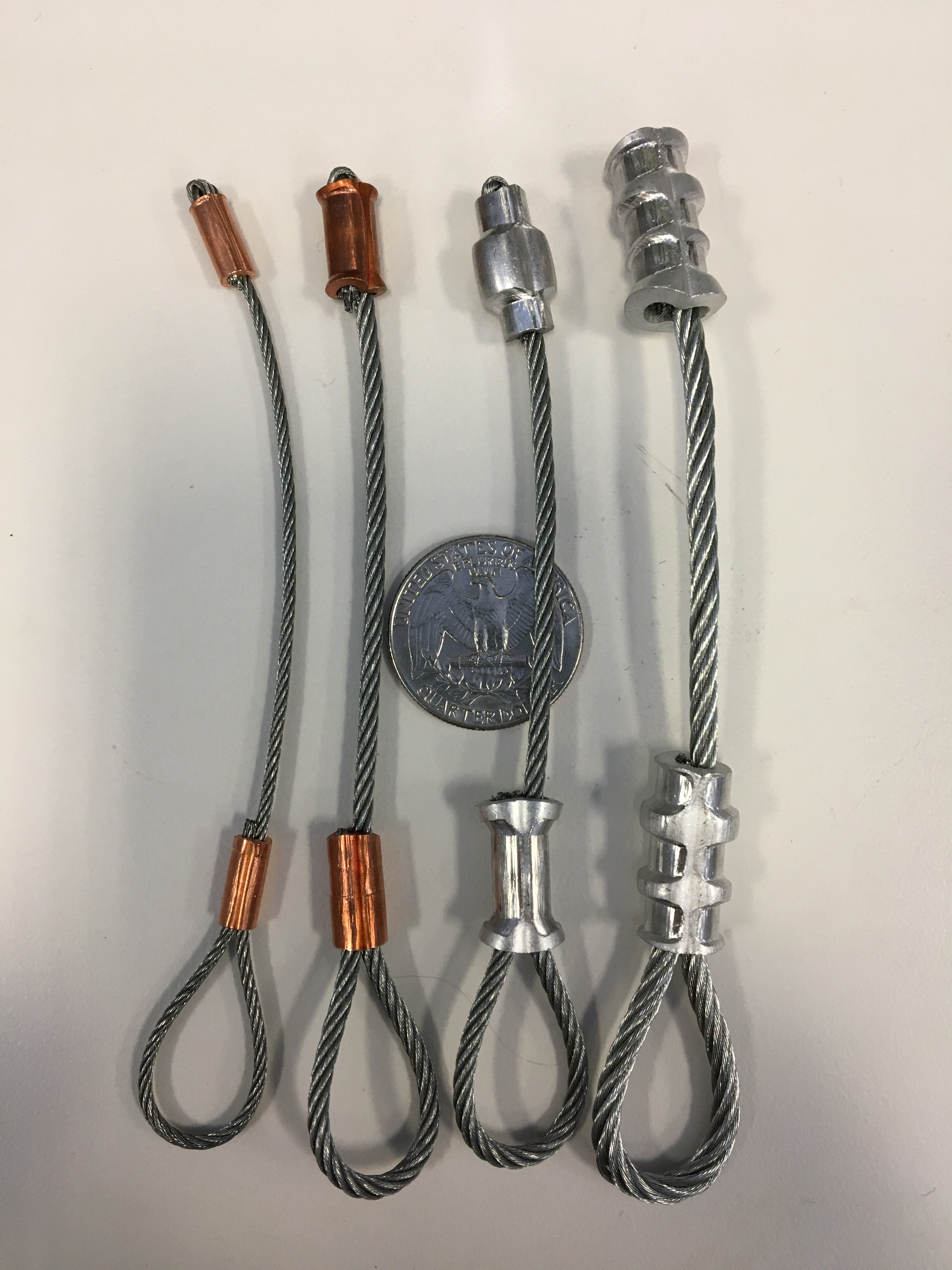
Copperheads

A small nut on a loop of wire with a head made of metal (often copper), soft enough to deform during placement, which is often with a hammer; commonly used in aid climbing as a point of placement, remaining fixed in-situ after placement.
cord

A short piece of thin climbing rope used for various purposes in climbing, including for creating abseil stations. See tat.
cord lock
A lock or toggle used to fasten cords with gloved hands. Used on most mountaineering gear.
cordelette

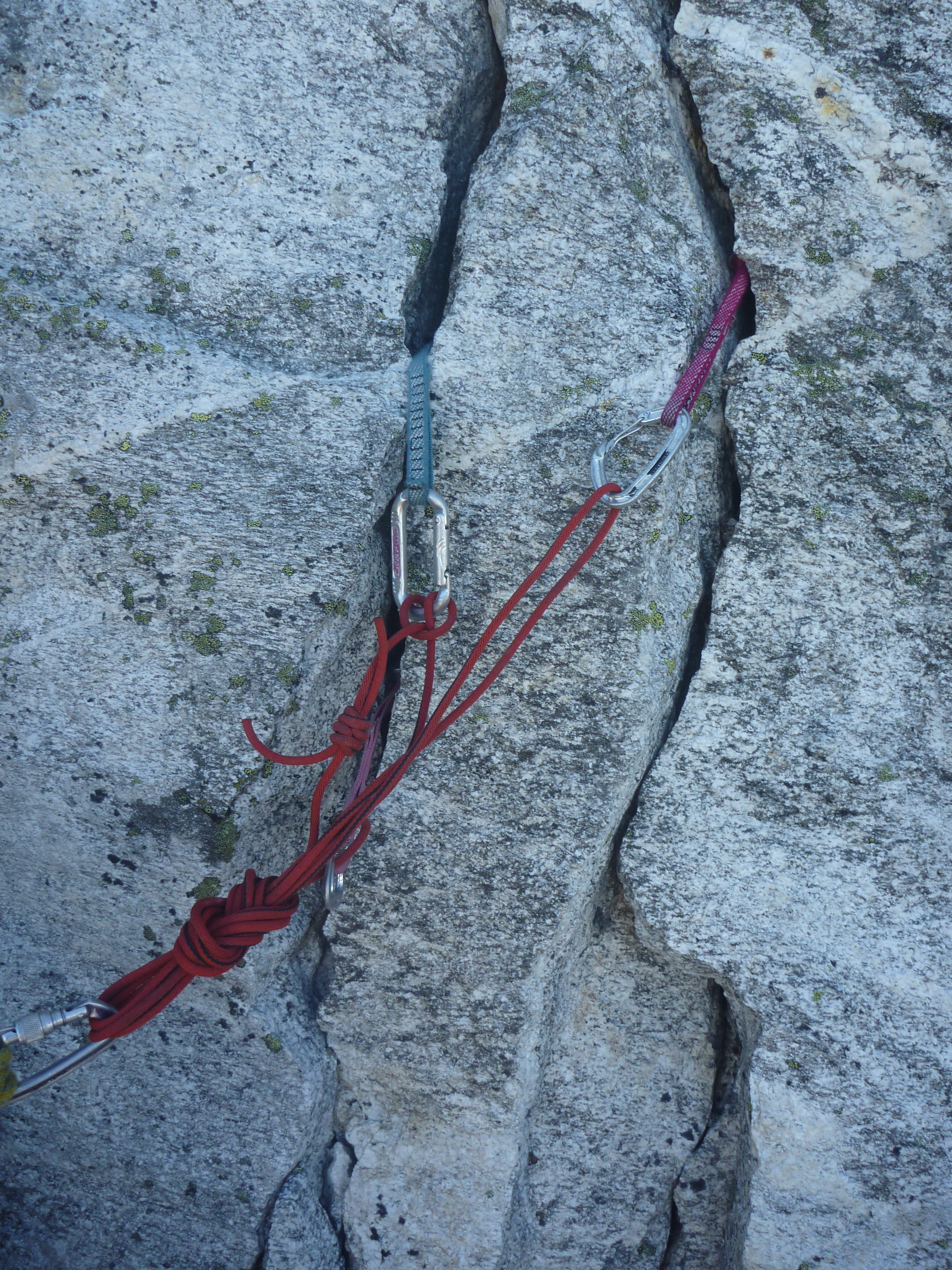
Cordelette

A loop of narrow (e.g. 5-7 millimetre) accessory perlon cord that is used to tie into multiple anchor points.
corner
An inside corner of rock, the opposite of an arête (UK). See dihedral.
cornice
An overhanging edge of snow on a ridge.
crack climbing
To ascend by wedging body parts into natural cracks in the rock. See jamming, chimney, and off-width.
crag
An expanse of rock that has a number of sport and/or trad climbing routes in close proximity. It may include single or multi-pitch climbing but differs from alpine climbing in ease of access and availability of rapid assistance in the event of a climbing accident.
crampons

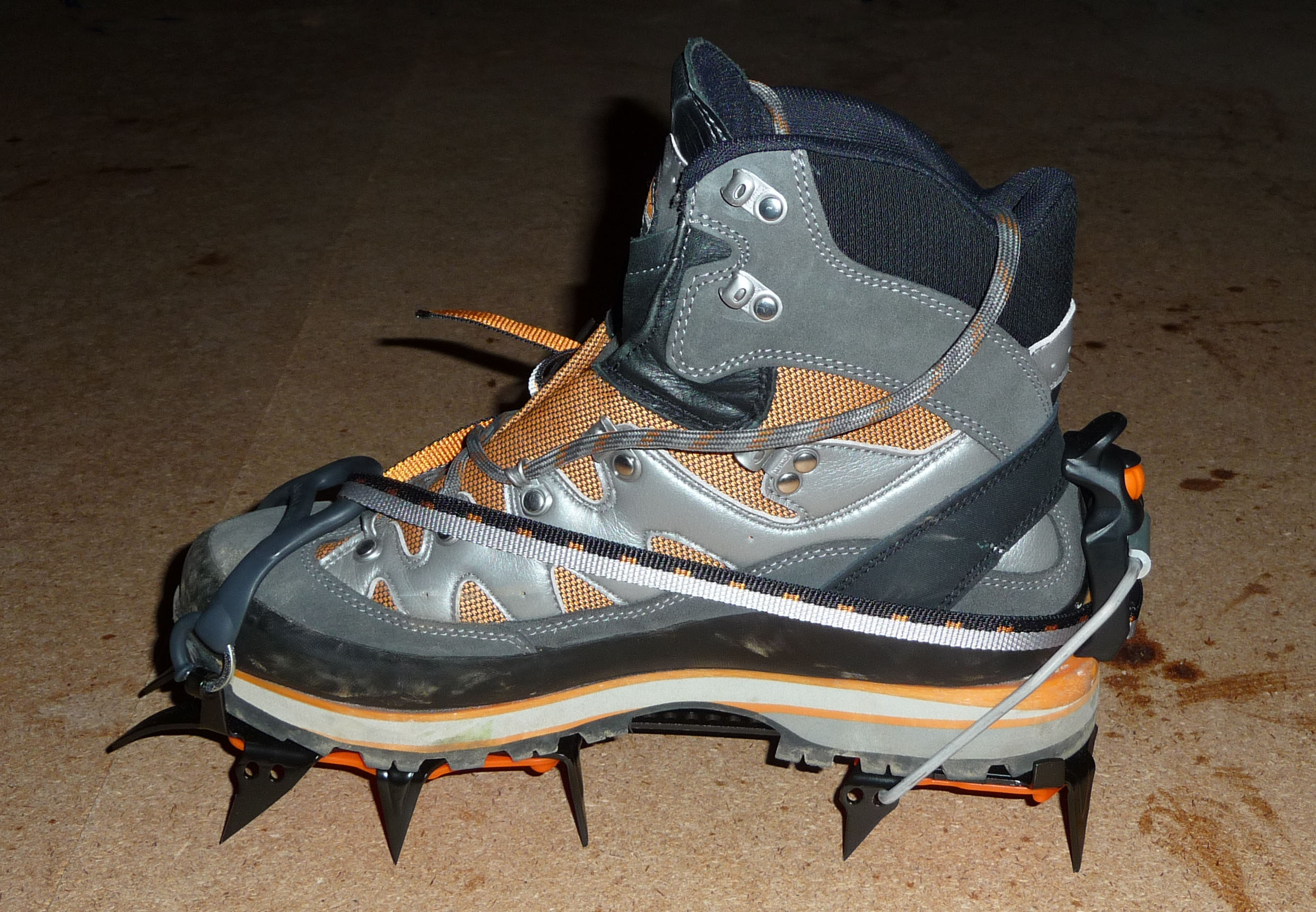
12-point crampons

A pair of metal frames with spikes that can be attached to boots to increase grip on snow and ice. See front pointing.
cranking
To pull on a climbing hold as hard as possible.
crash pad
See bouldering mat.
crater
See ground fall.
crimp

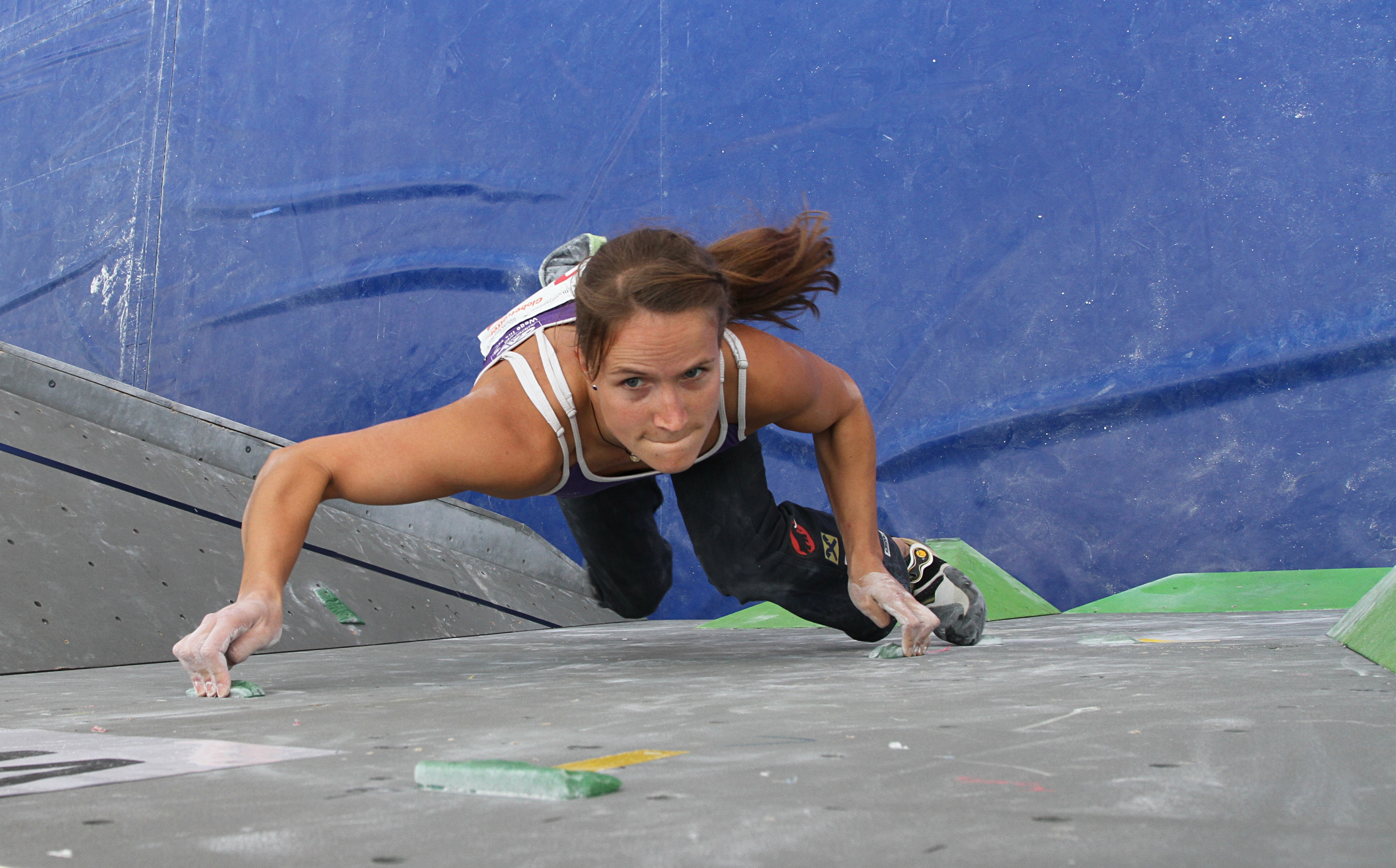
Cranking on crimps

A hold which is only just big enough to be grasped with the tips of the fingers.
crux
The most difficult portion of a climb; often the grade is defined by the difficulty of the crux.
cut-loose
When a climber's feet swing away from the rock on overhanging terrain and they hang by their hands.

== D ==
D-grade

Where mixed climbing routes are completed in fully dry conditions (i.e. no ice or snow), the "M" suffix of the M-grade is swapped for a "D".
dab
A term in bouldering for touching the ground, crash pad, spotter, or hold from other route.
daisy chain

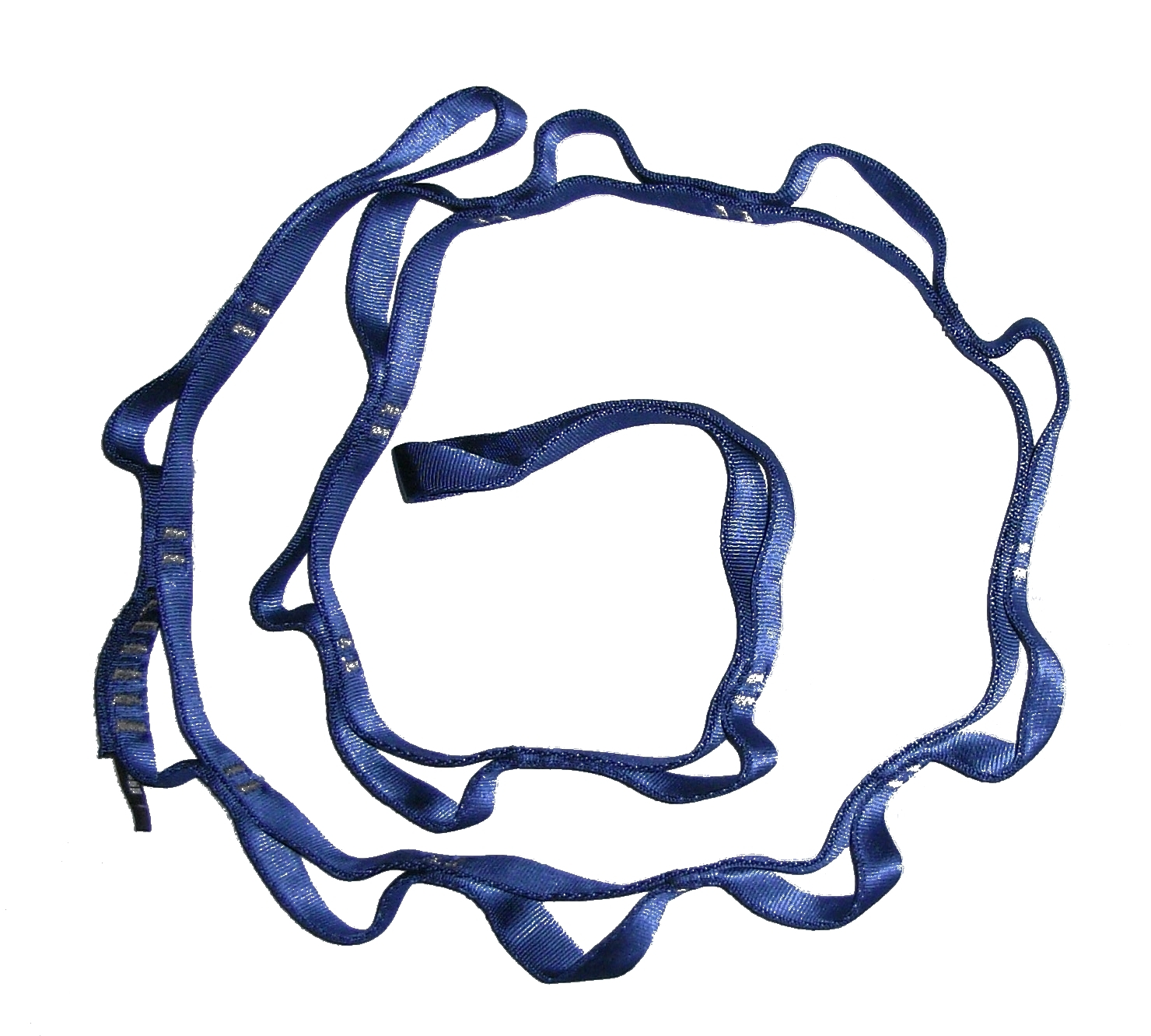
Daisy chain

A special-purpose type of sling with multiple sewn or tied loops, used in aid and big wall climbing.
dead hang

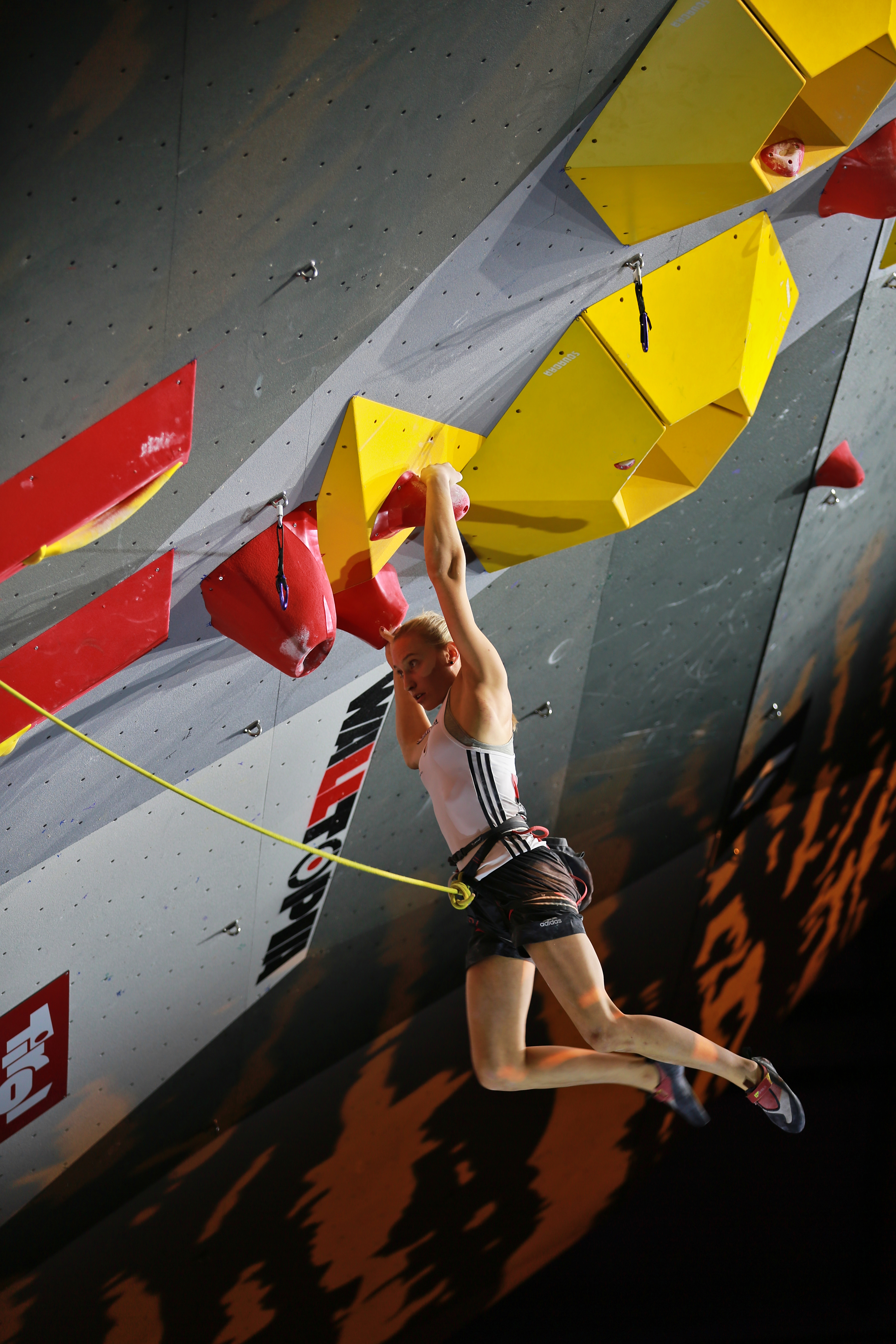
Dead hanging

When a climber hangs limp, such that their weight is held by arm ligament tension rather than by muscles.
deadman anchor

An object which lies horizontally, buried in the snow, serving as an anchor for an attached fixed rope.
deadpoint
A controlled dynamic motion in which the hold is grabbed with one hand at the apex of upward motion of the body, while one or both feet and the other hand maintain contact with the rock. See dynos.
deck
The ground below a climbing route (i.e they fell to the ground and "hit the deck"). See ground fall.
deep-water soloing

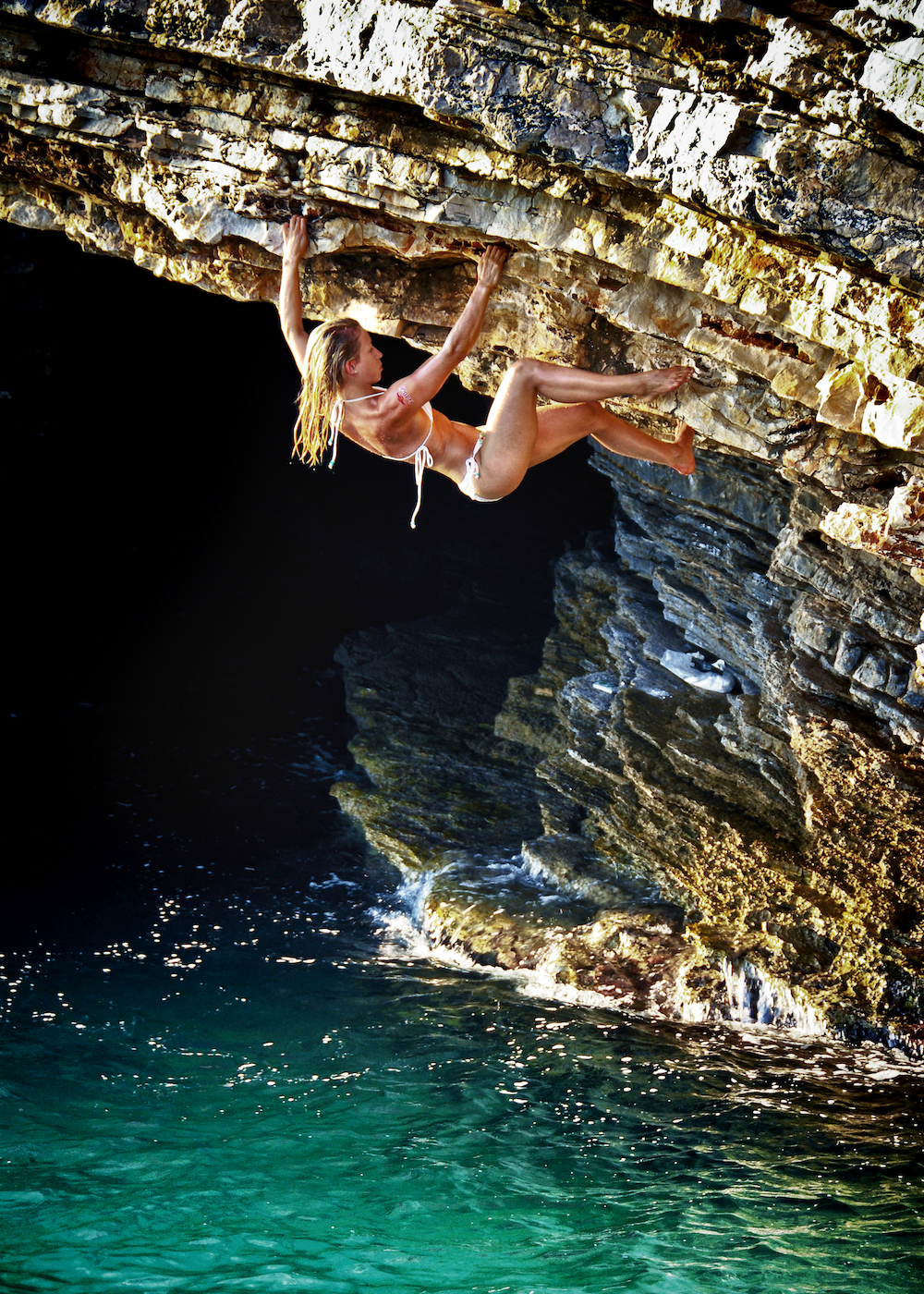
Deep-water soloing

Free solo climbing on an overhanging route over a body of water to absorb any fall.
descender

A mechanical device that enables a controlled descent on a fixed rope; belay devices can be descenders. A rack is another type of descender.
dexamethasone

A drug to treat high-altitude cerebral edema (HACE) and high-altitude pulmonary edema (HAPE).
dialled
To have a complete understanding of a particular climbing move or sequence of moves on a route.
Diamox
A drug used to inhibit the onset of altitude sickness; otherwise known as acetazolamide.
dihedral

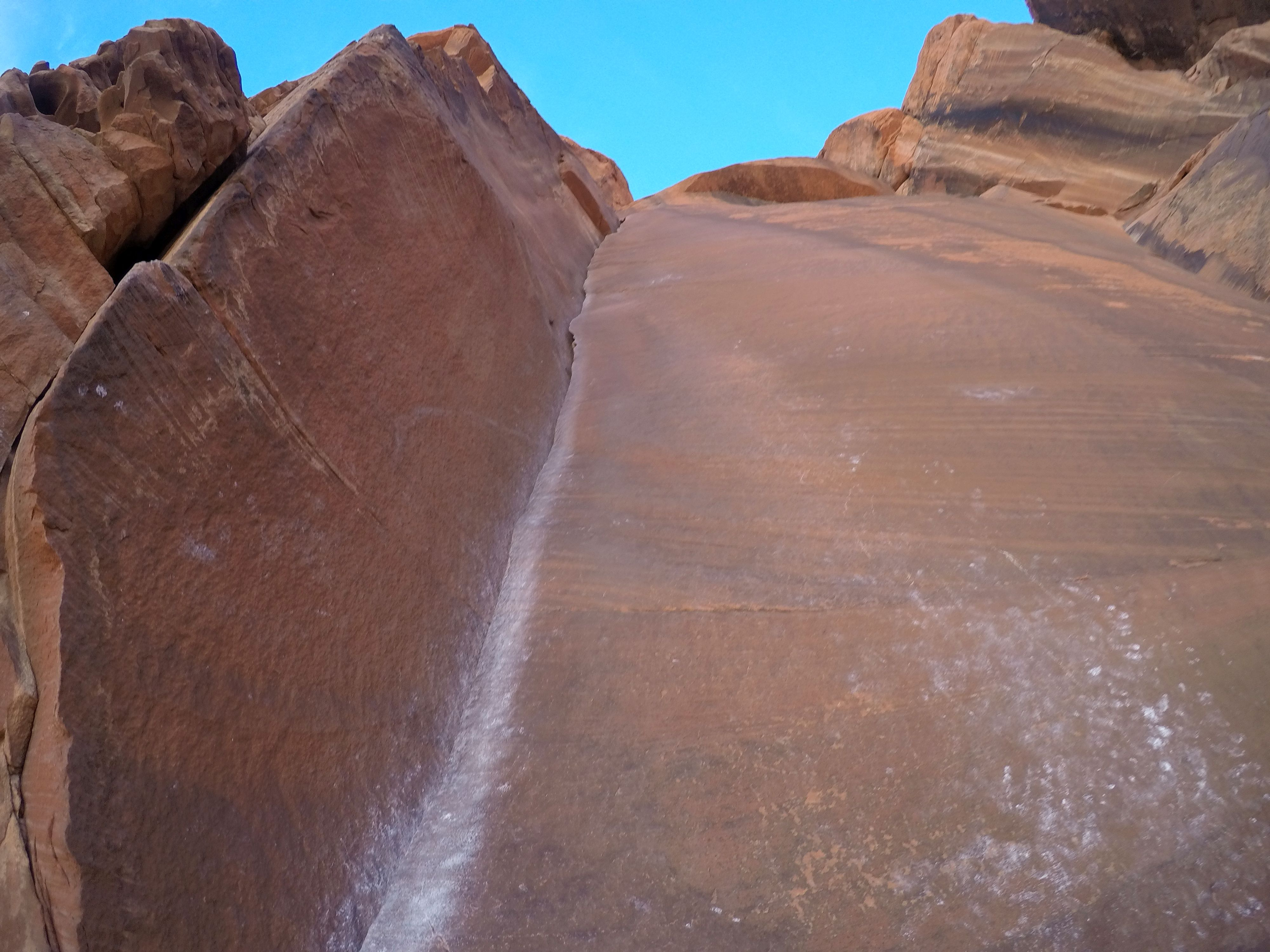
Dihedral

An open book-shaped corner formed at the intersection of two flat rock faces; the opposite of an arête.
direttissima
Italian for "shortest link", is the most direct route to the summit of a mountain up the fall line (e.g. the Brandler-Hasse Direttissima on the Cima Grande, Dolomites); origin of the term is often attributed to Emilio Comici who said: "I wish some day to make a route, and from the summit let fall a drop of water, and this is where my route will have gone".
direct start
A new variation of an existing rock climbing route that avoids detours taken before the main line is reached due to their greater difficulty (e.g. Suprême Jumbo Love as a direct start to Jumbo Love).
dirtbag
A climber who lives modestly and often itinerantly, to maximize the amount of time climbing. Practitioners included Jan and Herb Conn and Fred Beckey (from the film: Dirtbag: The Legend of Fred Beckey).
double ropes

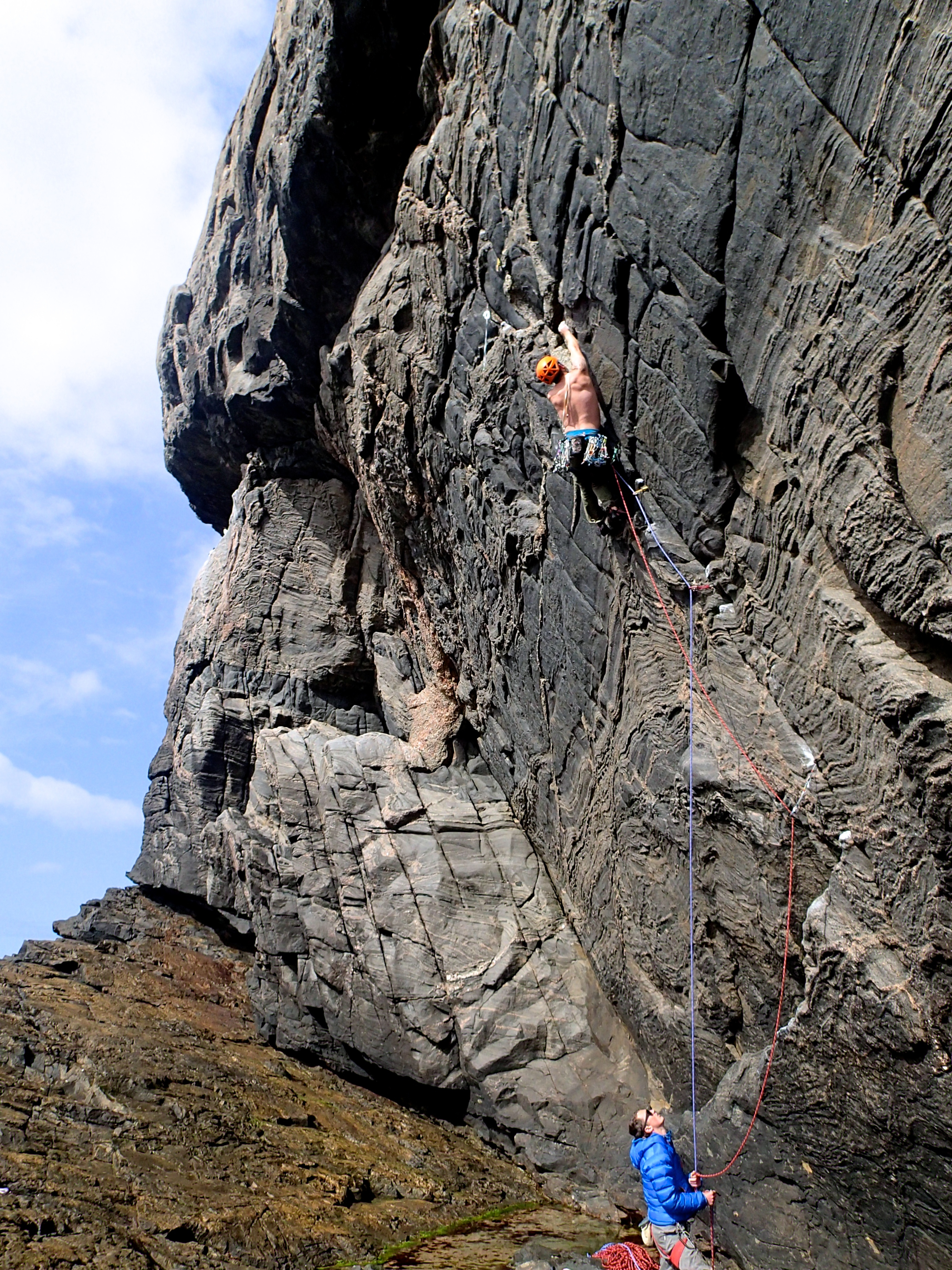
Using double ropes

In lead climbing where two thinner ropes are used instead of a single rope to manage rope drag. Compare twin ropes.
downclimb
To descend by climbing downward (rather than by abseiling or lowering off), after completing a climb, or bailing.
drag

Friction from the rope running over the rock and through the lower protection. See slack and double ropes.
drilled baby angle

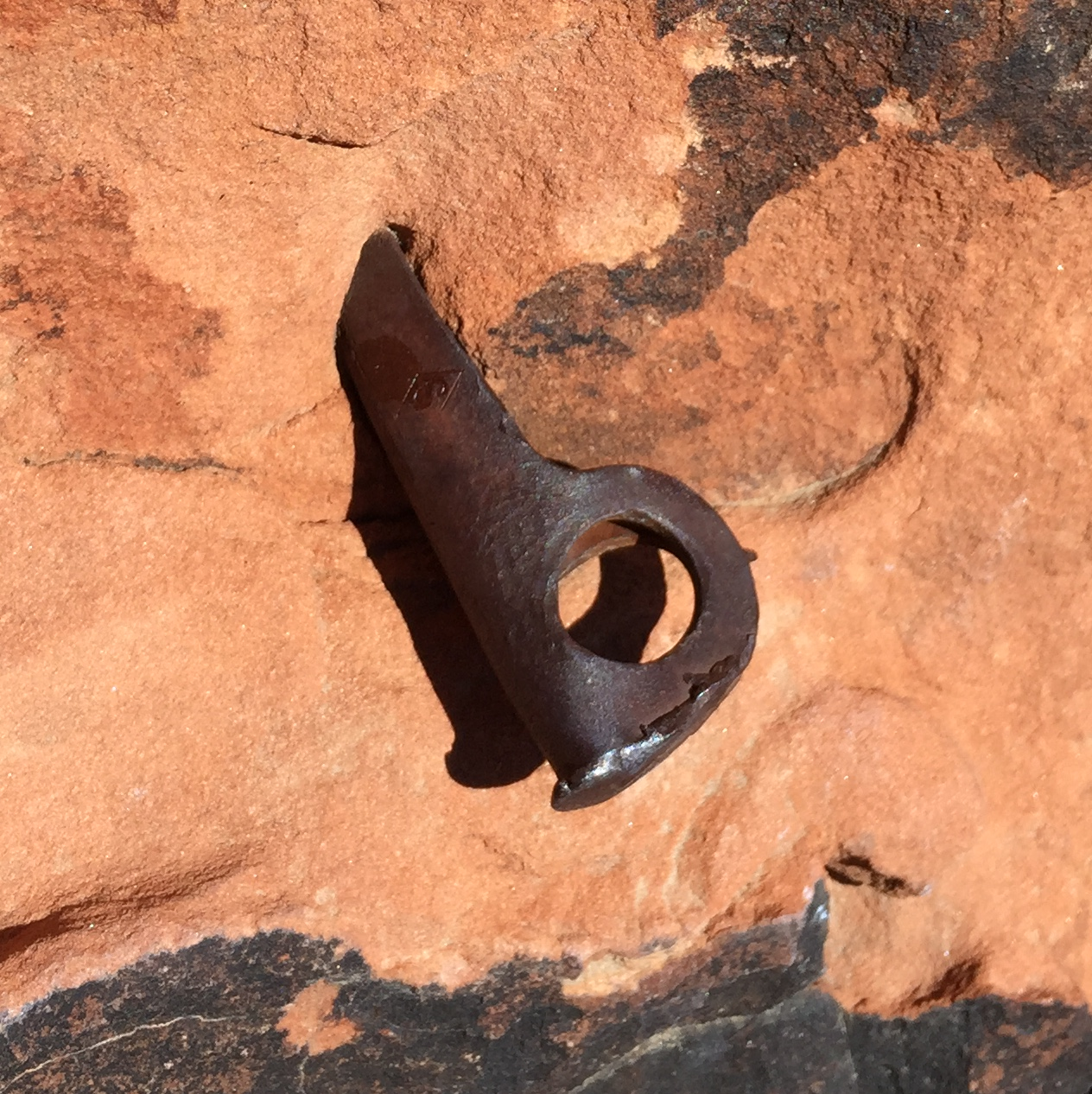
Drilled baby angle

A type of anchor used in soft rock instead of bolts that uses a "baby angle" (piton) hammered into a drilled hole, which some think is better in soft rock than bolts that can crack the rock.
drive-by
A deadpoint where one arm crosses over the other to reach a hold that is above and to the side.
drop knee

An advanced rock-climbing technique where the knee is dropped downwards to twist the hips—and the centre of gravity—closer to the rock face, thus increasing the amount of upward reach and torque available to the climber; the unique stresses on the knee can lead to serious injuries.
dry-tooling

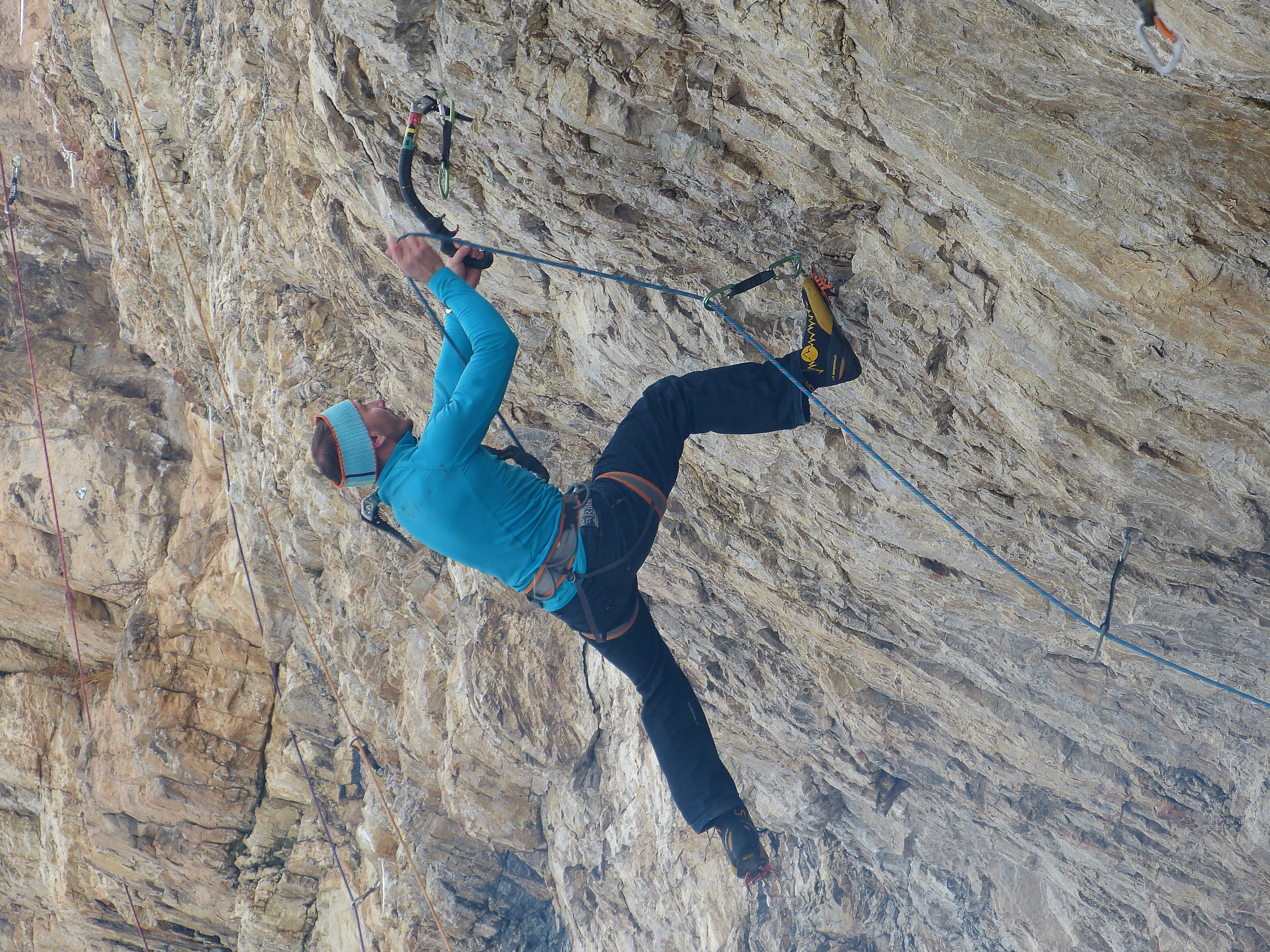
A climber dry tooling

Using ice climbing tools such as crampons and ice axes, on bare rock. See Mixed climbing.
Dry Tooling Style

Type of dry-tooling with additional restrictions and particularly a prohibition on yaniro moves.
Dülfersitz
A classical non-mechanical abseiling technique where the fixed rope is wrapped around the body.
dynamic rope
An elastic climbing rope that softens falls to some extent and absorbs the energy of heavy loads. Compare static rope.
dyno
In rock climbing, a dynamic jump or leap to grab an out-of-reach hold; failure to grab the hold will usually result in a fall. See also paddling and campusing.

== E ==
E-grade
Part of the British adjectival grading system that is used to rank the level of risk (a separate grade is given for technical difficulty) of traditional climbing routes, and which goes E1, E2, E3, ... to E11 (an additional metric is used for technical difficulty).
edging
A technique of using the edge of a climbing shoe on a narrow foothold; in the absence of footholds, smearing is used.
Egyptian
See Drop knee.
Egyptian bridging
The same position as bridging or chimneying, but with one leg in front and one behind the body.
eight-thousander
A mountain whose elevation exceeds 8,000 meters (26,247 ft) a.s.l., of which there are only 14 in the world.
eliminate
1. A bouldering move, or series of moves, where certain holds are placed "off bounds".
2. A British climbing term for a route that does not take the most obvious or direct line, and instead 'eliminates' the use of other features to create its line (e.g. not allowing the climber to use a nearby crack in making their ascent).
Elvis legs
See sewing-machine leg.
enchainment
A mountaineering term to describe linking-up several individual climbs to create a larger undertaking.
energy absorber

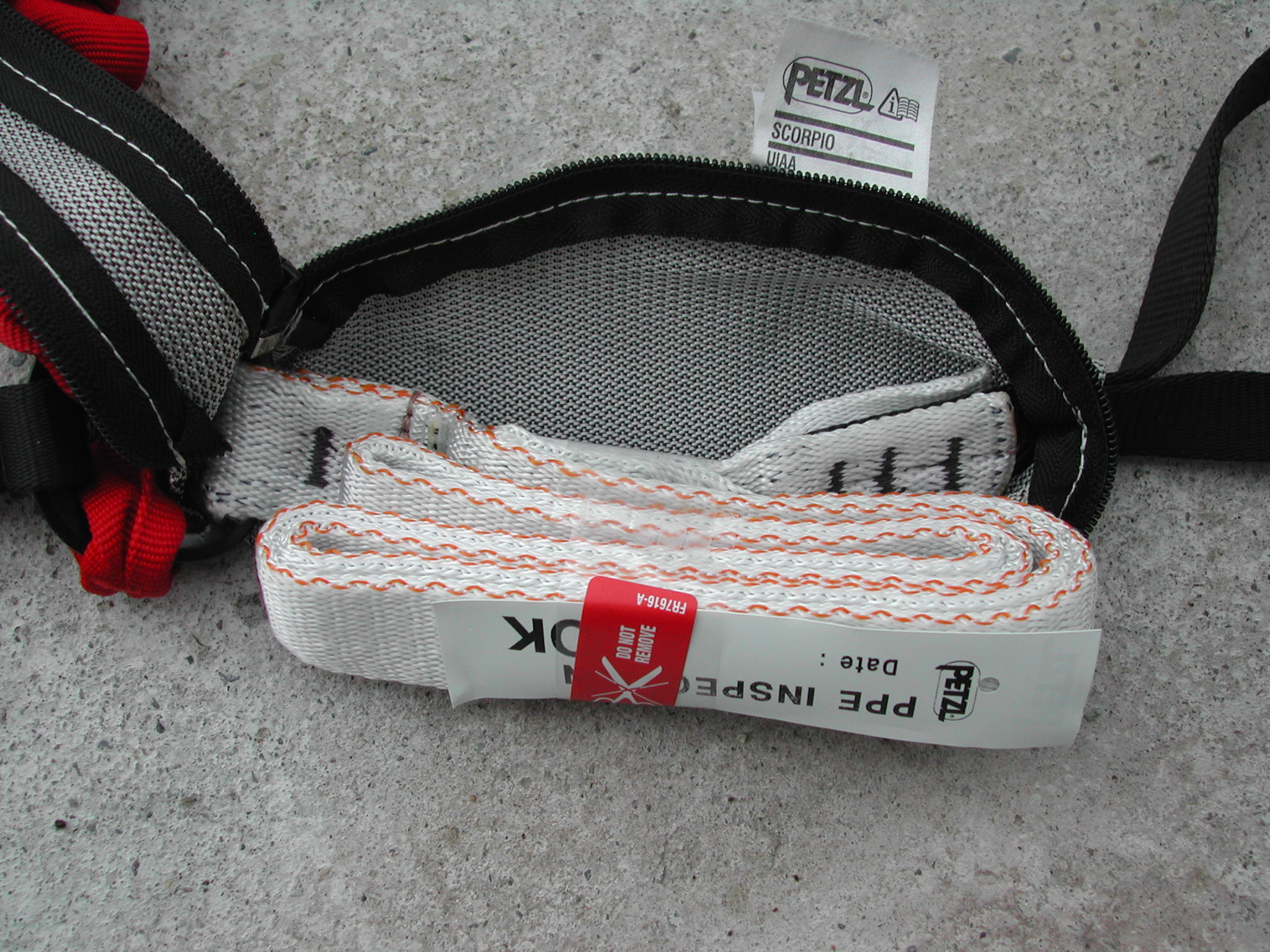
Energy absorber

A piece of protection equipment used in via ferrata climbing to absorb the energy of the arrest of any fall. See lanyard.
epic
An otherwise ordinary climb that turned into a major struggle.
ERNEST
An acronym for Equalised, Redundant, No Extension, Strong, and Timely, in building anchors. See SERENE.
etrier

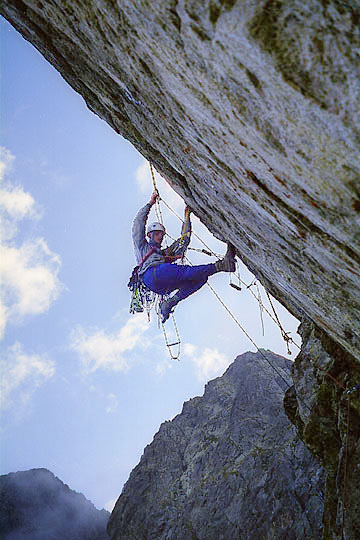
Using an etrier

A short ladder made of webbing that is used for aid climbing.
European death knot
A flat overhand used to join a pair of ropes for retrievable abseils; considered dubious in America.
expedition style

Using teams of support people (e.g. support climbers, sherpas, and/or equipment porters, etc.), and equipment (e.g. fixed rope, base camps, etc.) in helping the lead climbers reach the eventual summit; opposite of alpine style.
exposure
The level of empty space below or around a climber who is not in a secure position.

== F ==
face climbing
Any climbing on vertical rock using finger holds, edges, and smears, as opposed to crack climbing.
fall factor
Ratio of the height (h) a climber falls to the rope length (l) available to absorb the energy of a fall.
false peak

A peak that appears to be the pinnacle of the mountain but upon reaching, it turns out the summit is higher (and further ahead).
figure-four

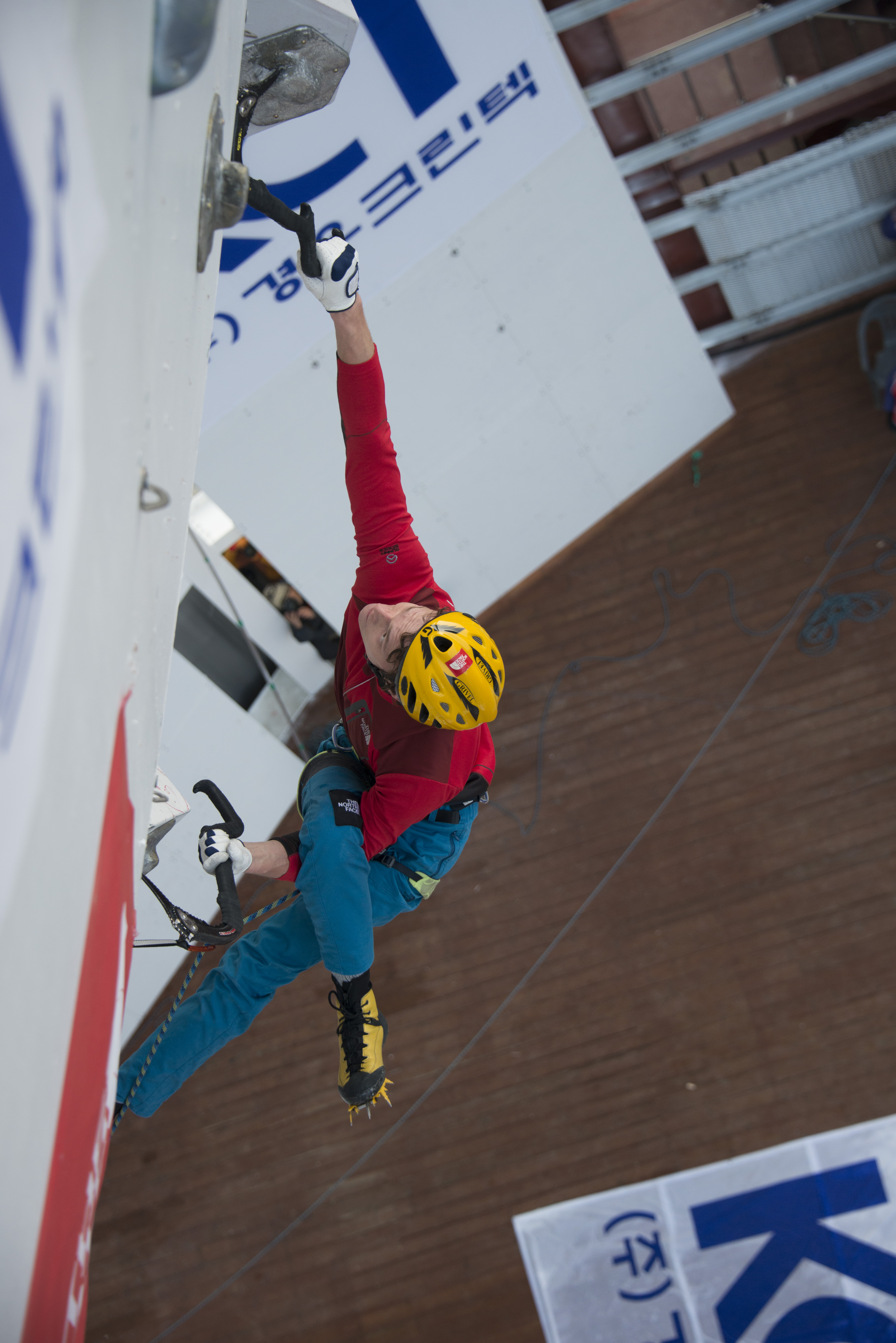
A figure-four move

An advanced climbing technique in which the climber hooks a leg over the opposite arm (which needs to be in a good handhold), and then pushes down with this leg to achieve a greater vertical reach; more common in mixed climbing.
figure-nine

A variation of the figure-four move where the "same-side" leg is used instead of the "opposite" leg.
figure eight

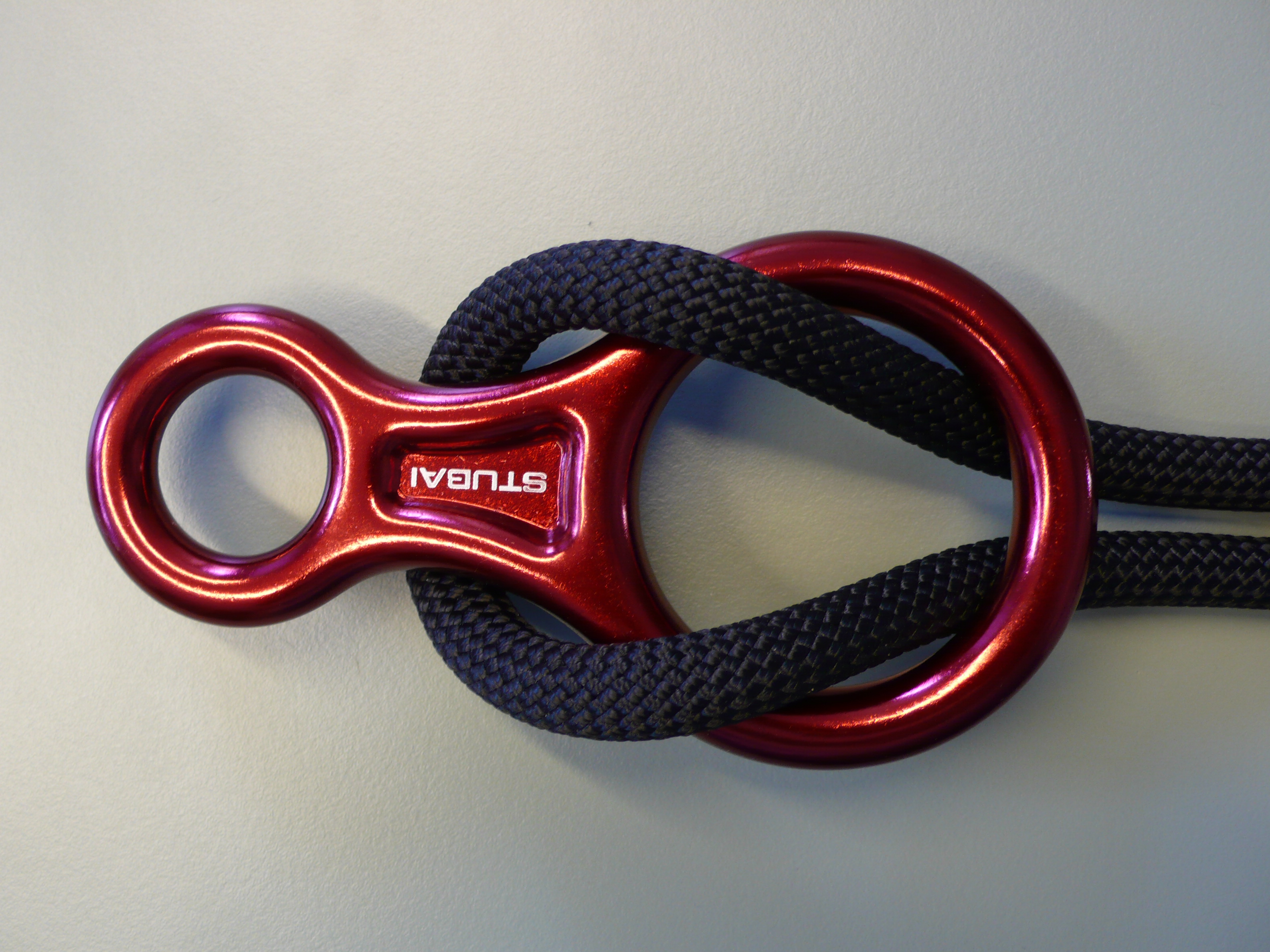
Figure eight belay

A belay device or descender that is shaped like the number eight.
figure-eight knot

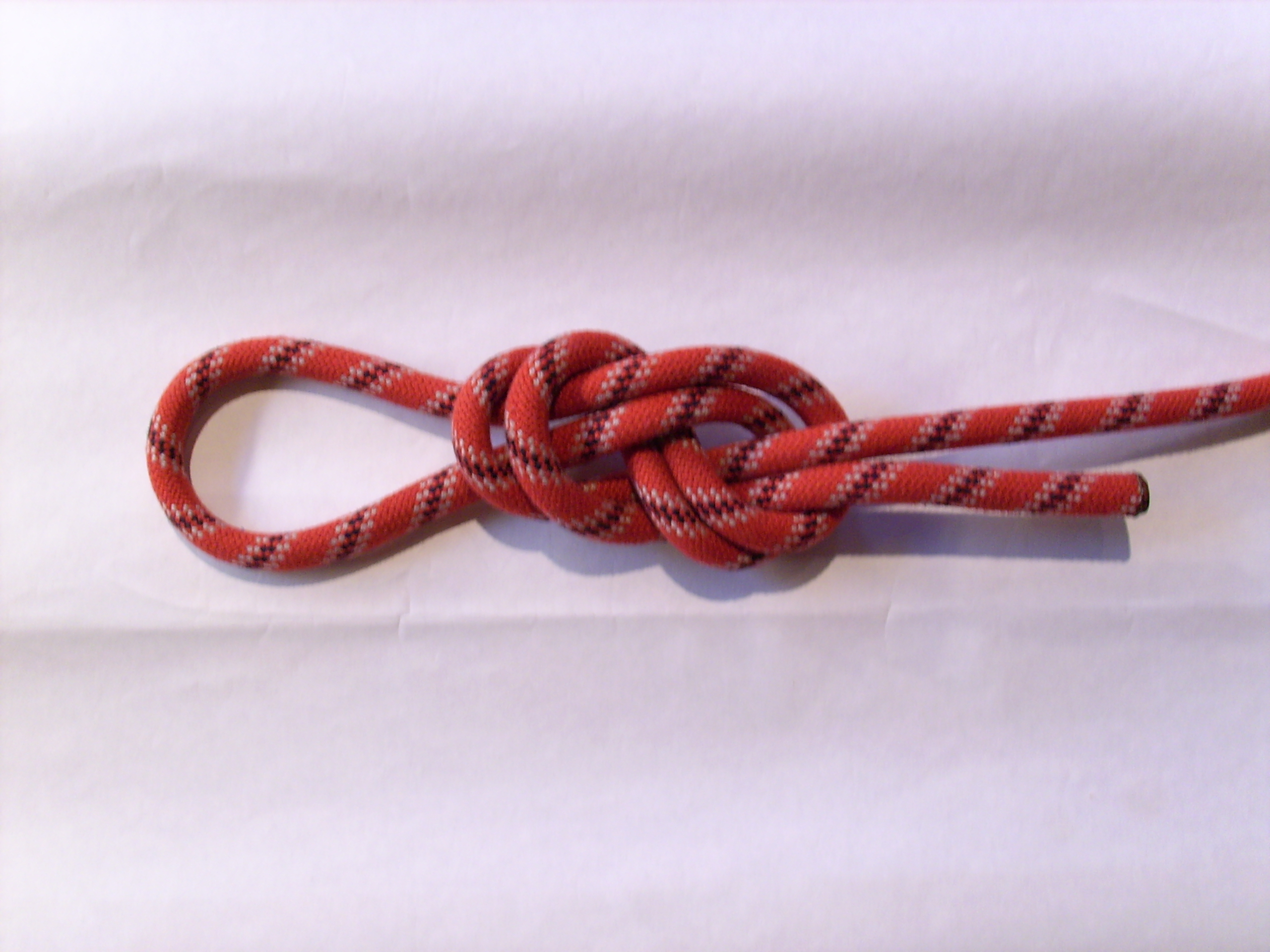
Figure-eight knot

A knot commonly used to tie in a climber's harness to the climbing rope.
finger jam

A type of jam using the fingers in a crack.
finger board
Training equipment used to build finger strength. See also hangboard.
first ascent

The first successful ascent of a new route by any means, including aid climbing (i.e. not via free climbing).
first free ascent

The first ascent of a new route without aid, following the free climbing criteria of a redpoint.
first female free ascent

The first female to complete a free ascent of a route that has already had an FFA.
fist jam
A type of jam using the hand.
fixed rope

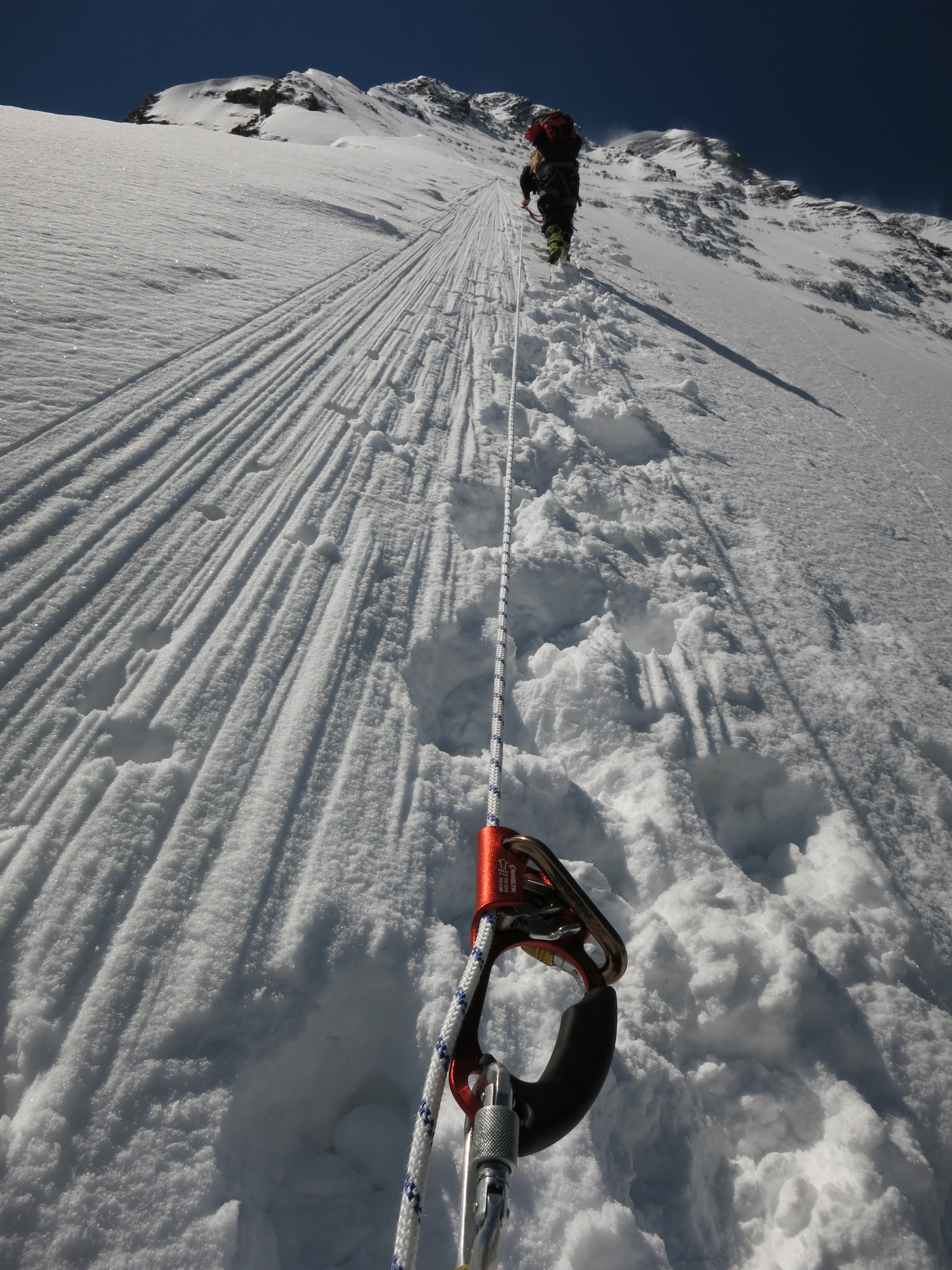
Jumaring up a fixed rope using an ascender

A rope that hangs from a fixed attachment point; commonly used for abseiling (going down) or for jumaring (going up).
flagging
A rock-climbing technique where a leg is held in a position to maintain balance, rather than to support weight, often to prevent a barn-door. There are three types of flagging:

normal flag
Flagging foot stays on the same side (e.g. flagging right foot to the right side of the body).
reverse inside-flag
Flagging foot is crossed in front of the foot that is on a foothold.
reverse outside-flag
Flagging foot is crossed behind the foot that is on a foothold.

flake
A thin slab of rock on the main face offering a hold, although it may become detached.
flash
To ascend a route on the first attempt, but having obtained beta; with no beta, it is an on-sight.
font

The French grade system for bouldering, which goes: 1, 2, 3, 4, 5, 6A, 6B, 6C, 7A, 7B, 7C, .... , to 9A; with the American V-grade system, is the most common worldwide boulder-grading system. Font grades are often confused with French grades.
foot jam

A technique of jamming the foot into a large crack by twisting so that the heel and toes touch the sides.
flapper
The tearing of skin and flesh due to friction with sharp or rough surfaces.
fourteener
A mountain summit that exceeds 14,000 feet (4,300 m), particularly one in the contiguous United States.
freeBASE
Free solo climbing but with a BASE jumping parachute as a backup in the event of a fall.
free climbing
Climbing without artificial aids other than for protection; can be done as sport climbing or traditional climbing.
free solo climbing

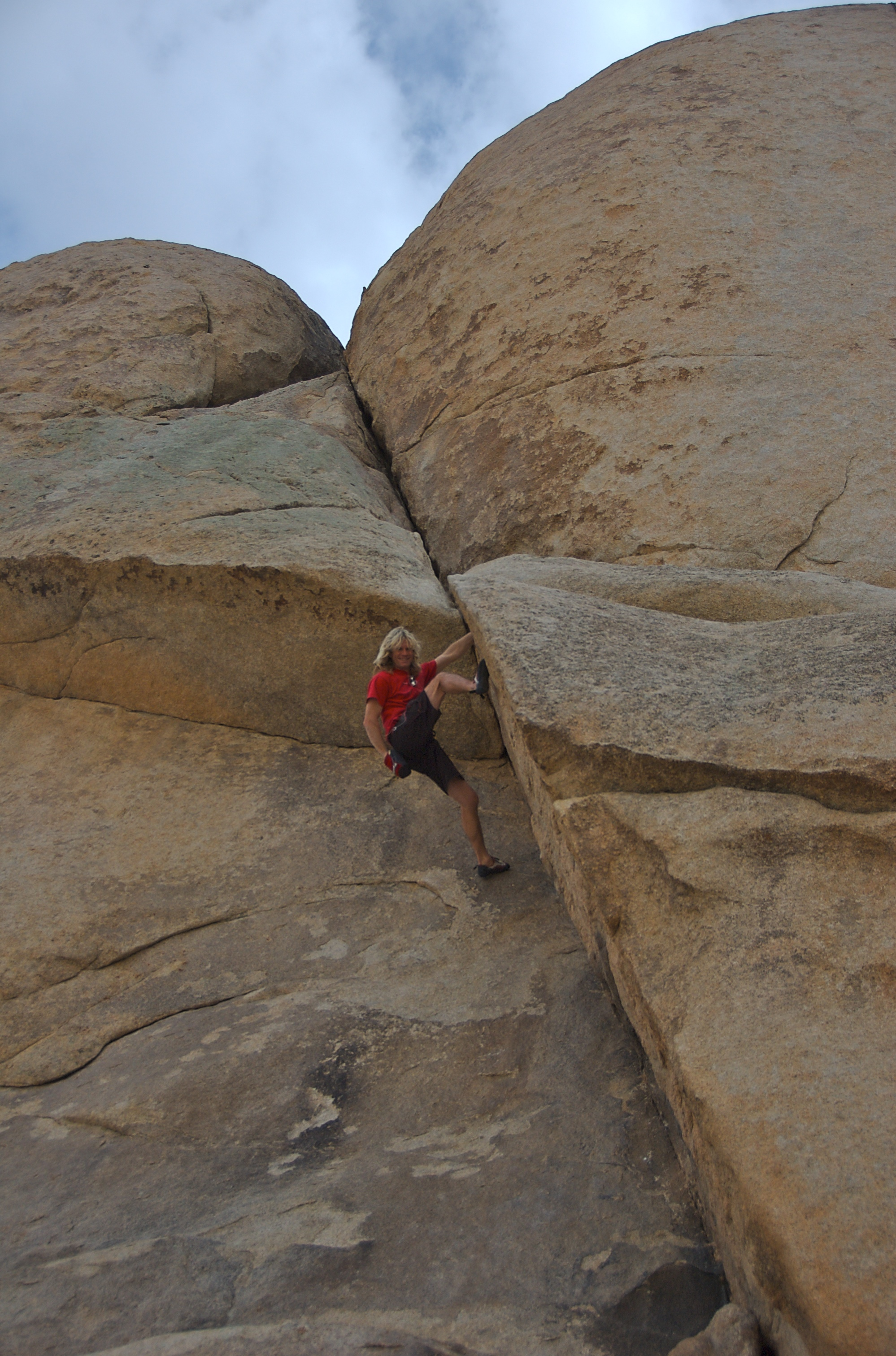
Free soloing

Climbing without any type of aid or any form of climbing protection.
French free climbing
The use of very basic aid climbing techniques (i.e. A0-graded aid techniques such as pulling on climbing protection) to bypass a short section that is not easily climbable, particularly used in big wall climbing.
French grade

The French grade system for sport climbing, which goes: 5a, 5b, 5c, 6a, 6b, 6c, 7a, 7b, 7c, .... , to 9c; with the American YDS system, is the most common sport climbing grading system. French grades are often confused with font grades.
French start
Moving off for the second hold without being established on the start holds, thus using the floor as a foothold. In most competition climbing, including IFSC events, starting a climb in this manner invalidates the attempt.
frenchies
An exercise used to develop lock-off strength consisting of pull-ups that stop with the elbows locked at angles between 20 and 160 degrees.
friable
Delicate and easily broken rock, or ice, often dangerously so.
friction climbing
A rock-climbing technique relying solely on the friction between the sloped rock and the sole of the shoe.
Friend

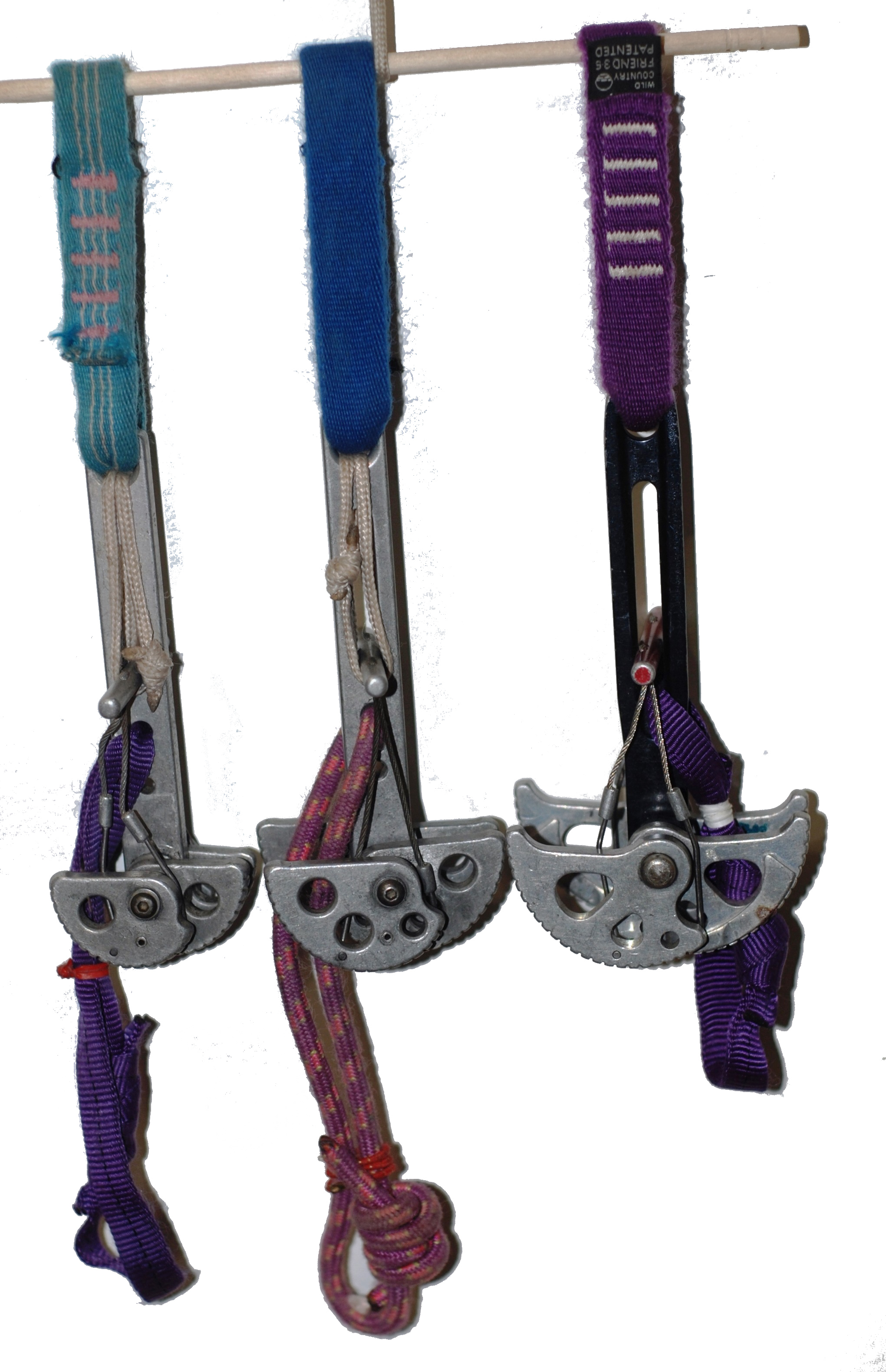
Friends

The name of Wild Country's spring-loaded camming device (SLCD) protection, and a generic name for SLCDs.
front pointing
An ice climbing technique that uses the frontmost-spikes of the crampons to ascend iced routes.
fruit boot

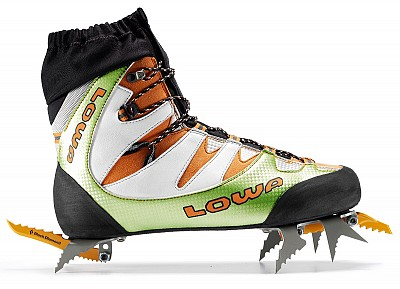
Fruit boot

Type of lightweight shoe used in mixed climbing and ice climbing that has in-built crampons.

== G ==
gaiters
Mountaineering clothing equipment that is worn over the boots and lower leg to give added protection and waterproofing.
Gaston
A climbing grip using one hand with the thumb down and elbow out, like a reverse side pull. The grip maintains friction against a hold by pressing outward toward the elbow. Named for Gaston Rébuffat.
gate flutter
The unwelcome action of the gate on a carabiner opening during a fall.
gendarme
A rock-pinnacle or isolated rock-tower encountered along a ridge; often at the intersection of ridges.
Geneva rappel
A modified Dulfersitz rappel using the hip and downhill arm for friction — less complex, but less friction and control.
GiGi
A belay plate device for belaying a second from above that has auto-blocking; made by Kong. See also Sticht plate.
glissade

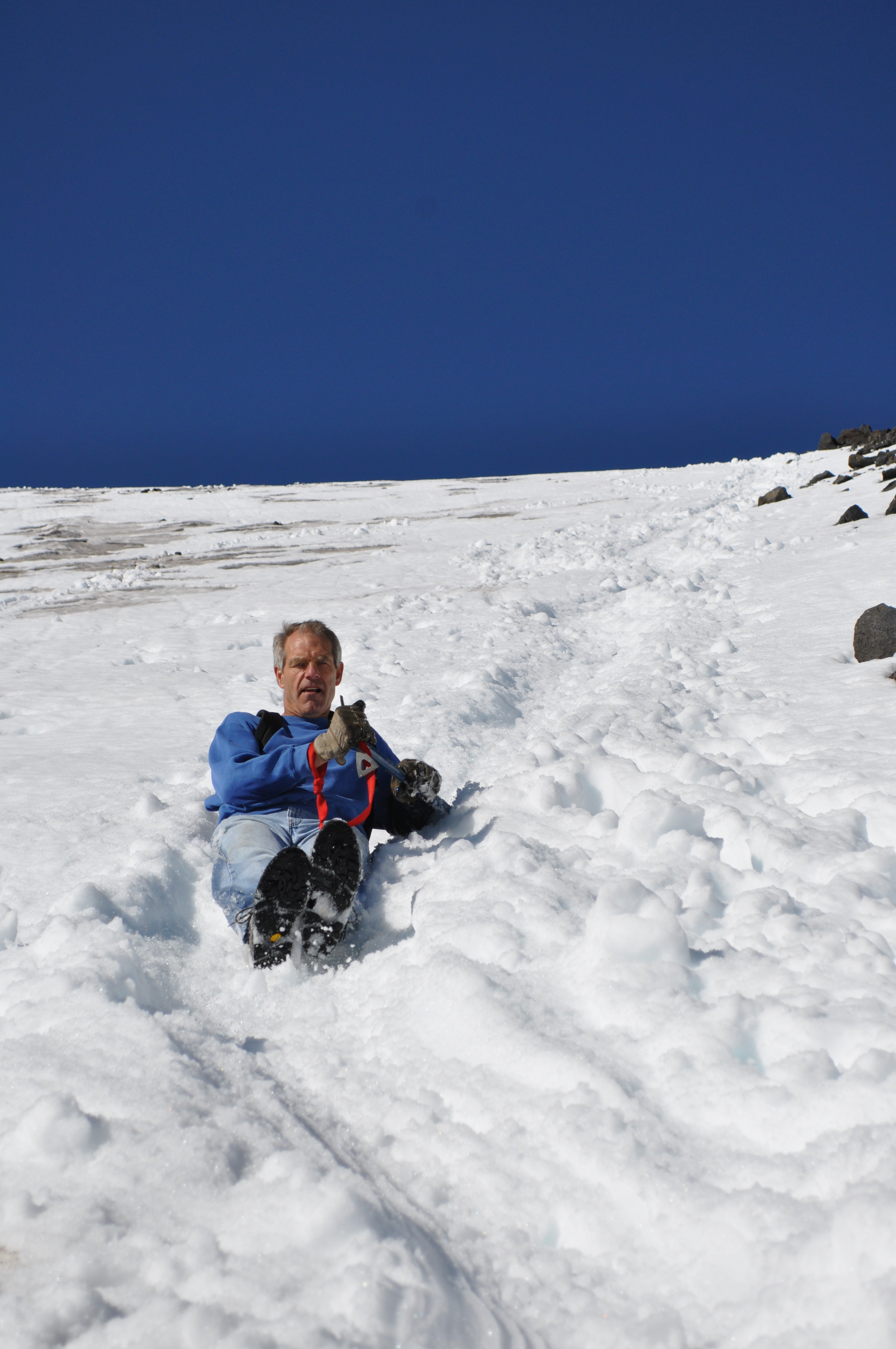
Sitting glissade

A voluntary act of sliding down a steep slope of snow using an ice axe for control.
grade
Classifications intended as an objective measure of the technical difficulty of a climbing route (including rock, ice, bouldering, mixed, and aid). The most widely used lead climbing grading systems are the French sport climbing grades, and the American Yosemite Decimal System; for bouldering, it is the font grade and the V-grade systems.
grade milestone
The first free ascent (FFA) by a lead climber of a new climbing route that sets a new grade level (e.g. the first-ever 9b (5.15b) grade milestone was Chris Sharma's FFA of Jumbo Love in 2008).
greenpoint

Ascending a sport climbing route but only using traditional climbing protection (e.g. Principle Hope). See redpoint.
Grigri

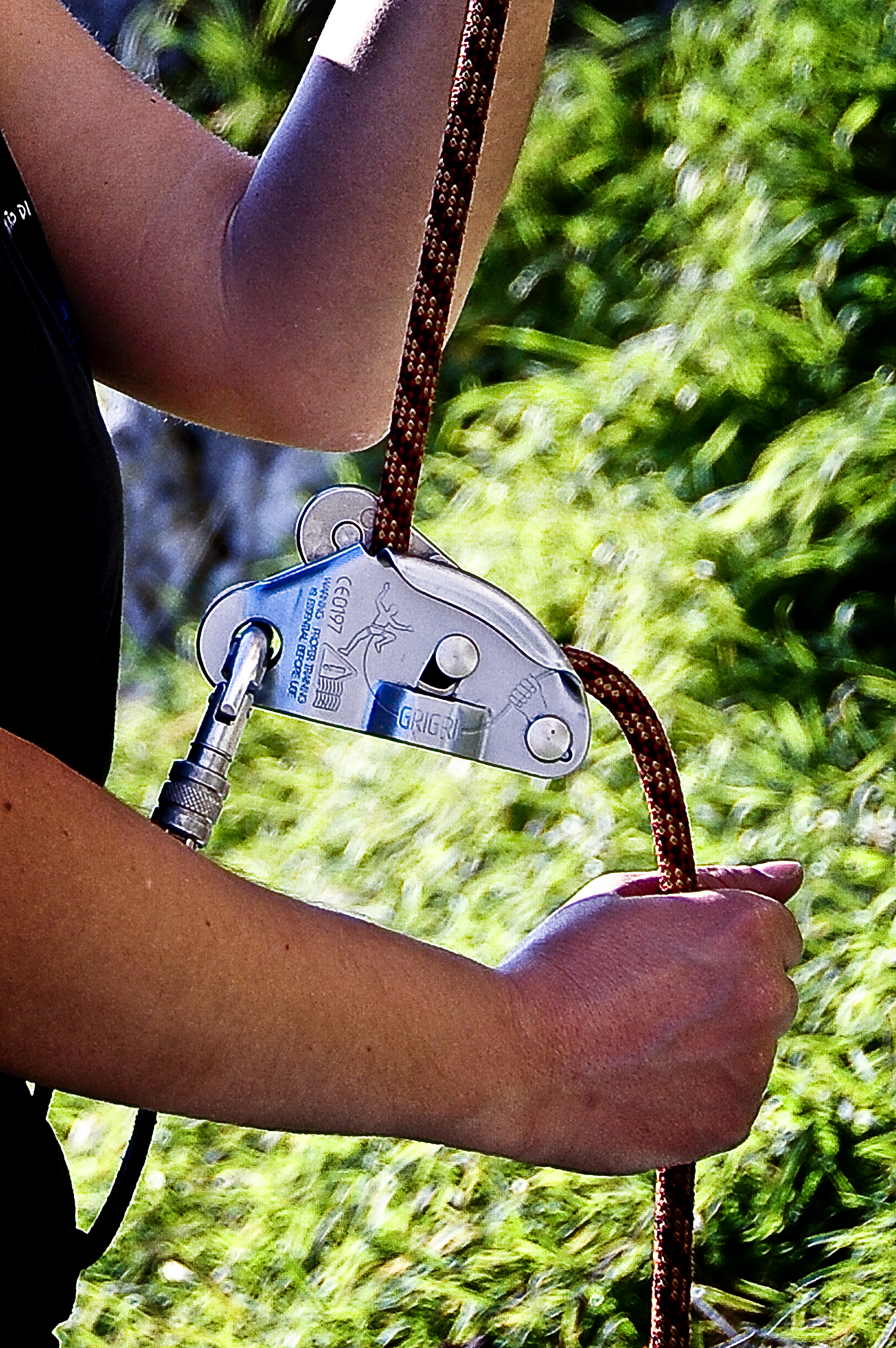
Belaying with a grigri

A belay device invented and manufactured by Petzl; also used in rope solo climbing.
gronked
Accidentally going off-route leading into a harder route; from the notorious climb Gronk in Avon Gorge.
ground fall

Where a lead climber falls and hits the ground, either because their protection failed (e.g. zipper fall), the runout was too great, or the belayer failed to arrest or hold the rope.

== H ==
half ropes
See double ropes.
hand jam
A type of jam using the hand in a crack.
hand traverse
Traversing without any definitive footholds, i.e. no edging, smearing or heelhooking.
hangboard

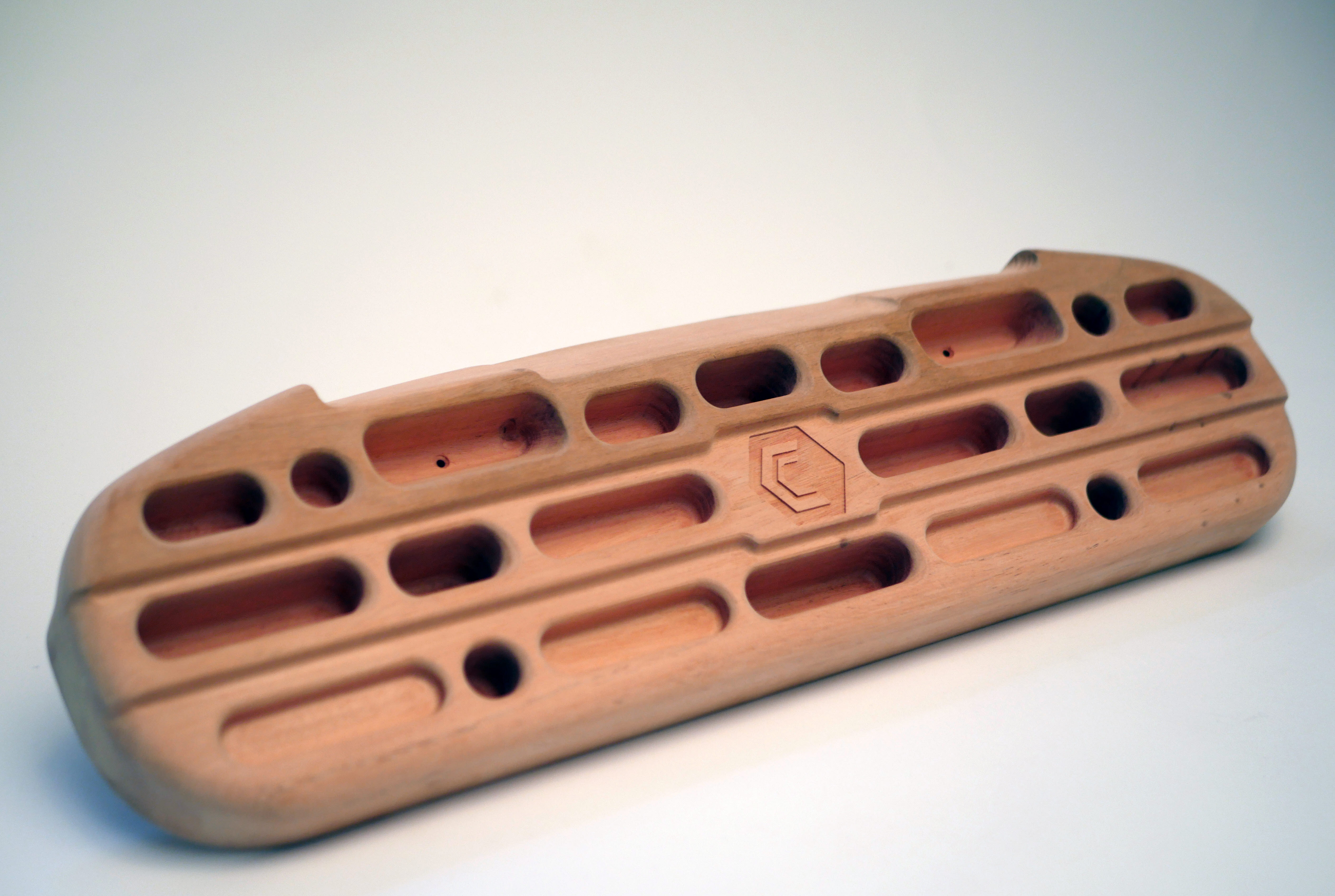
Hangboard

A training device to increase the climber's arm and finger strength. See campus board.
hangdog

To hang on the rope, or a piece of protection, after falling, and then start reclimbing without returning to the ground.
hanging belay

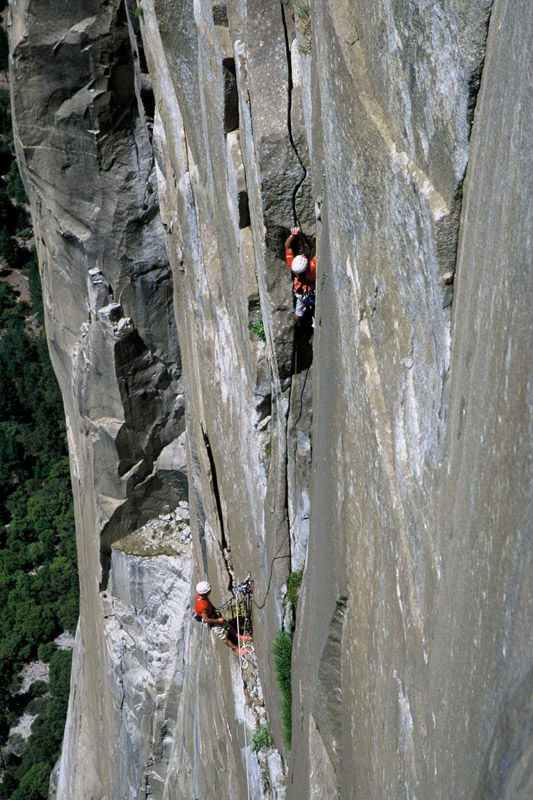
Using a hanging belay (bottom climber)

Where the belay station of the belayer is suspended from the ground and tied to the wall via a fixed anchor point; used in big wall climbing and multi-pitch climbing.
heel spurs
Type of crampon attachment to the back of the heel used in mixed climbing to perform a heel hook.
high-altitude cerebral edema

A severe and often fatal form of altitude sickness caused by physical exertion without sufficient oxygen.
high-altitude pulmonary edema

A severe form of altitude sickness caused by physical exertion without sufficient oxygen.
harness

A sewn nylon webbing load-bearing device that is worn around the climber's waist and thighs, and to which the climbing rope, and other load-bearing climbing devices, can be attached.
haul bag

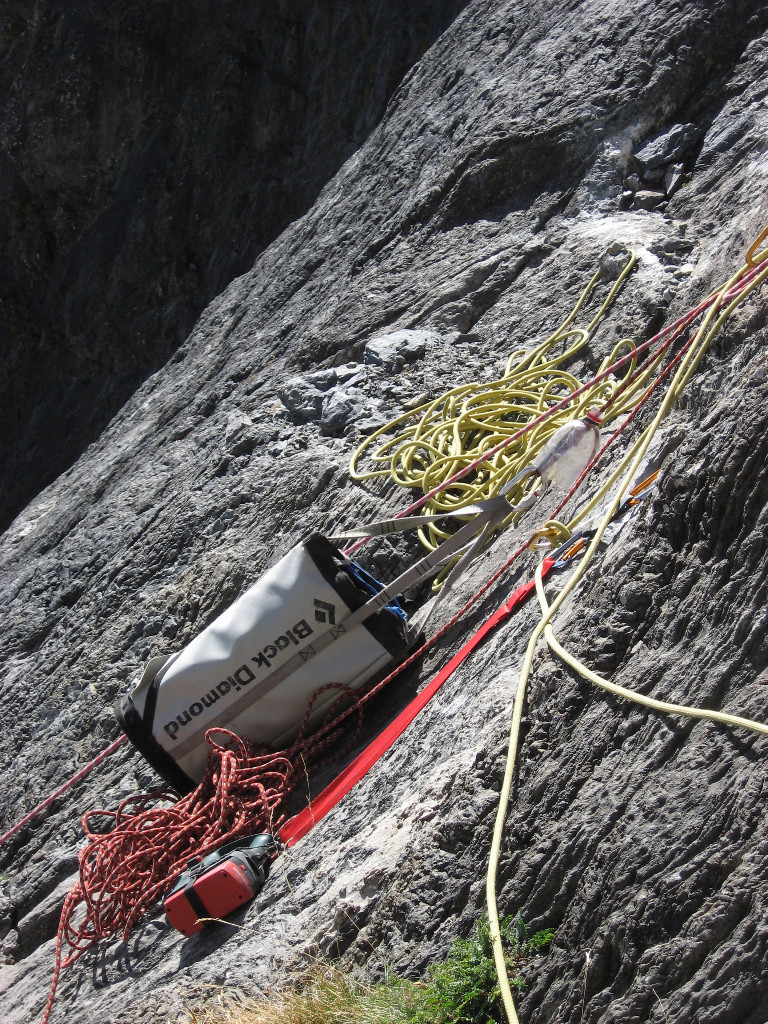
Haul bag

A large hard-wearing bag for supplies and equipment that can be dragged up multi-pitch or big wall routes.
headpoint

Top-roping a traditional climbing route before lead climbing it to practice the moves. See redpoint.
headwall
A region at the top of a cliff or rock face that steepens dramatically.
heel hook

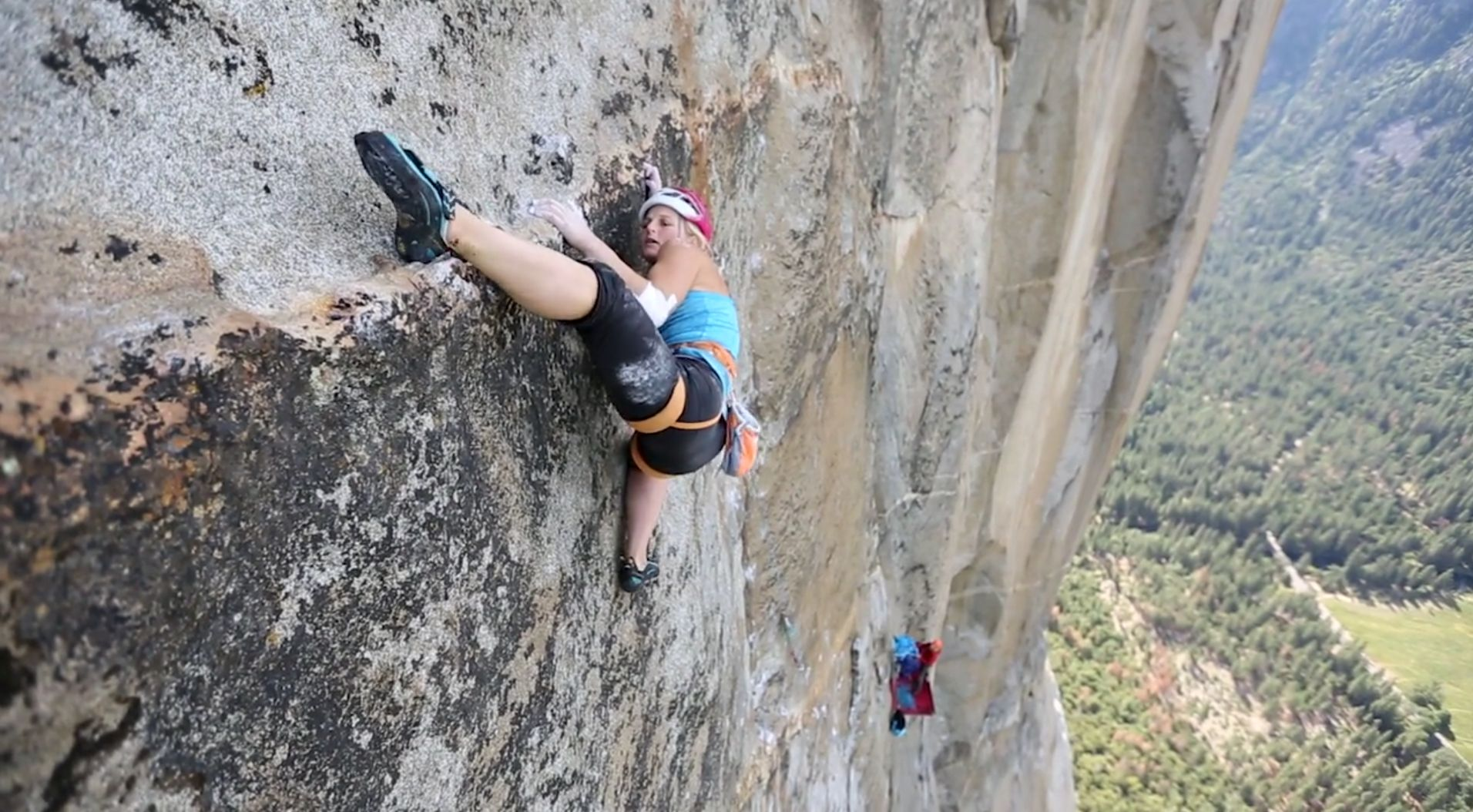
Heel hook

Using the back of the heel to apply pressure on a hold for balance or for leverage.
heel-toe

A combination of a toe hook and heel hook to hold the body onto the climbing route.
hero loop
A short runner made of 5- to 8-mm cord tied in to a loop. Commonly used for self-belay during rappel, escaping a belay, and in crevasse rescue.
hexcentric

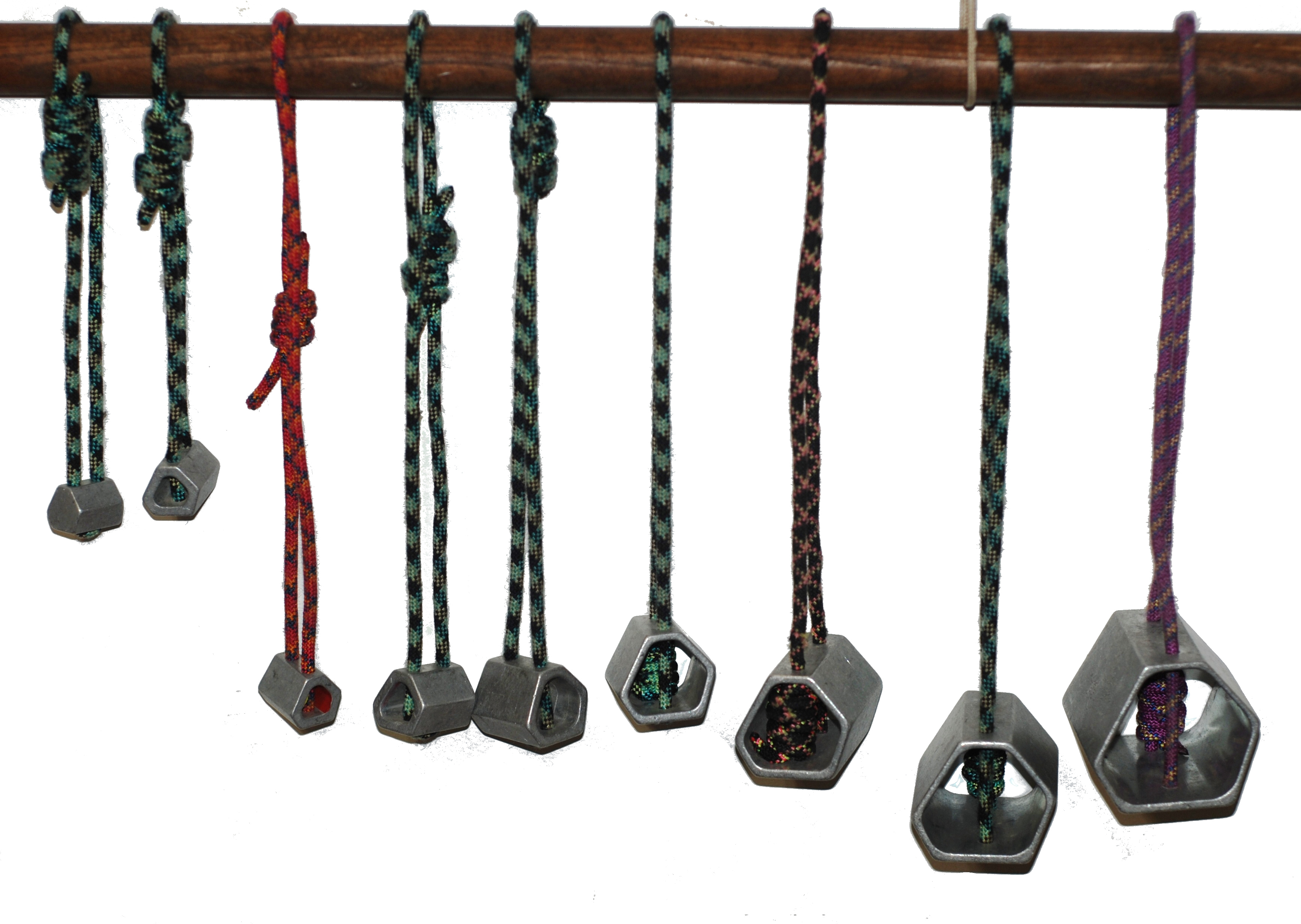
Hexes

A protective device consisting of an eccentric hexagonal nut attached to a wire loop.
highball

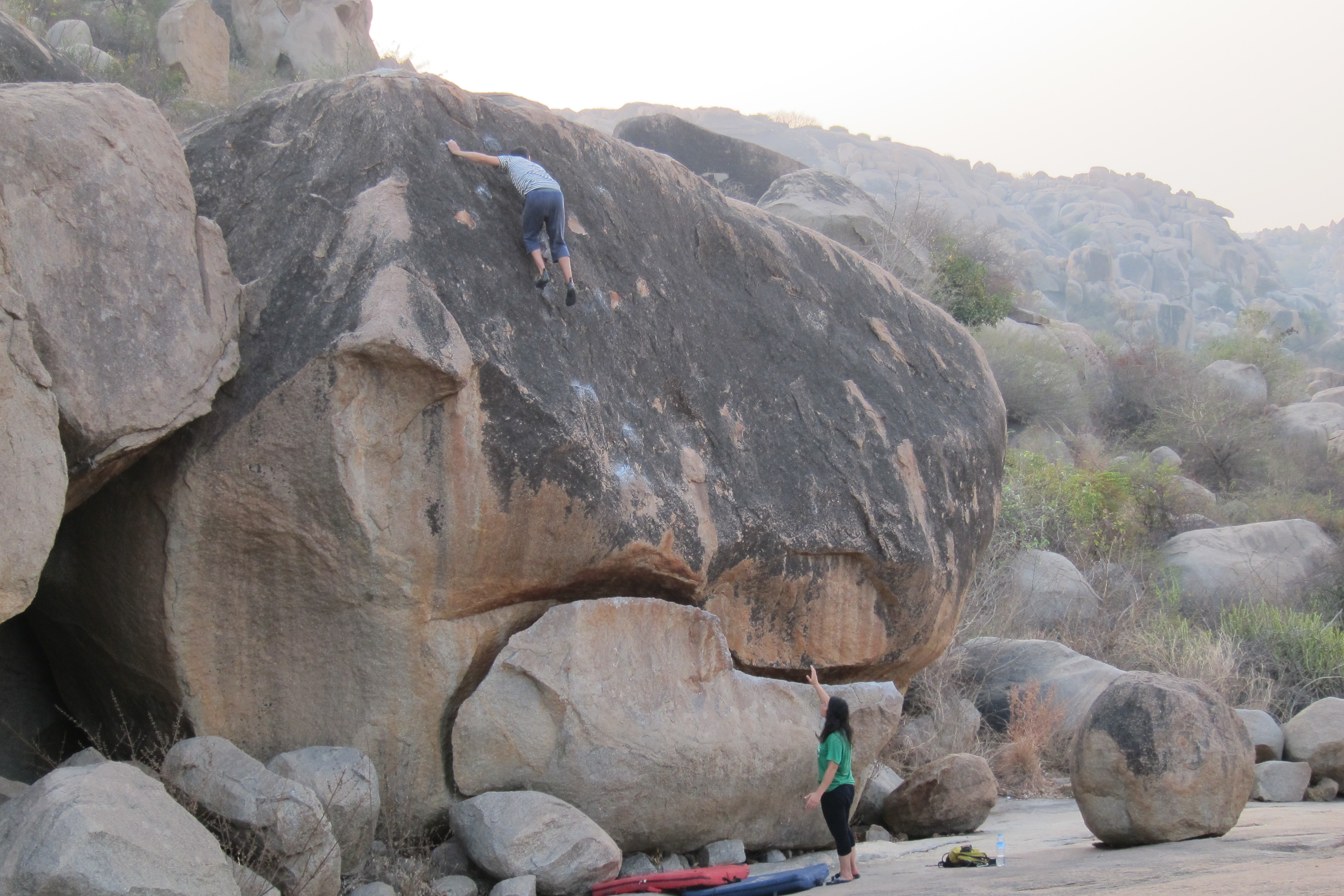
A high ball

A boulder problem over circa 5–10-metre (16–33 ft) high, where falling is dangerous.
hip belay
A method of belaying, whereby the rope friction is increased by passing the rope around the hip of the belayer.
hold
A place to temporarily cling, grip, jam, press, or stand in the process of climbing a route. See volume hold.
HMS carabiner
A round-ended carabiner for use with a Munter hitch (from German for the hitch; Halbmastwurfsicherung).
hook

A mechanical piece of climbing equipment used in aid climbing. See also skyhook.
hueco
A round hold consisting of a pocket in the rock with a positive lip, varying in size from a single finger (a "mono") to body-sized. The term comes from Hueco Tanks that is notable for huecos, the Spanish term for a "hole".
hueco scale
See V-grade.

== I ==
ice axe

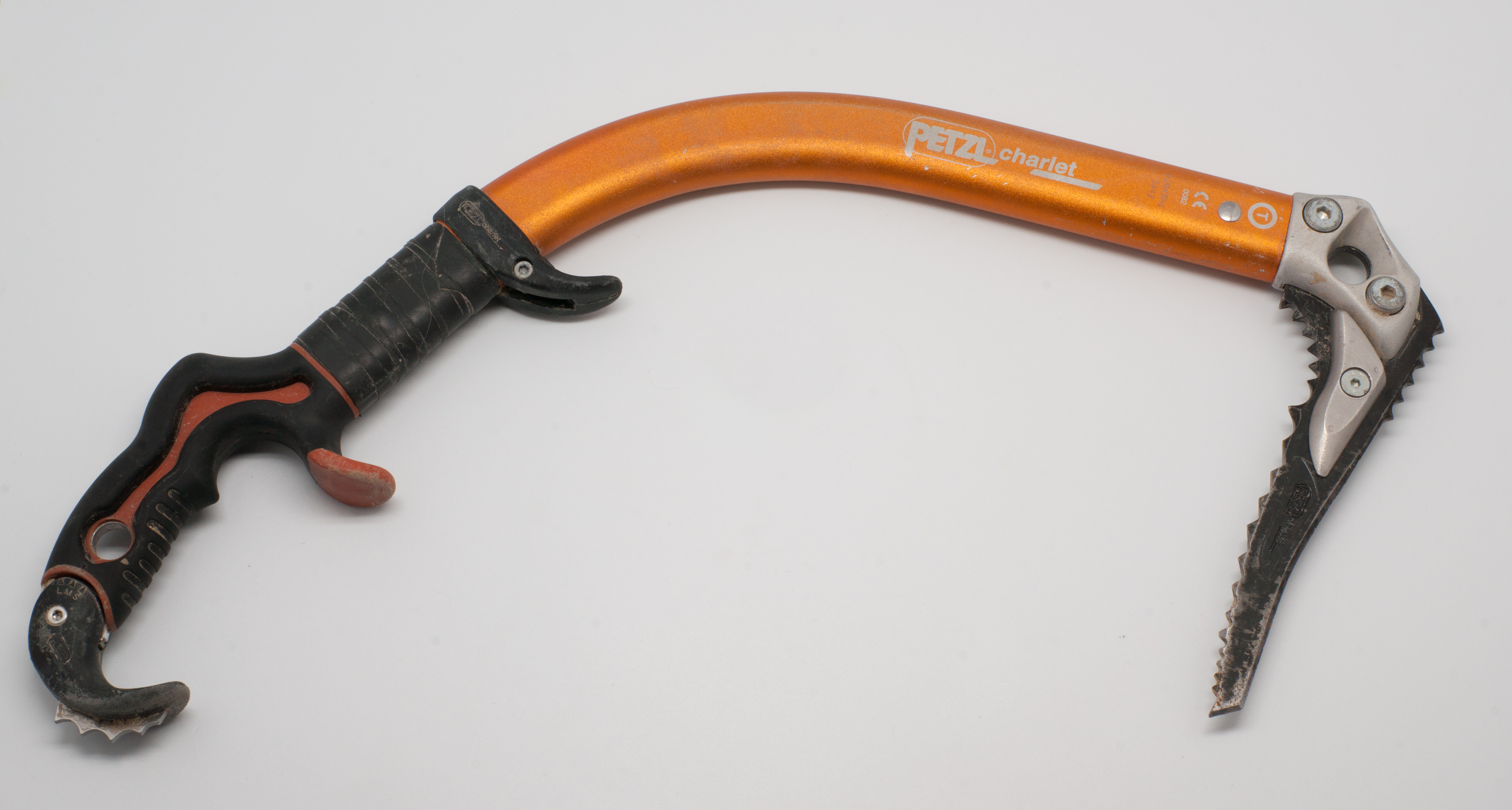
Modern ice axe

A multi-purpose tool used in alpine climbing that is a combination of an ice pick, adze, and pointed stick.
ice climbing
Ascending iced routes (e.g. waterfalls, and couloirs), with specialized equipment. See mixed climbing.
ice hammer

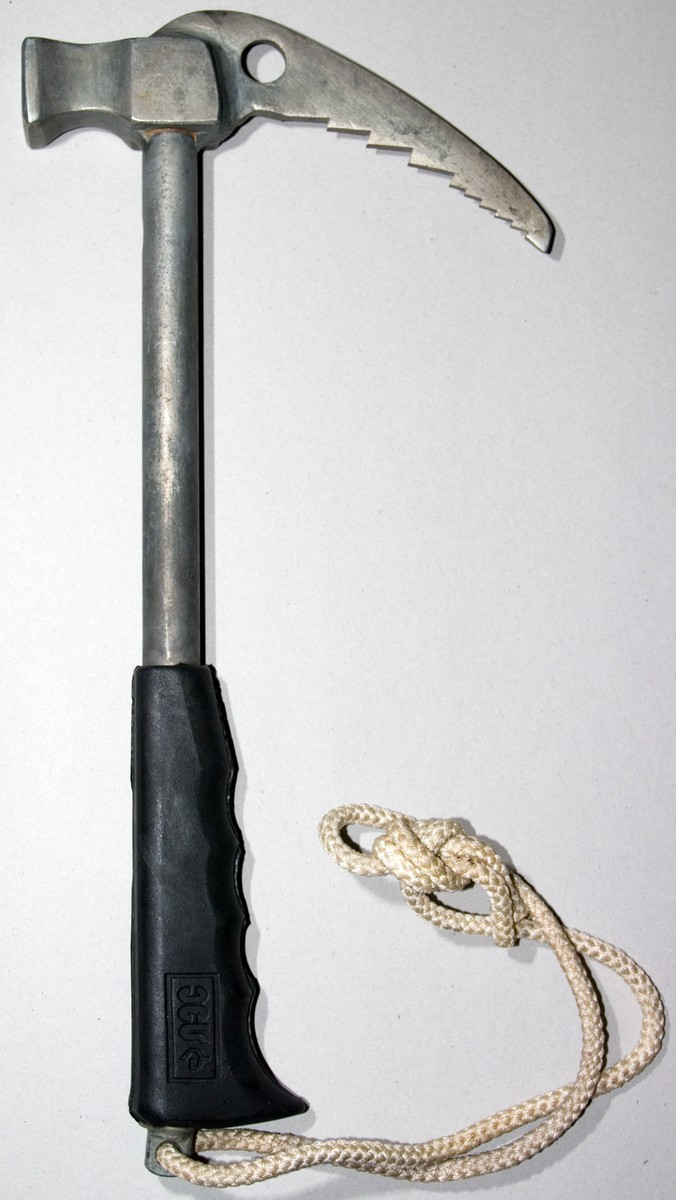
Ice hammer

A lightweight ice axe with a hammer and pick head on a short handle, and no spike. See also rock hammer.
ice piton

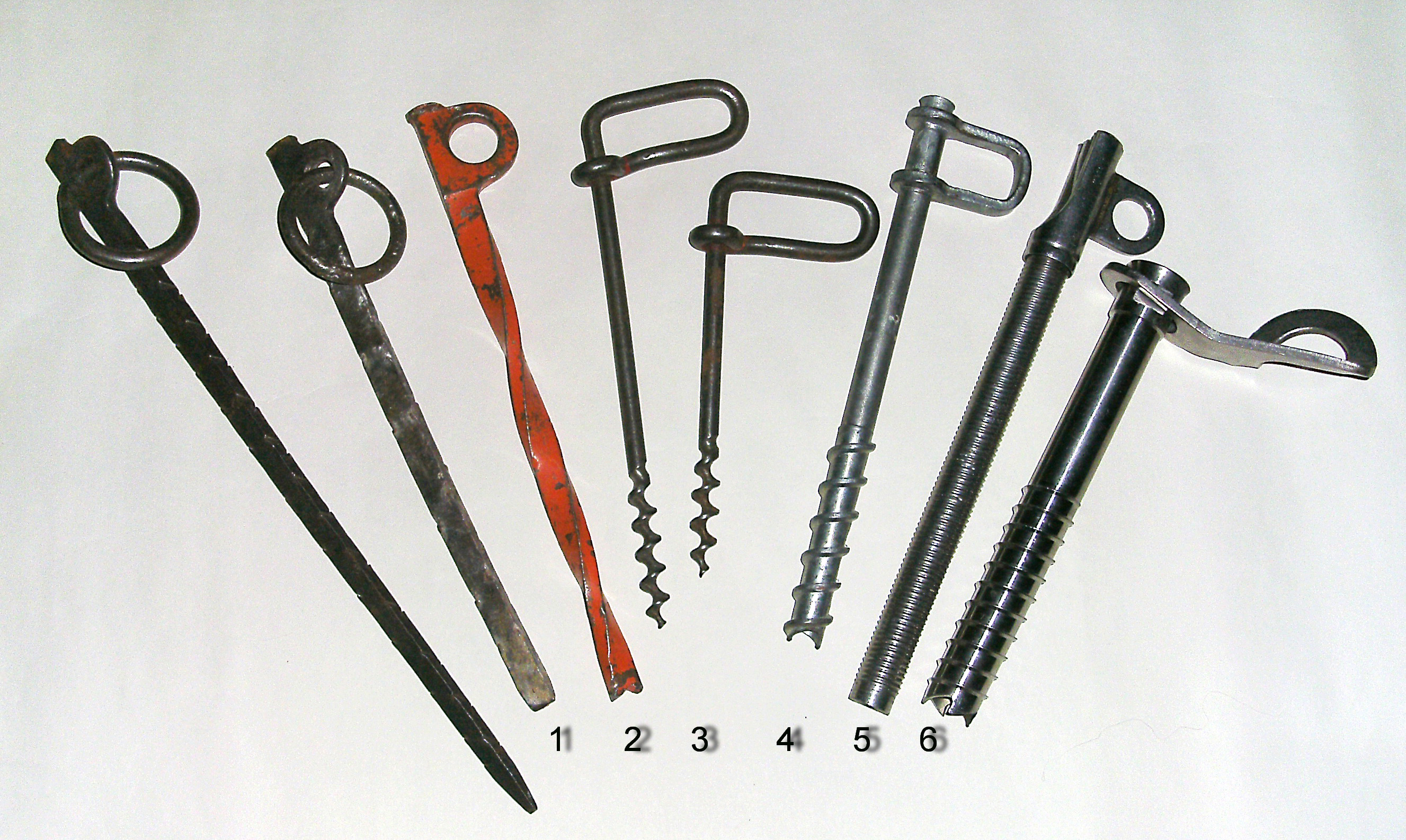
Ice pitons (left), and ice screw (right)

A long, wide, serrated piton that can be used for weak protection on ice.
ice screw
Modern protection device in ice climbing, with the tubular ice screw as the strongest.
ice tool

A specialized elaboration of the modern ice axe that is used in modern advanced ice climbing.
IFSC
Outdated acronym for the international body that organises and regulates competition climbing; now WC. See UIAA.
indoor climbing
Rock climbing that takes place on artificial climbing walls that are set up inside buildings.
in-situ
Denotes protection that is installed on the route (e.g. "there is a piton and sling "in-situ" at the crux").
isolation zone
In competition climbing, an area where competitiors are kept to prevent them getting beta on the upcoming routes.

== J ==
jamming

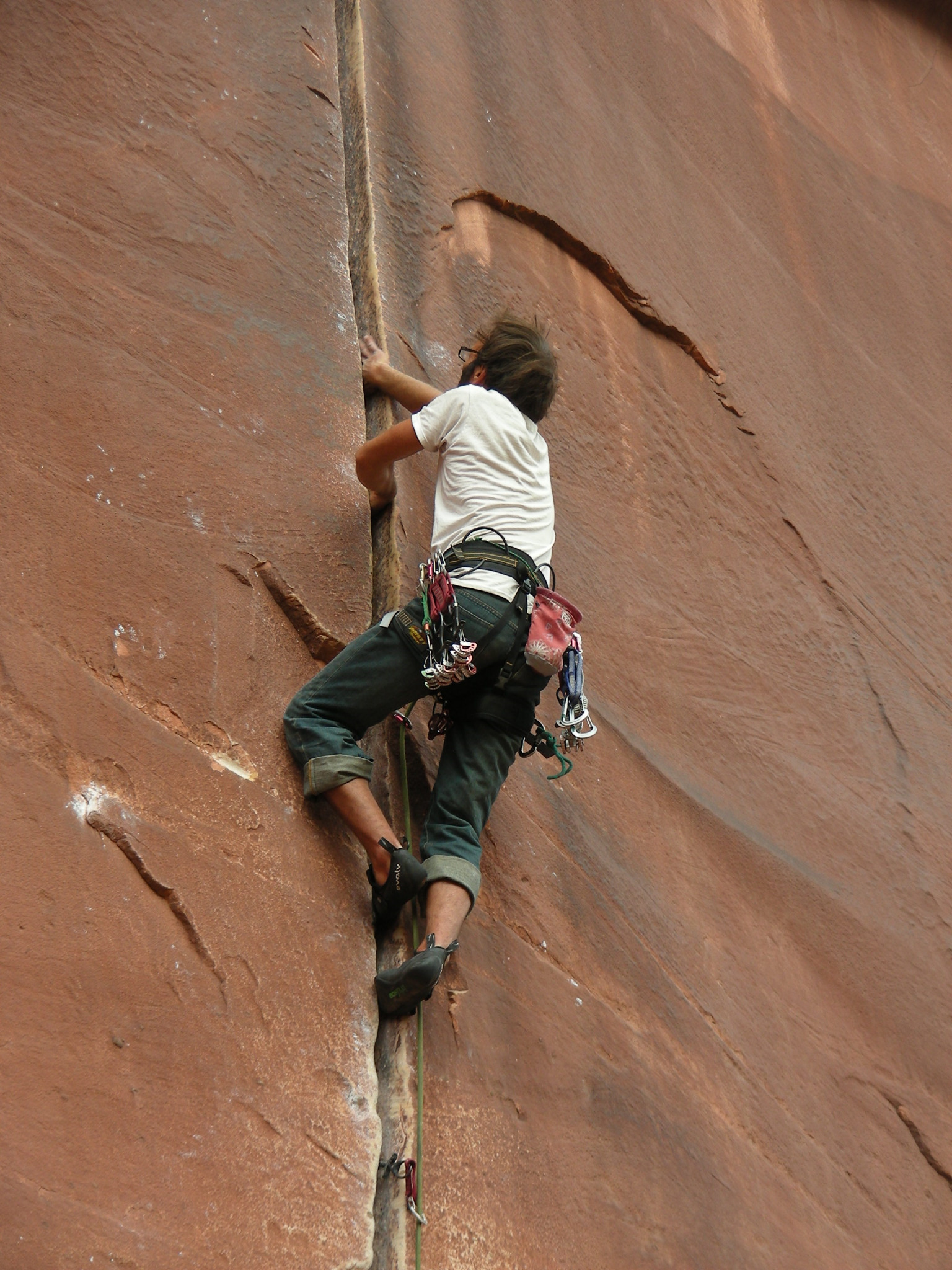
Hand jamming

Wedging a body part into a crack, including finger jam, foot jam, hand jam, and chest jam.
jib
A very small foothold, large enough for the big toe, relying heavily on friction to support the weight.
jug
See bucket.
jumar

A type of mechanical ascender, and the generic term for ascending a fixed rope using a mechanical ascender.

== K ==
karabiner
See carabiner.
Klemheist knot
An alternative to the Prusik knot, useful when the climber is short of cord but has plenty of webbing.
knee bar

Using a knee bar

Wedging a knee against a hold in such a way as to allow the other limbs to be released and rested.
knee drop
See Egyptian.
knee pad
An artificial pad that is worn on the lower thigh to protect a climber when performing a knee bar; initially controversial as they raised technical standards, but came to be accepted like climbing shoes.

== L ==
lache
Modern climbing and parkour movement (most commonly used in bouldering) where the climber dynamically progresses laterally by use of momentum gainned by swinging with feet and legs, and then letting go with the hands (from the French lâcher; let go).
ladder

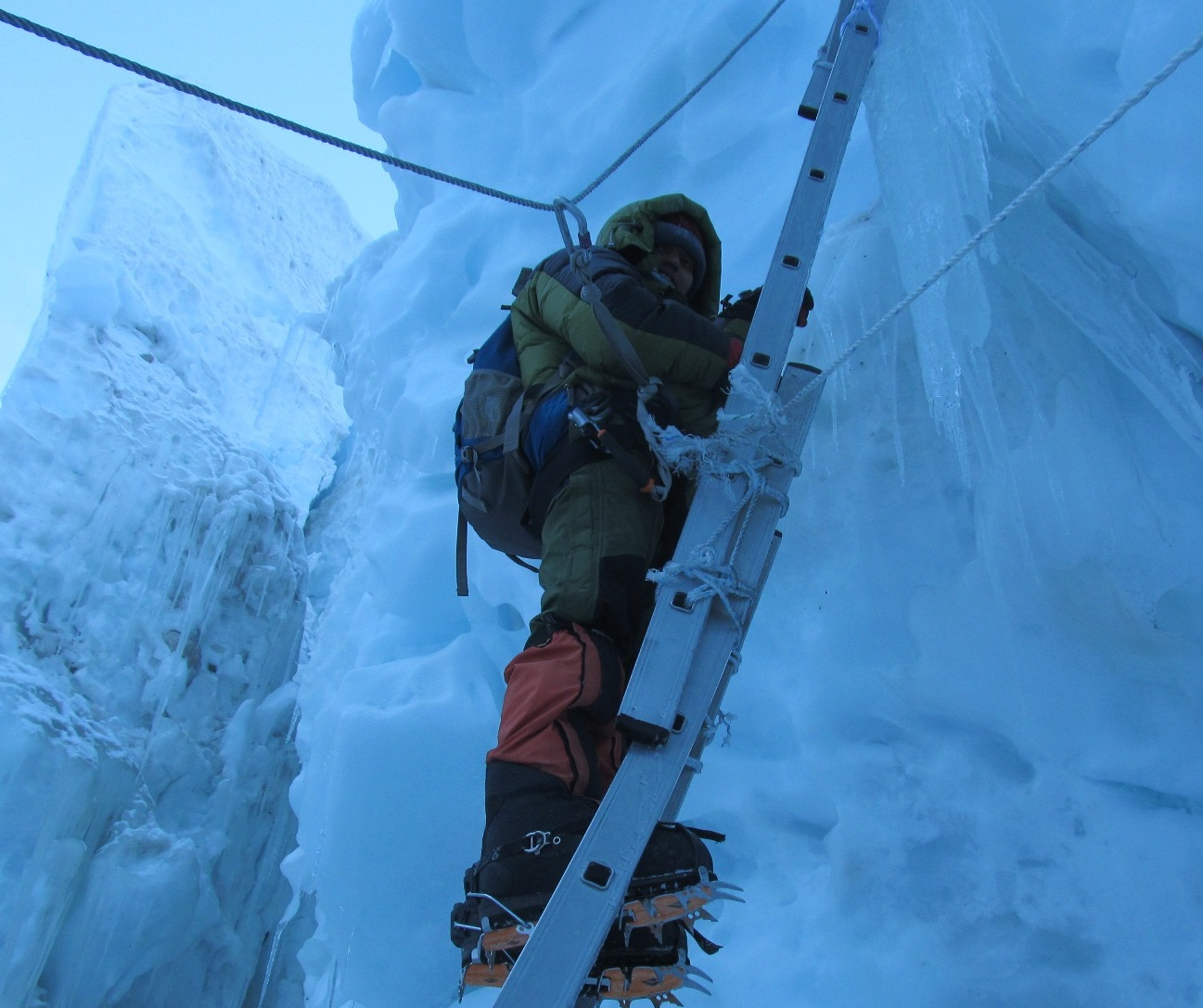
Aluminum ladder

Lightweight rigid aluminum ladders are used in expedition style mountaineering to cross crevasses or on difficult sections as a form of aid climbing support (this can also be done with flexible bachar ladders). See also aider.
lanyard

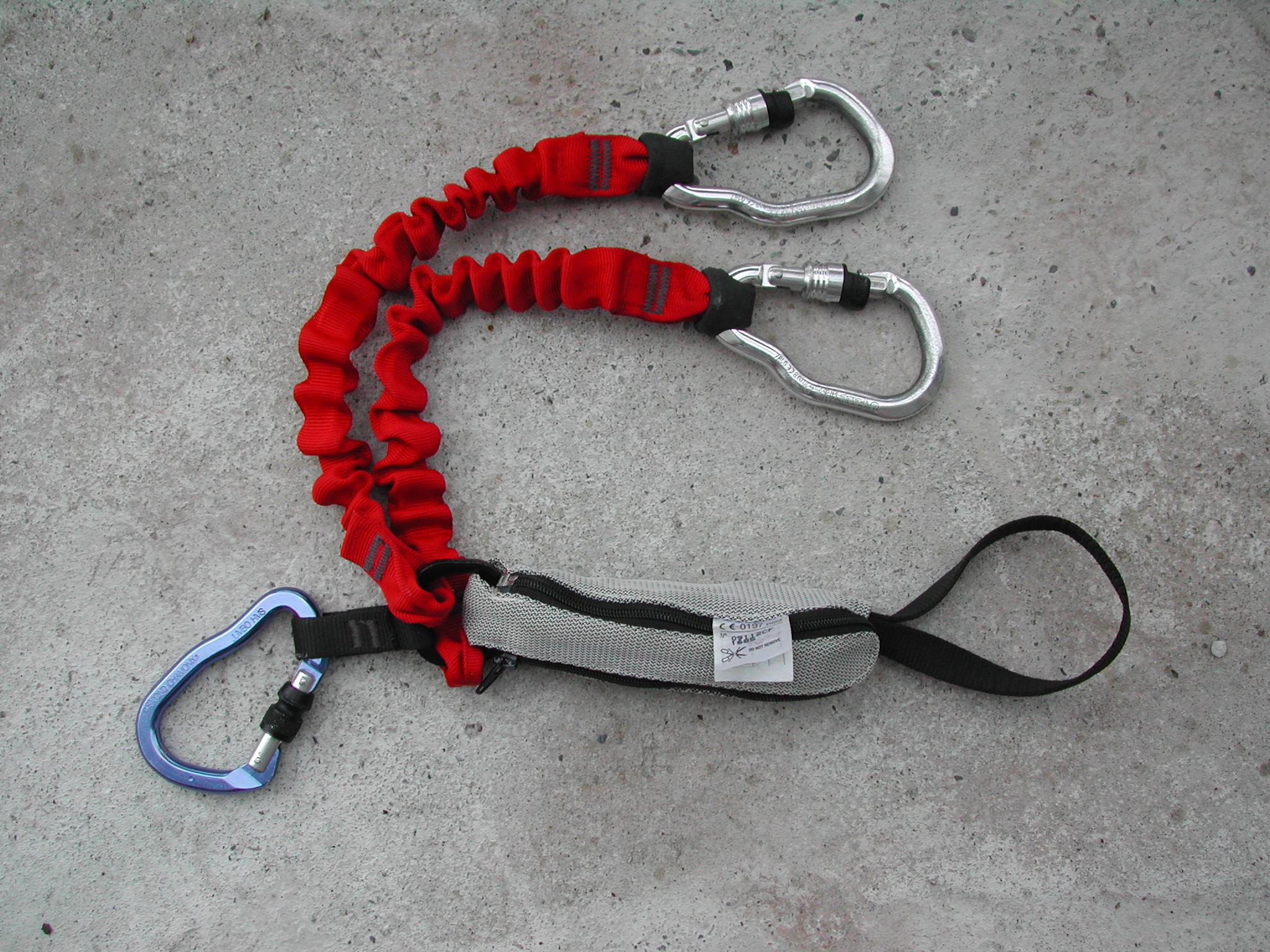
A Petzl lanyard and energy absorber

A Y-shaped piece of protection equipment used in via ferrata climbing that attaches the harness to the fixed steel cables. Lanyards often attach to energy absorbers given the higher fall factor of via ferrata climbing.
laybacking

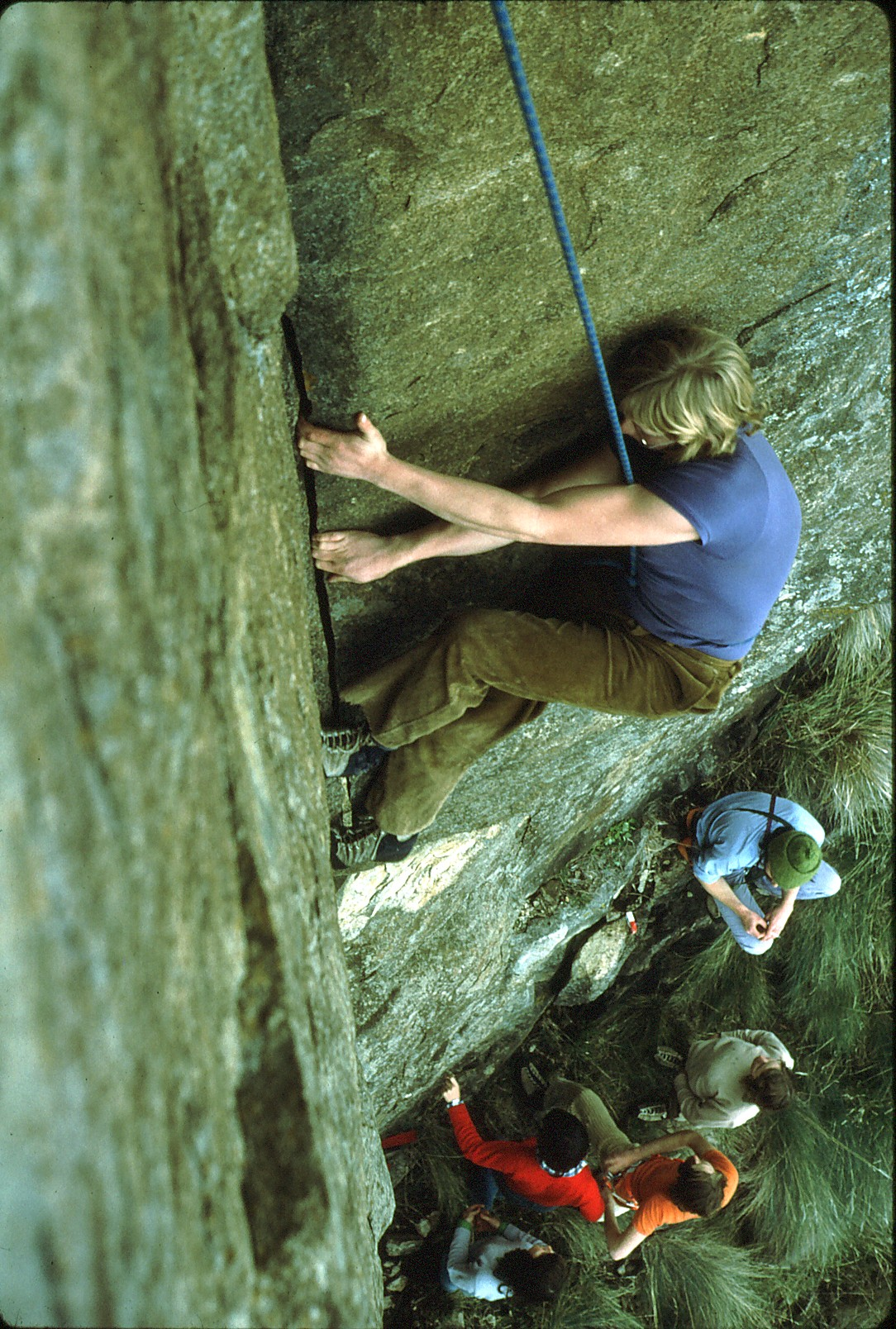
Laybacking

Climbing an edge by side-pulling with both hands and using opposing friction for the feet.
lead climbing

A form of climbing in which a lead climber clips their belay rope into protection equipment as they ascend.
lead climber

The individual ascending the route in lead climbing; the other person is the belayer.
leader fall
A lead climber fall while lead climbing; will be at least twice the distance to the last piece of protection.
Leavittation
A technique used to climb off-width cracks pioneered in the late 1970s by Randy Leavitt and Tony Yaniro that uses alternating hand-fist stacks and leg-calf locks; helpful for resting, and when placing protection.
liquid chalk
A liquid form of climbing chalk but with a longer hold time.
live rope
In lead climbing, the segment of the rope between the lead climber and the belayer.
lock-off

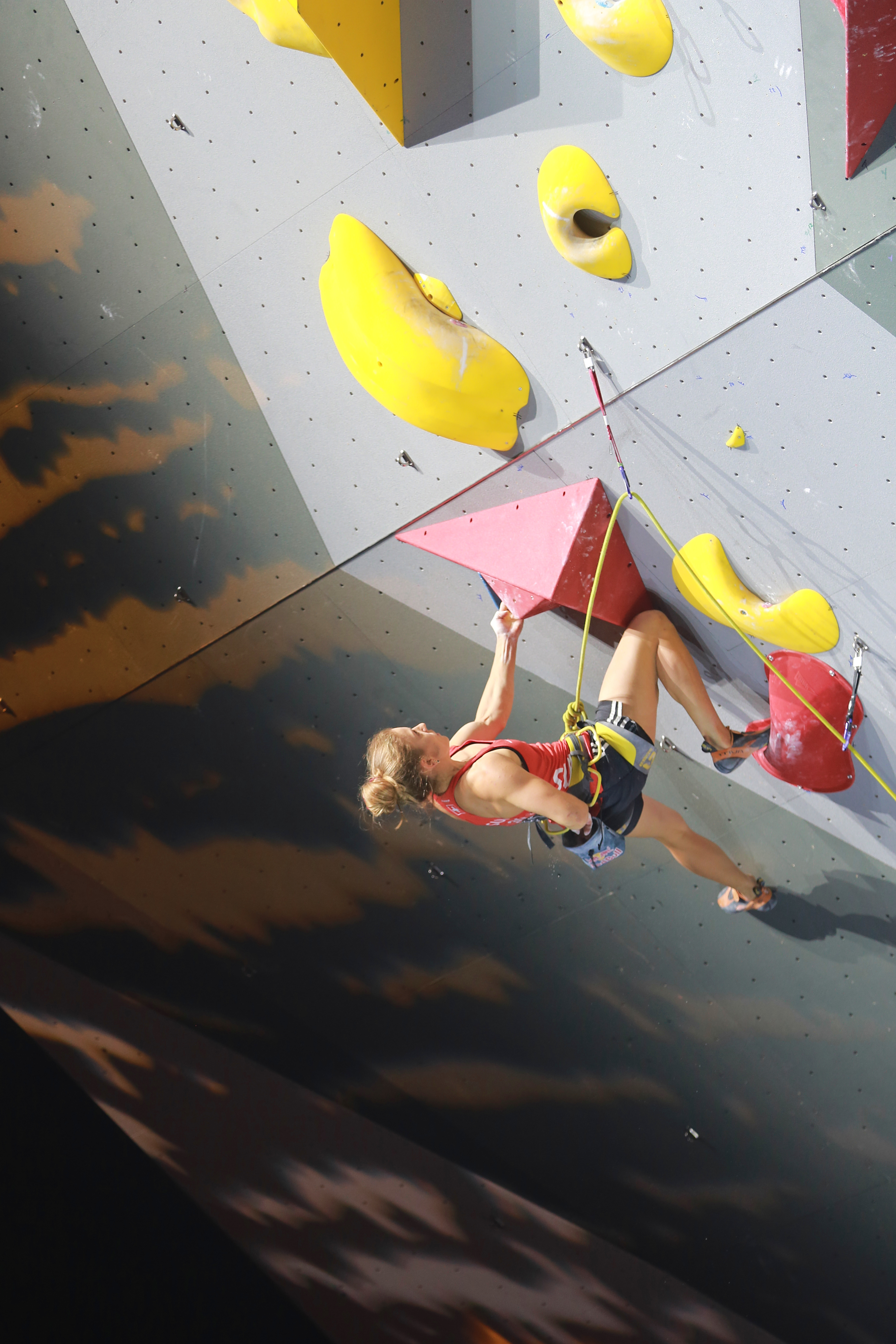
Resting lock off

A climber holding a fixed position with one bent arm, usually while clipping or reaching for another hold with their other arm, or resting. Contrast with dead hang.
lolotte
See Egyptian.
lower-off
When a lead climber is lowered down the route by the belayer holding their weight on the belay device.
low zone
In competition bouldering, a marked hold somewhere between the start and zone. It is either worth some number of points (less than the zone) or used as a tiebreaker.

== M ==
M-grade

Part of the mixed climbing system for grading the technical difficulty of mixed climbing routes, which goes: M1, M2, M3, M4, M5, M6, and up to M14. See also D-grade.
mantel move

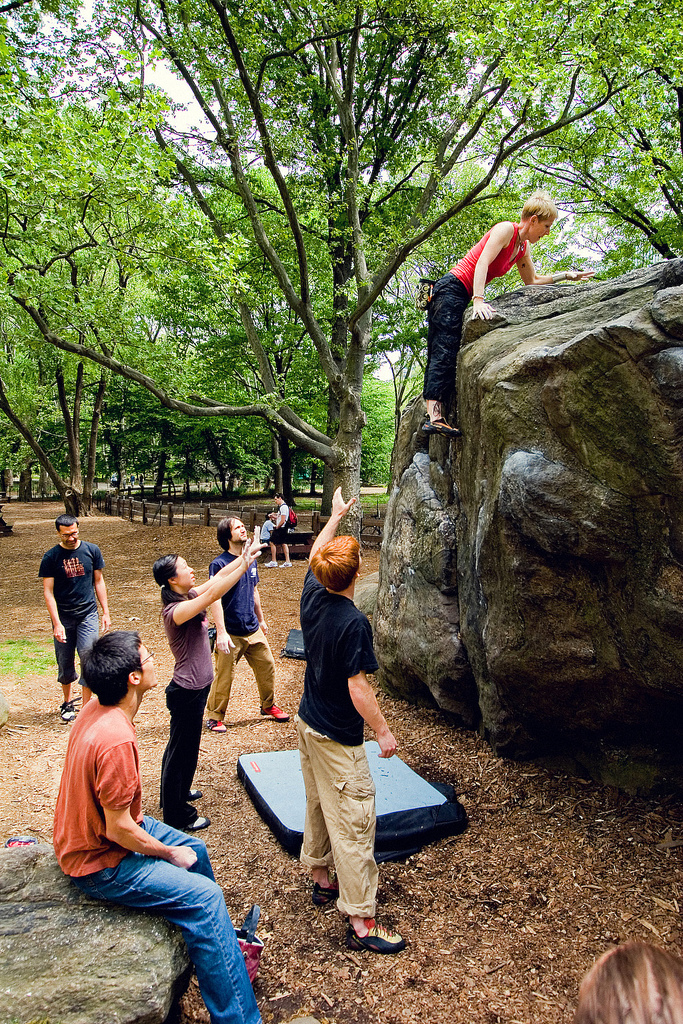
Mantel move

Moving onto a shelf of rock by pressing down on it with the palms until the climber can stand on the "mantel" (i.e. the same action as leaving from the side of a pool).
mixed climbing
A type of climbing that involves using ice climbing tools on iced-up or snow-covered rock surfaces; mixed climbing techniques are used in dry-tooling and in alpine climbing.
mono

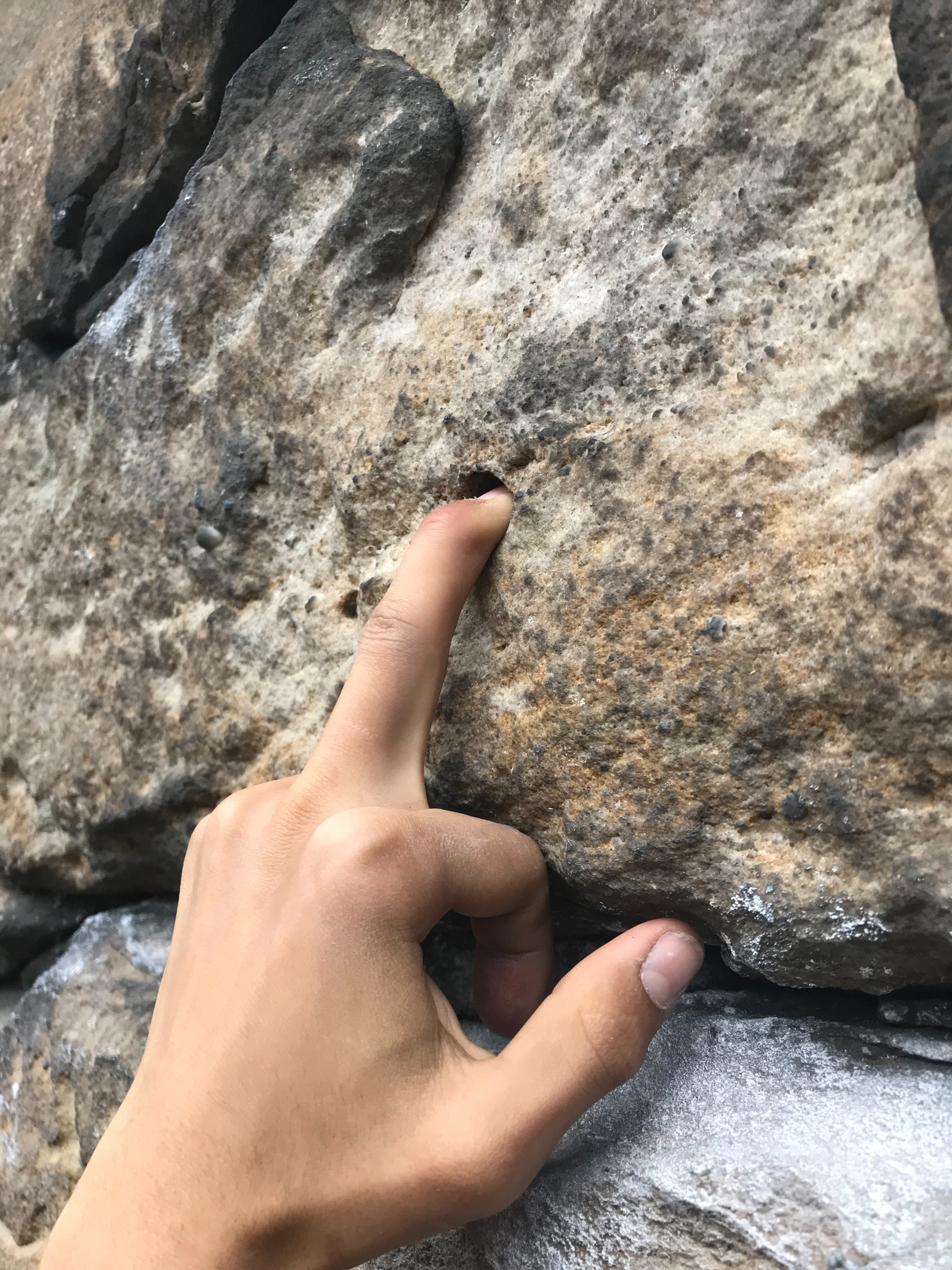
Mono hold

A climbing hold, typically a pocket or a hueco, which only has enough room for one finger.
moving together
See simul climbing.
multi-pitch climbing
A climb that has more than one pitch; a big wall route involves so many pitches, it takes over a day.
Munter hitch

A simple hitch used for belaying without a mechanical belay device.

== N ==
National Climbing Classification System

A North American grading system used mainly in big wall climbing and alpine climbing; goes from I, II, III ... to VII.
névé
Permanent granular ice formed by repeated freeze-thaw cycles.
new wave
See A-grade.
no-hand rest

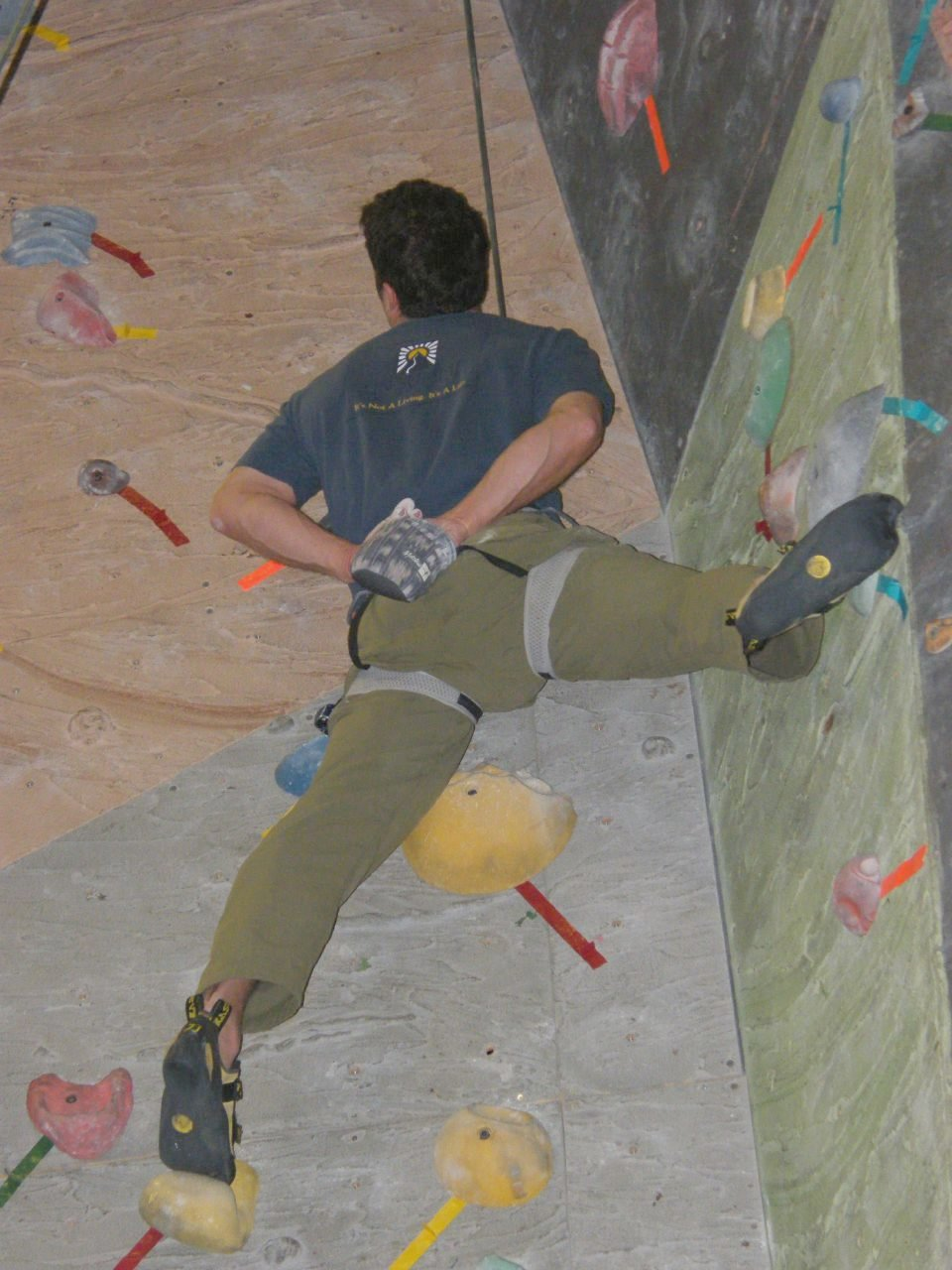
No-hand rest

An entirely leg-supported resting position during climbing that does not require hands on the rock.
normal route

The easiest and most frequently used route for ascending and descending a climb.
nunatak
A mountain or rock formation that protrudes through an ice field.
nut

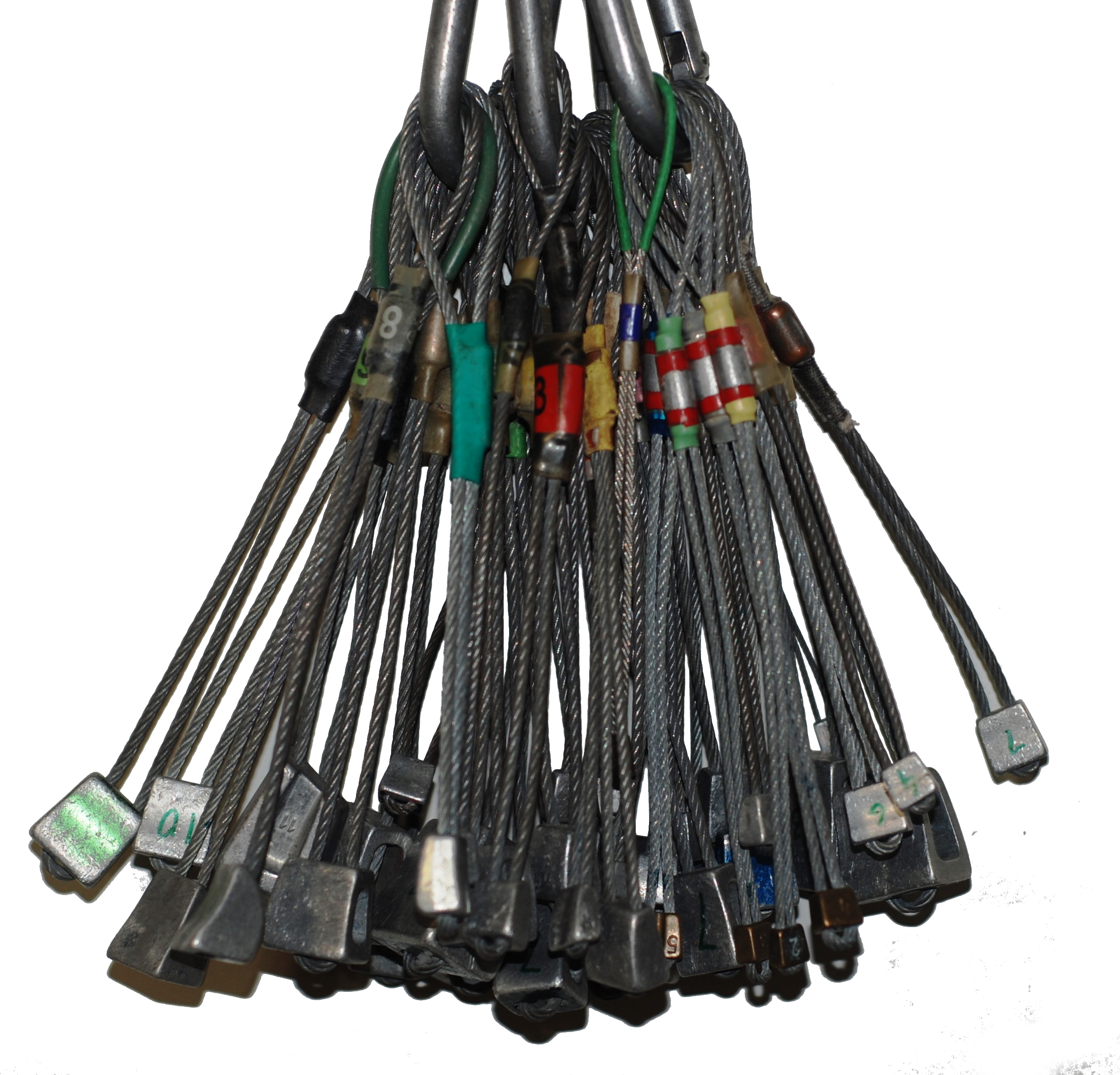
Nuts

A metal wedge attached to a wire loop that is inserted into cracks for protection. See hexcentric.
nut key

See cleaning tool.

== O ==
off belay
American climbing command when requesting that the belayer remove belay equipment from the climbing rope (e.g. when cleaning top protection from a lead route). Replied to with "belay off".
off-width

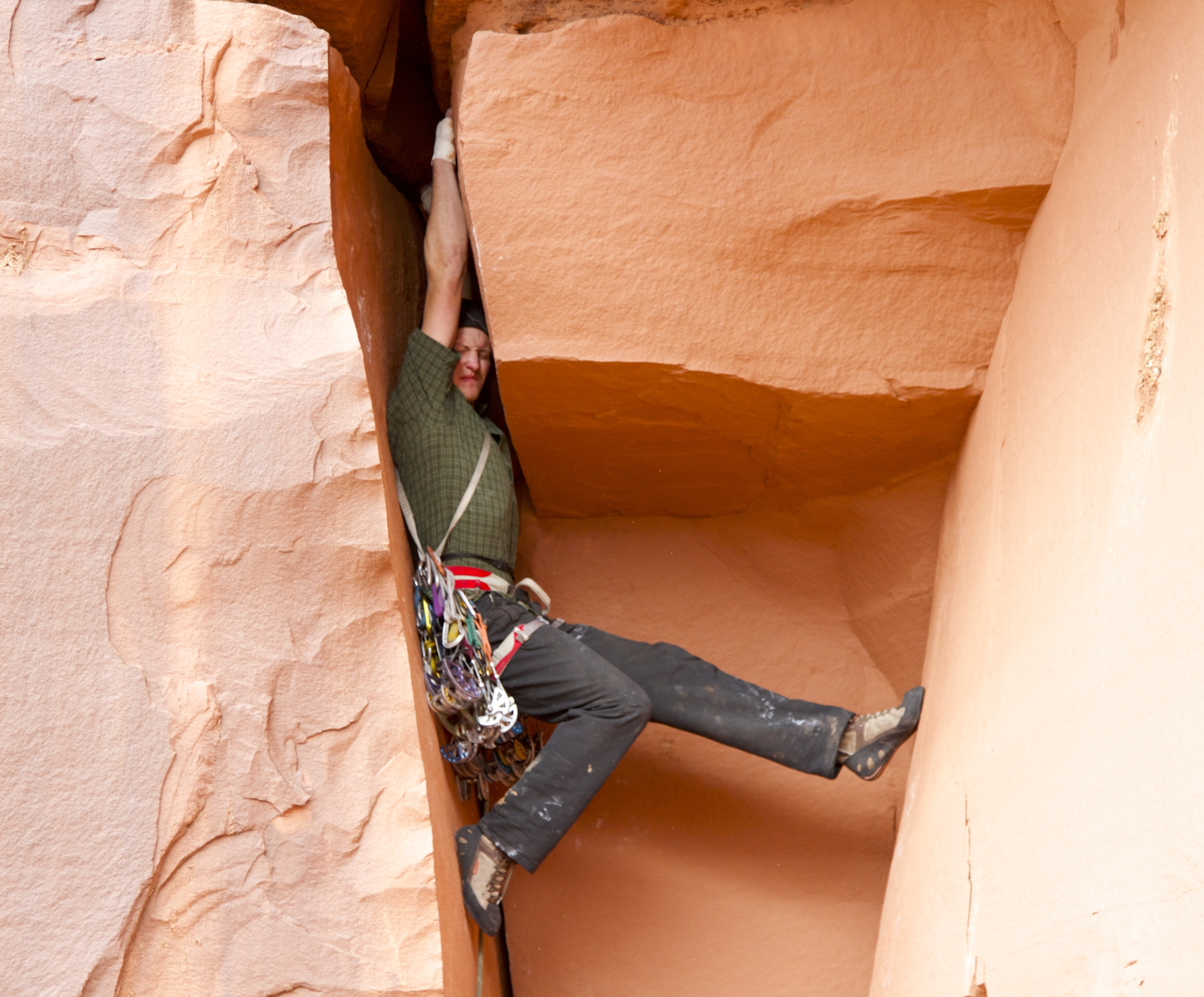
Off-width climb

A crack that is too wide for effective hand or foot jams but is not as large as a chimney. See big bro.
on belay
American climbing command when they are ready to be belayed. Replied to with "belay on".
on-sight

To ascend a route on the first attempt, with no prior beta; with beta, it is a flash.
open book
An inside angle in the rock. See also dihedral.
open project
A route that was bolted by someone (e.g. they bought and installed the bolts) but who was unsuccessful in redpointing it, and it is now considered to be "open" to any climber to try; sometimes the original bolter will leave colored tape on the first bolt(s) to note the route is "not open".
overhang
A section of rock or ice that is angled beyond the vertical. See roof.

== P ==
paddling
A multi-move dyno where the climber must move quickly through a sequence of intermediate hand holds (neither of which can hold the climber for any period), with their arms mimicking a paddling action and their feet usually in mid-air, before getting to a secure position. See also campusing.
passive protection
Type of protection that remains static during a fall; opposite of active protection. See nuts and hexcentrics.
peak-bagging
To systematically attain every peak of a designated class of summits (e.g. eight-thousanders), sometimes under prescribed conditions (e.g. in winter), and/or in a prescribed climbing style (e.g. no supplementary oxygen).
peg
A piton.
pendulum
1. Swinging on a taut anchored rope to reach the next hold in a pendulum traverse.
2. A swing experienced during a fall caused by the last piece of protection being far to one side.
permadraw
A quickdraw but made from a steel cable with steel carabiners that is permanently fixed to the bolt; longer wearing than aluminum quickdraws, and climbers do not need to retrieve them after a climb.
personal anchor system

An adjustable attachment point from a climber to a fixed anchor, give them flexibility to perform other tasks.
picket

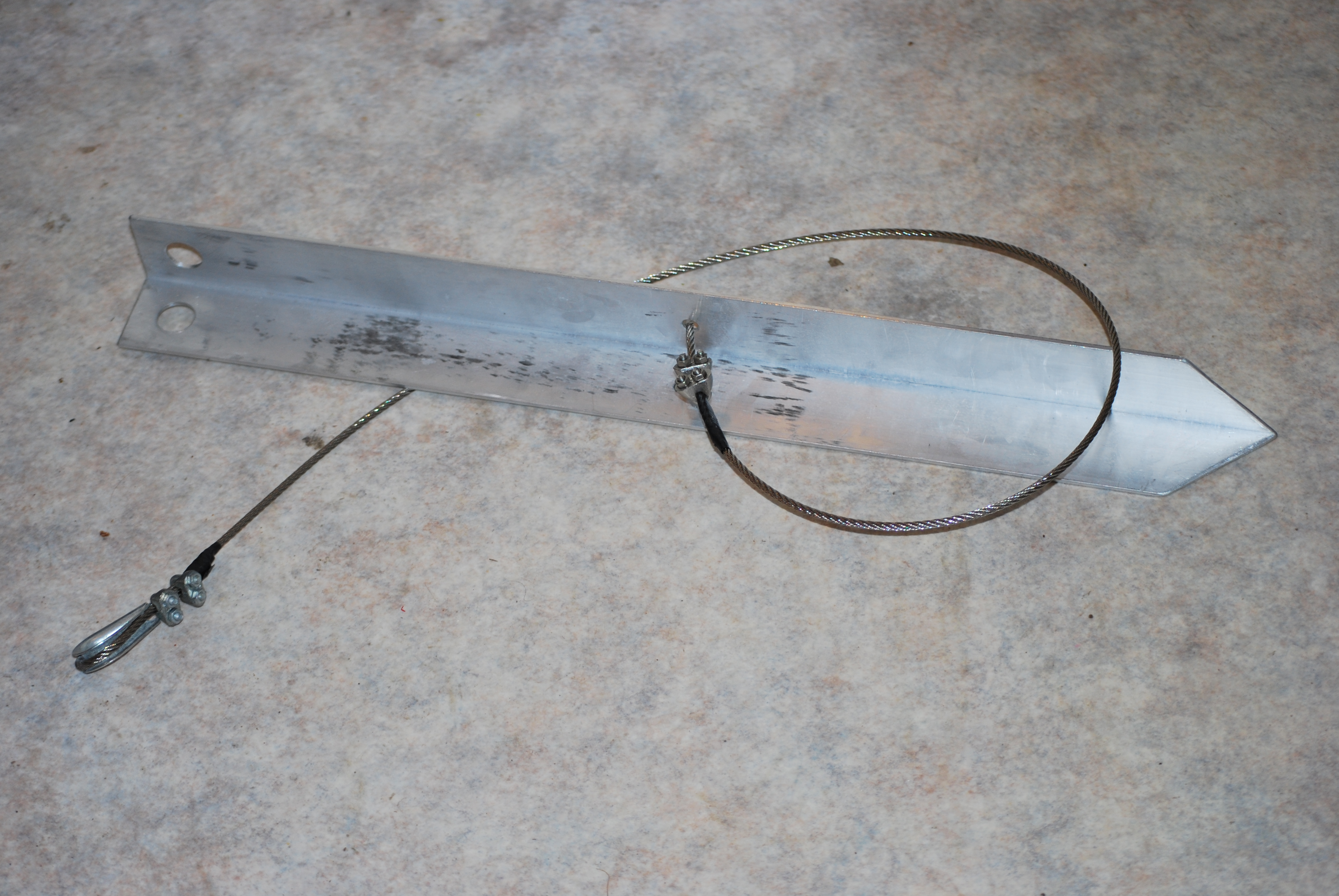
Picket

A long, tubular rod driven into the snow to provide a makeshift anchor.
pinch hold

A hold which must be "pinched" between the fingers to use it.
pinkpoint
Lead climbing where the protection (e.g. quickdraws) are pre-installed. See also greenpoint and redpoint.
pitch
The climbing route between two belay points with a "full pitch" being the length of the rope, circa 50 metres (160 ft).
piton

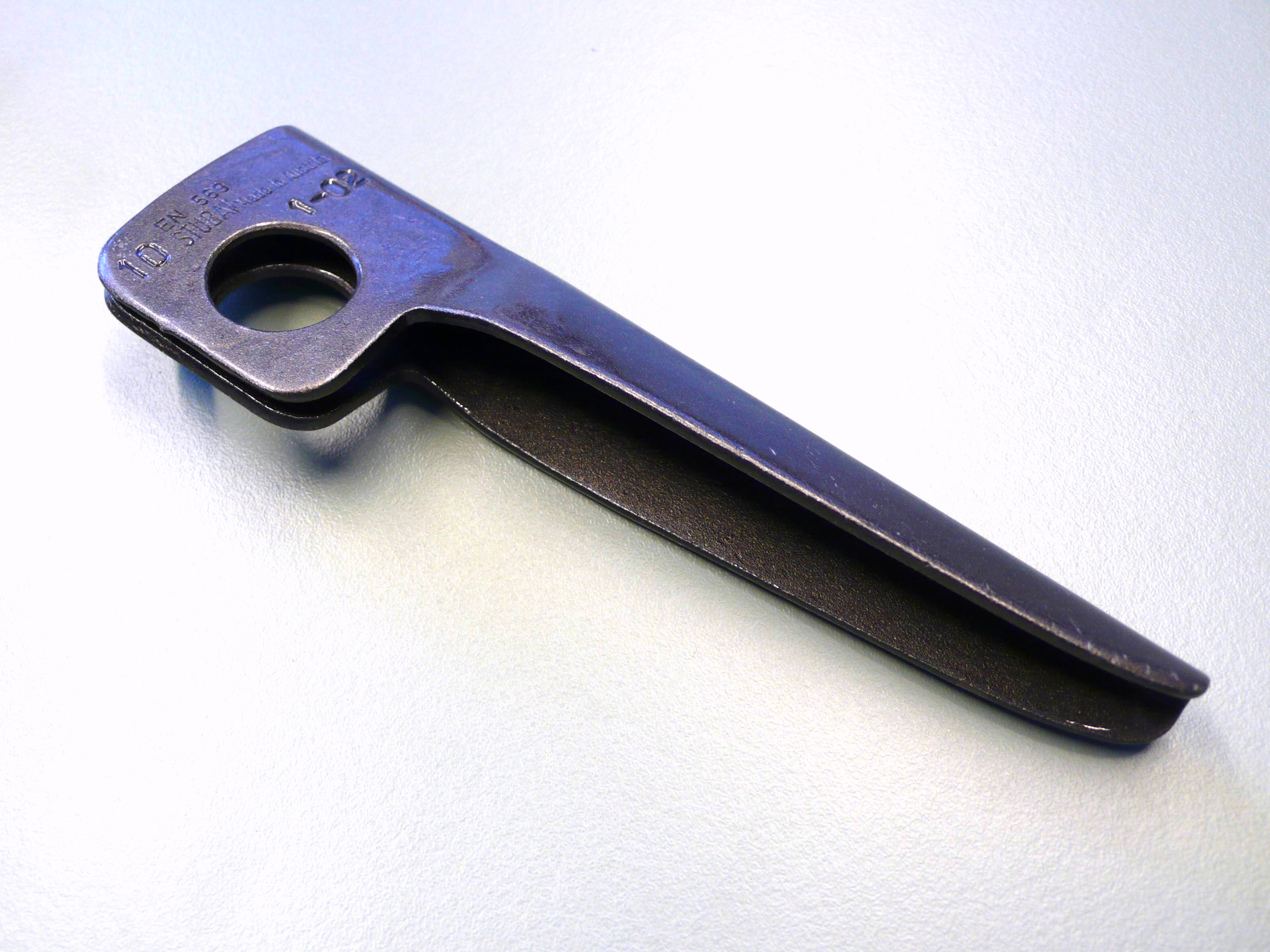
Piton

A flat or angled metal blade of steel for protection that incorporates a clipping hole for a carabiner or a ring in its body that is hammered into cracks; comes in a wide range of designs and types for different crack types and widths; common in aid climbing, big wall climbing, and alpine climbing. See also RURP.
piton catcher
A clip-on string fastened to a piton when inserting or removing, so as to avoid loss.
plunge step
An aggressive step pattern for descending on hard or steep-angle snow.
pogo
A dynamic, momentum-based, and often diagonal, move where one leg swings wildly to generate upward force, enabling the climber to reach distant holds with reduced upper body strain.
poop tube

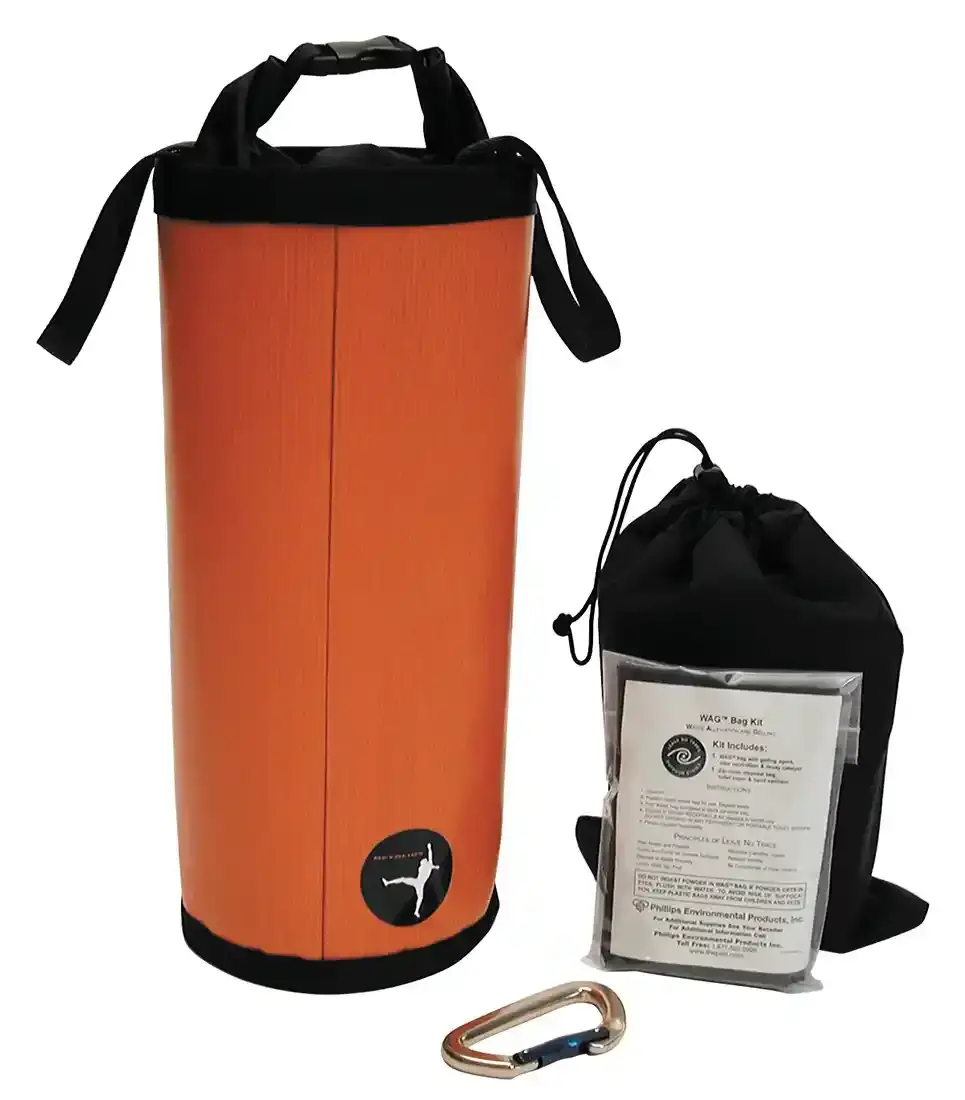
Poop tube

A PVC tube-shaped container for carrying out human feces during multi-day or big wall climbs.
portaledge

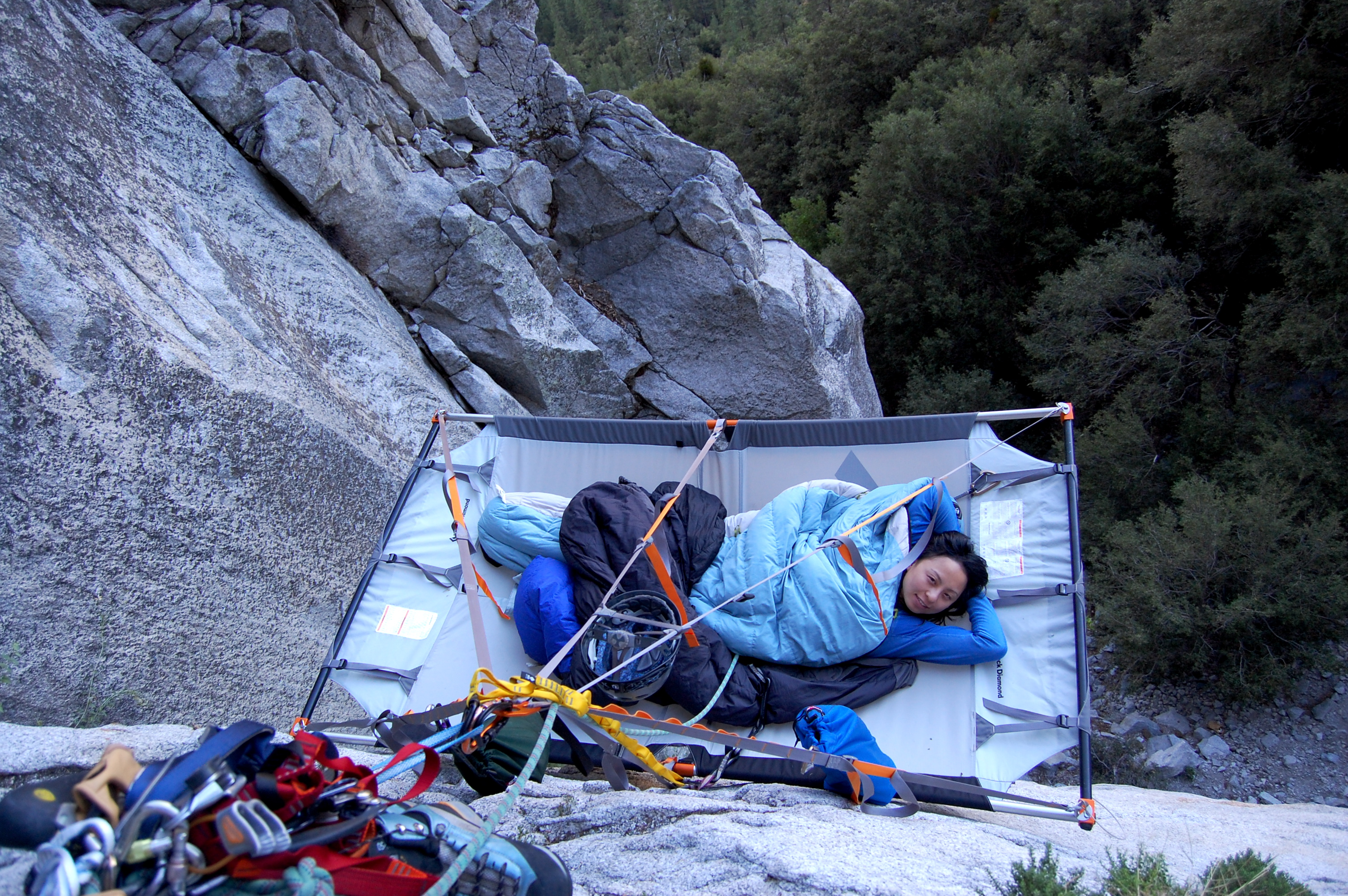
Portaledge

A lightweight foldaway tent platform used in big wall climbing to create a rest point on a sheer rock face.
positive
A hold or part of a hold with a surface facing upwards, or away from the direction it is pulled, facilitating use. A positive hold is the opposite of a sloper.
pressure breathing

Forcefully exhaling to facilitate O_{2}/CO_{2} exchange at altitude.
problem

Used in bouldering to describe the sequence of moves to be overcome.
progress capture device

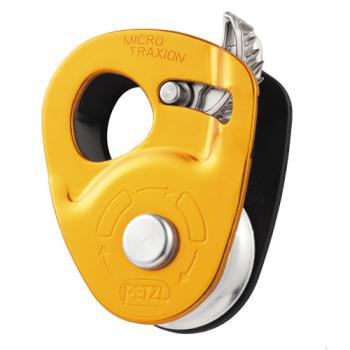
Petzl Micro Traxion

A mechanical climbing device that allows the rope to move through it in only one direction, examples being the Petzl Micro Traxion or the Camp Lift; PCDs are used in many climbing tasks including gear hauling, belaying, top rope solo climbing and in simul-climbing. See also Self-locking device.
project

An attempt over time to climb a new (worldwide or personal) route or boulder problem as a "project".
protection

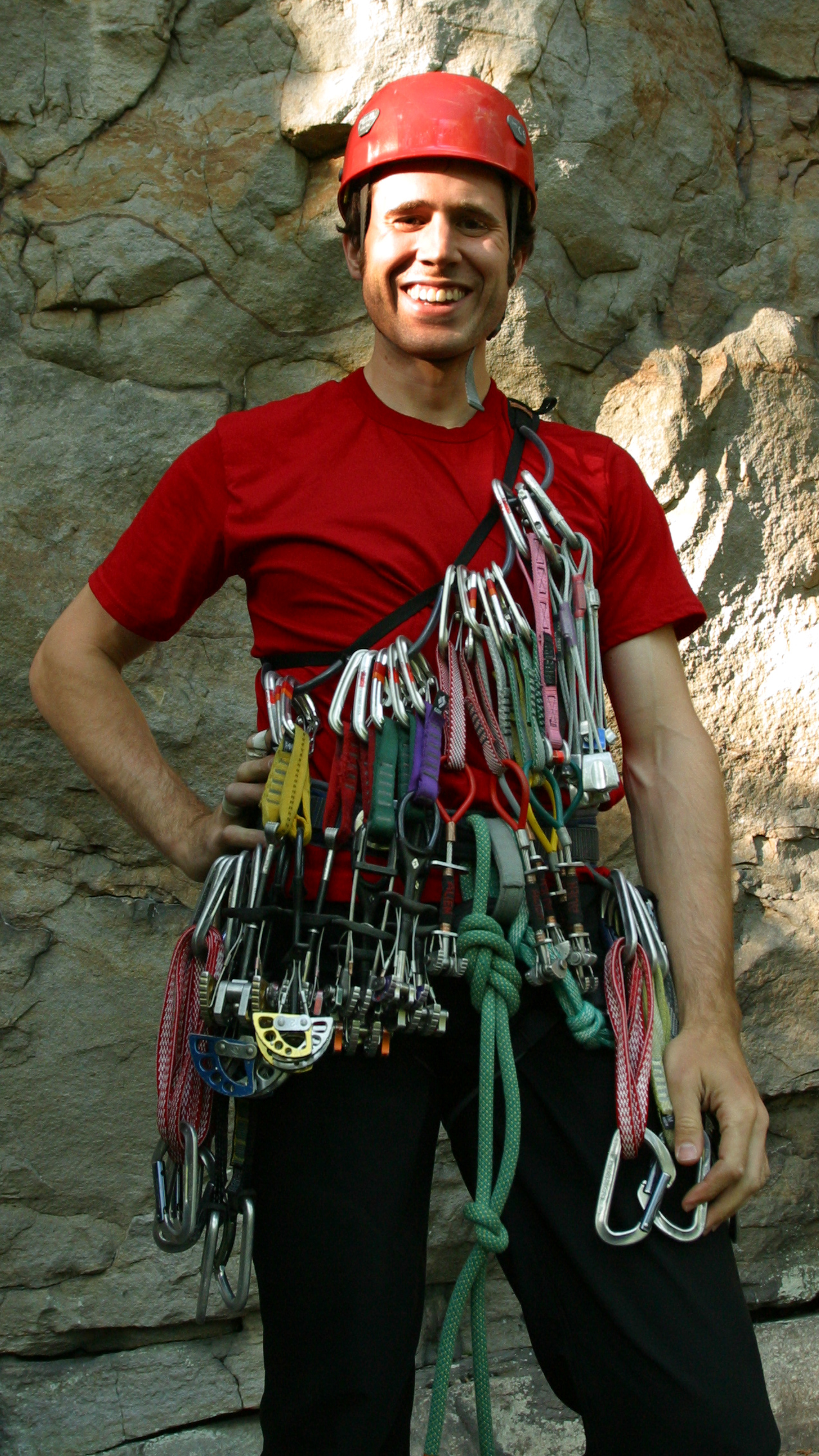
Carrying protection

Equipment for arresting lead climber falls, or to create anchors for abseils or belays. Examples are passive (bolts, copperheads, hexcentrics, ice screws, nuts, quickdraws, and skyhooks), and active (cams, friends, tricams).
Prusik
A knot used for ascending a fixed rope, named after Austrian Karl Prusik, who developed this knot in 1931.
pulley

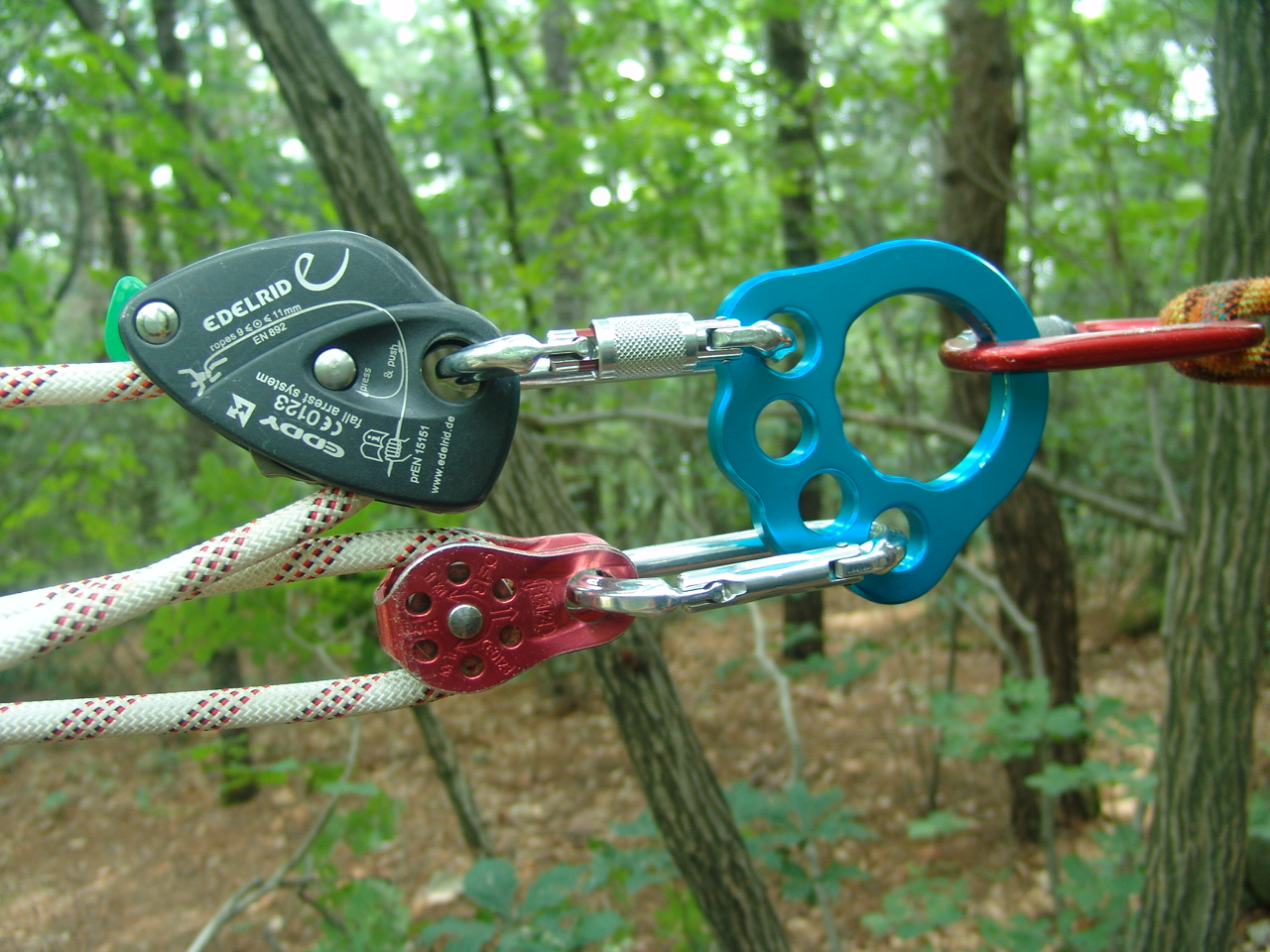
Pulley (in red)

The lightweight mechanical pully that has wide application in climbing including big wall climbing (especially gear hauling) and crevasse rescue and in tyrolean traverseing.
pump

The accumulation of metabolic waste products in the forearm(s) so that holding a basic grip becomes impossible.

== Q ==
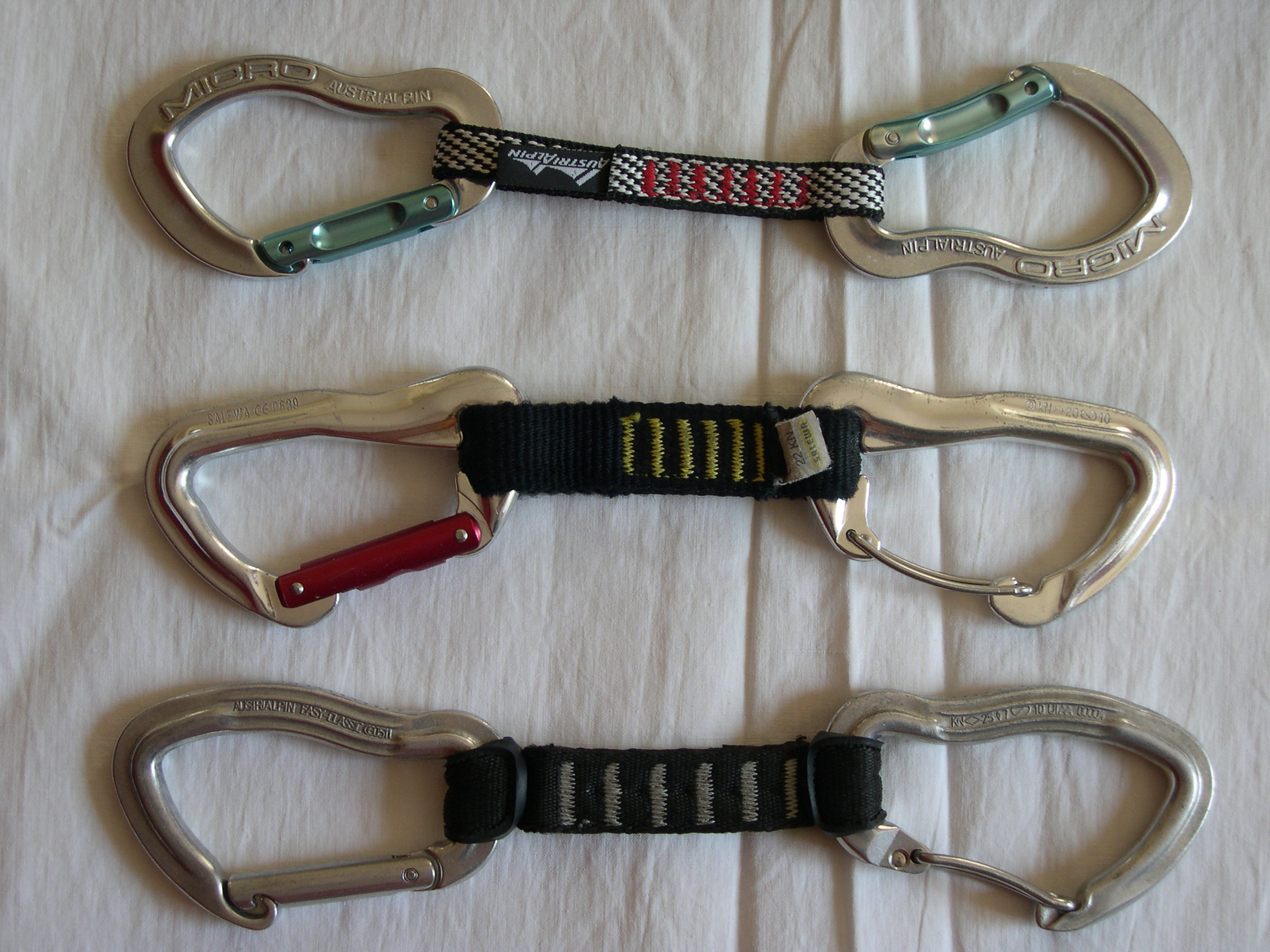
Quickdraws

quickdraw

A piece of climbing protection that is used to attach a running rope to an anchor or a bolt. See permadraw.
quicklink

A screw-type oval-shaped stainless steel carabiner which is smaller than the normal carabiner.

== R ==
rack

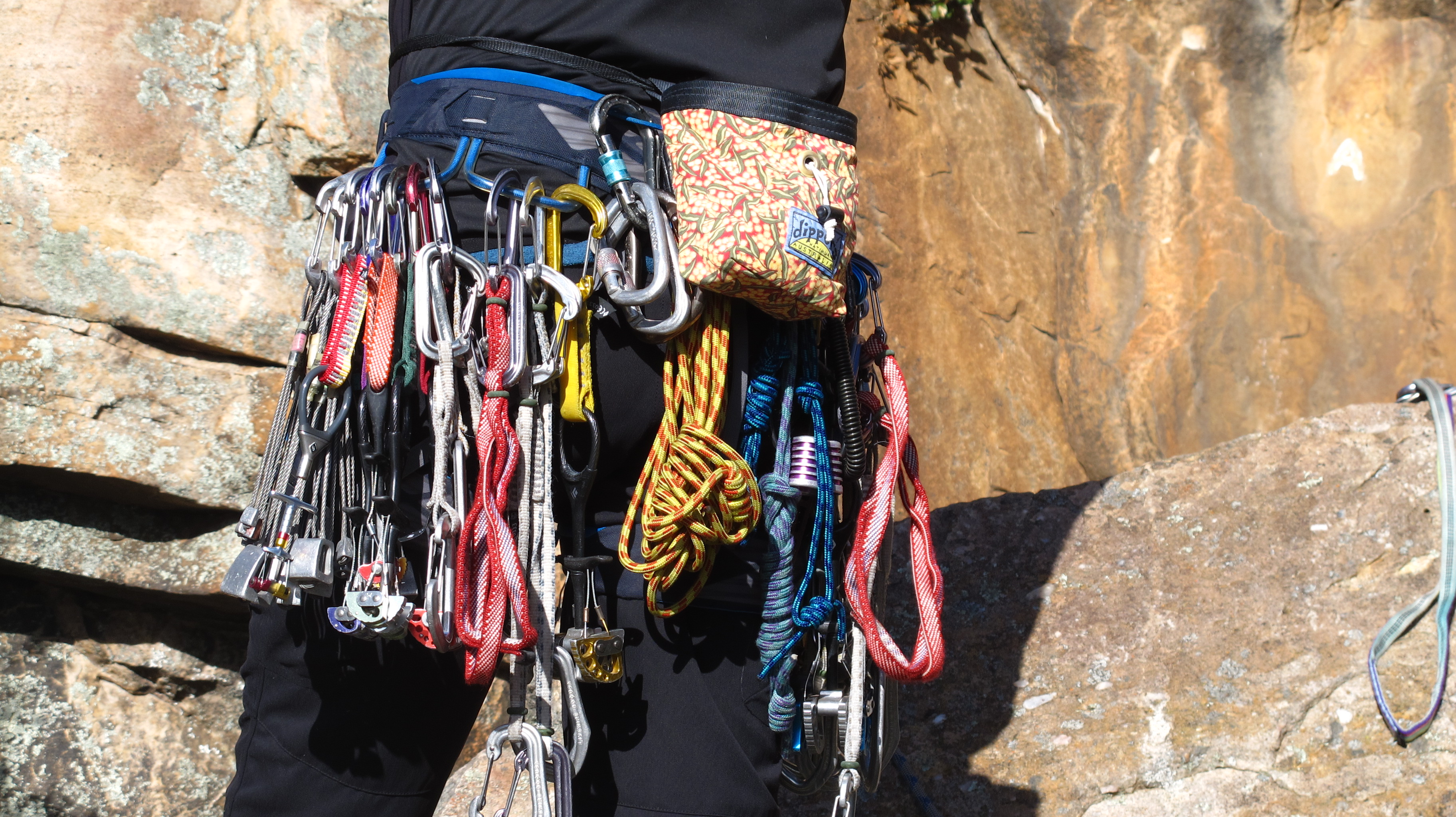
A traditional climbing rack on a harness

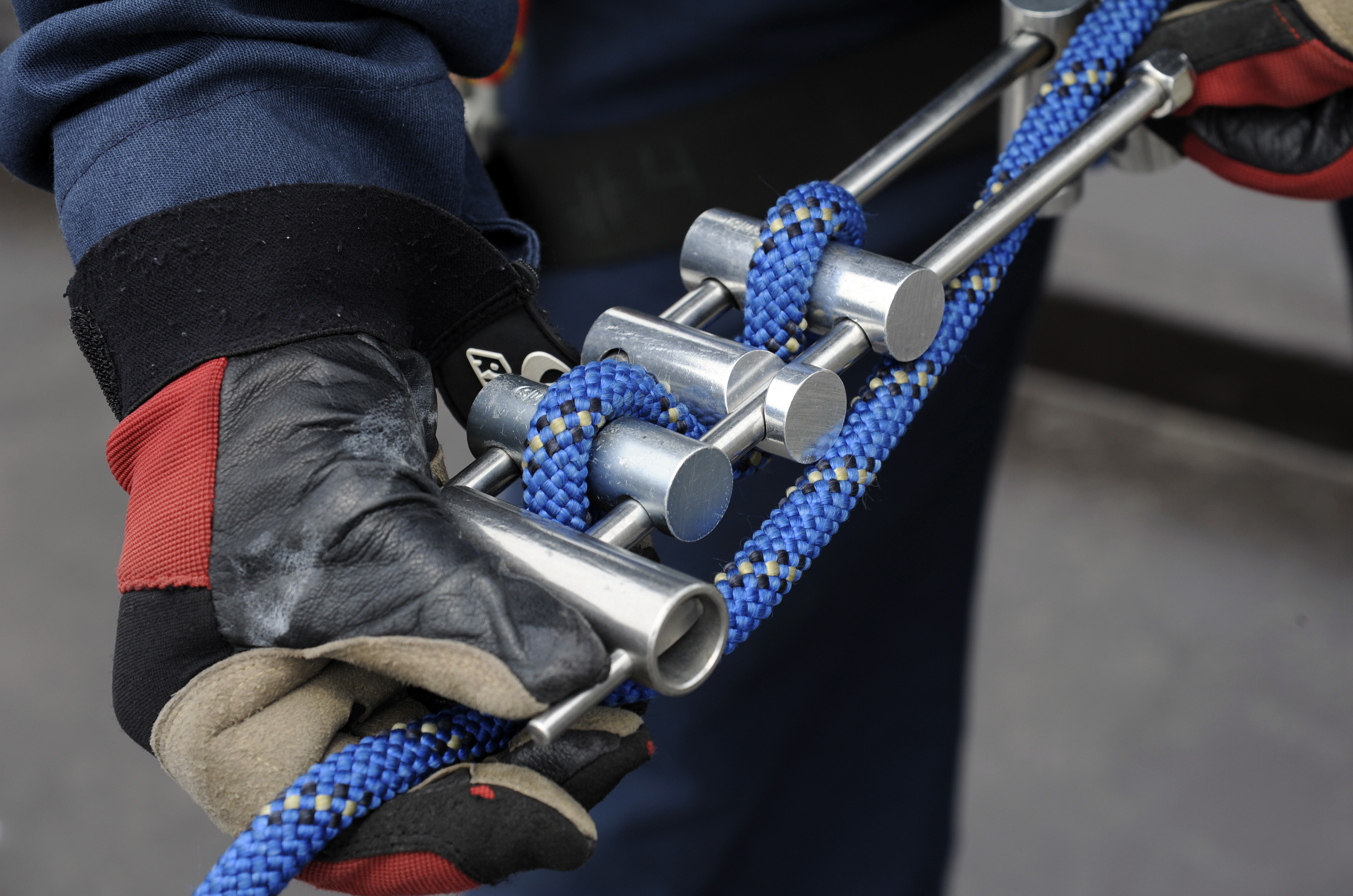
A rack

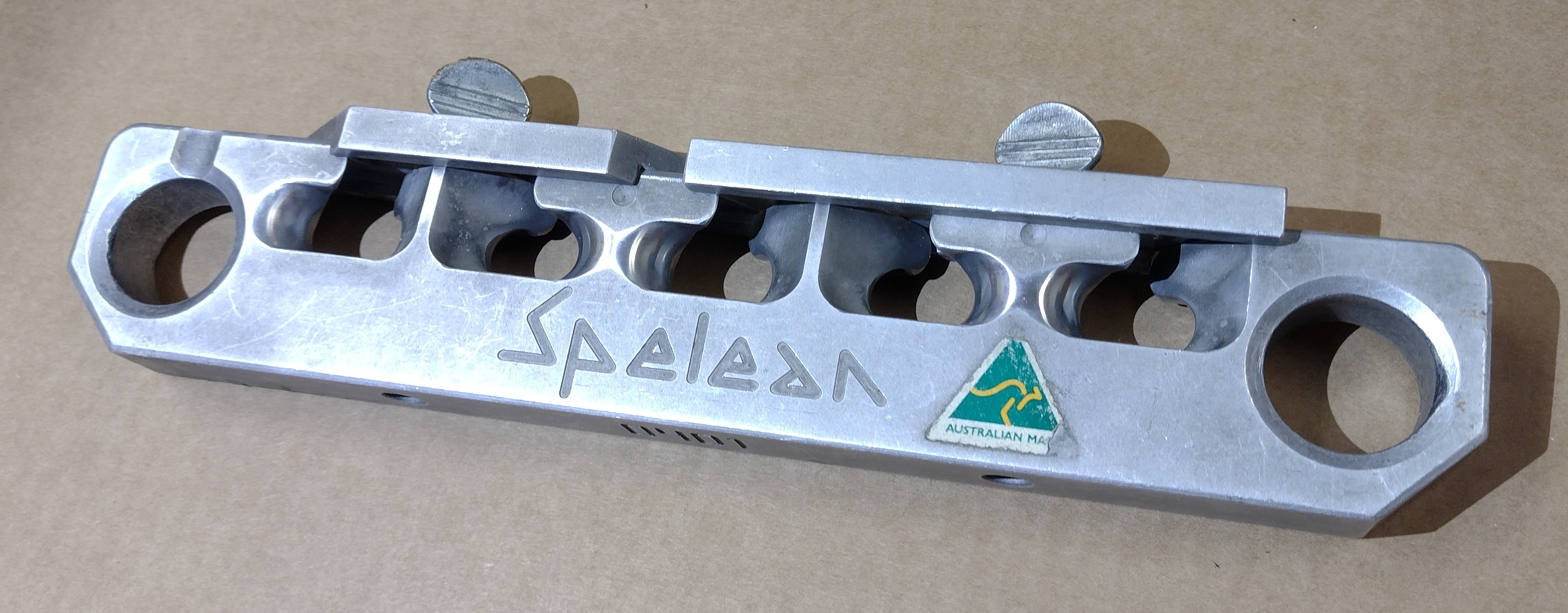
A whale tail (rack)

1. Name given to the collective set of protection equipment carried by a lead climber up a climb.
2. A type of heavy-duty "all-weather" descender known as an "abseil rack" or a "rappel rack", consisting of metal bars on a U-shaped chassis, which is frequently used in caving. An alternative heavier device is a "whaletail" (also "whale tail") which is a machined block often used by rescuers.
rappel
See abseil.
rating
See grade.
re-belay

Secondary or intermediate fixed anchor point(s) along the length of a fixed rope (i.e. in addition to the main anchor at the top of the fixed rope) that is used to avoid edges that could increase rope wear.
rebolting
The replacement of older bolts on an existing bolted sport climbing route.
redpoint

Free climbing a route by leading it after having failed it or practiced it beforehand (e.g. by hangdogging, headpointing, or top roping). A route climbed on the first-ever attempt (and no practice), it is an onsight or a flash. See first free ascent.
removable bolt

A removable protection bolt, similar in concept to a sliding nut, but shaped to fit into a drilled hole; popular in aid climbing.
rest step
An energy-saving mountaineering technique where the unweighted (uphill) leg is rested between each forward step, by "locking" the knee of the rear leg.
retro-bolting
The addition of bolts to a route that has already been ascended using traditional climbing protection. The technique is controversial, with ethical debate on the issues of improving climber safety versus protecting the integrity of the original traditional climbing challenge.
rigging plate

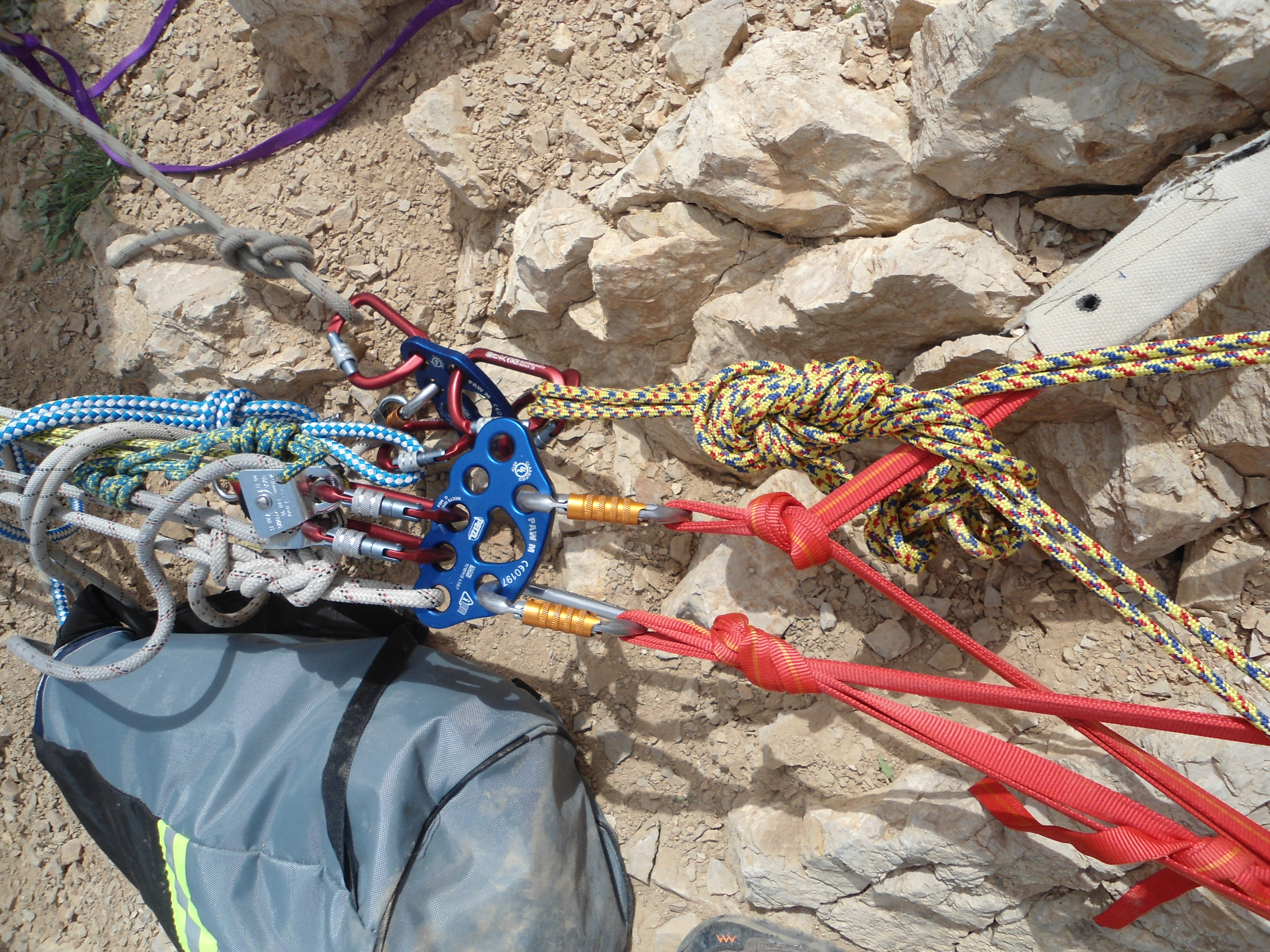
Blue rigging plate

A light metal plate with several holes that can be used as a multi-anchor device that several items can be attached to at a belay station, notable versions include the Petzl PAW.
ripped
Term to denote when a piece of protection failed and "ripped-out" of the rock. See zipper fall.
rivet hanger

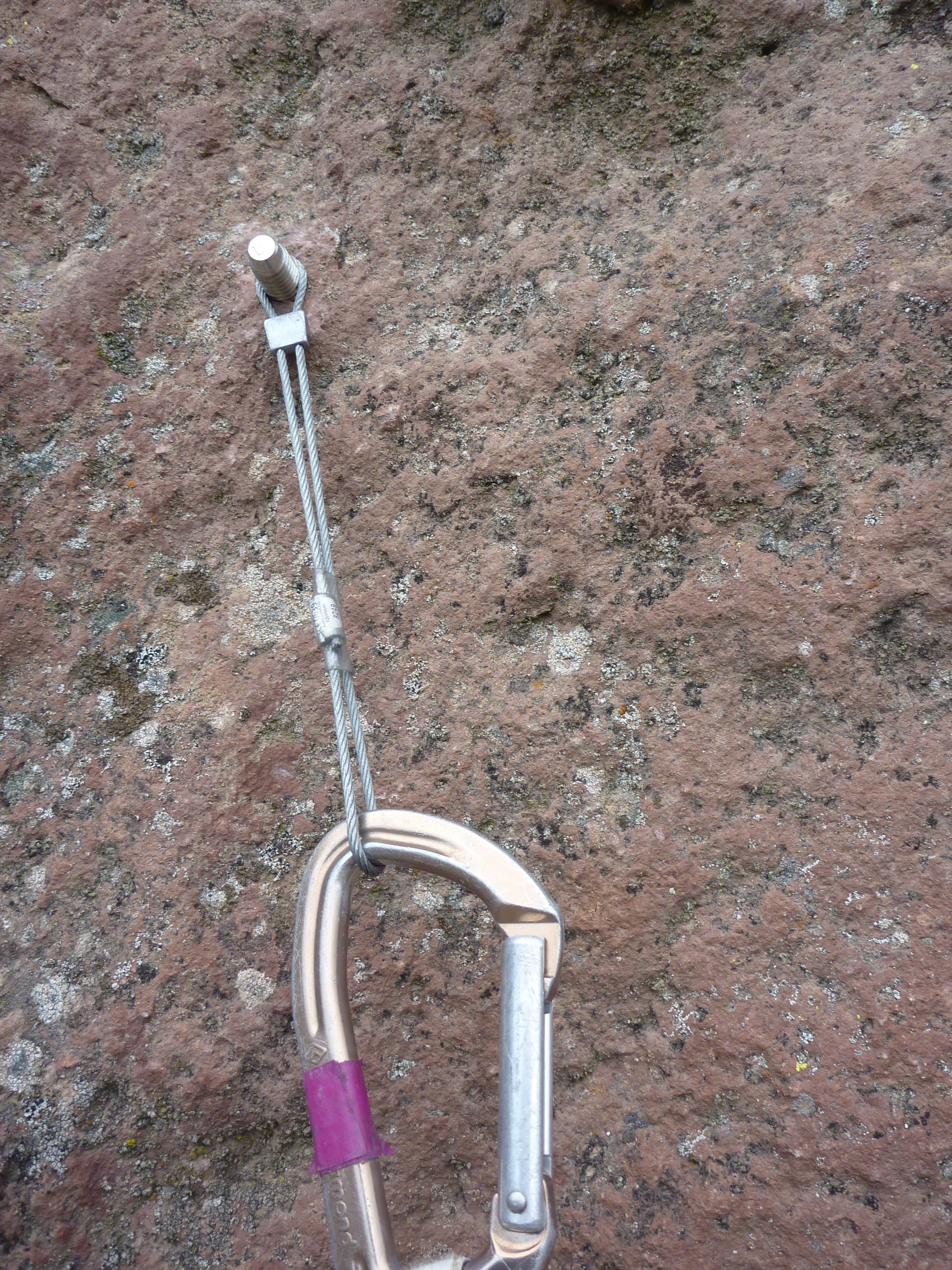
Rivet hanger

A piece of aid climbing equipment used by the lead climber to attach to bolt runner rivets in the rock. See also carrot bolt.
rock hammer

A lightweight hammer with a short handle used for inserting pitons, bolts, and copperheads in aid climbing and big wall climbing. See also ice hammer.
rockover move
A rock-climbing technique where the body weight is transferred (or "rocked-over") to the raised up-hill leg to reach a higher hold.
rodeo clipping
To clip into the first piece of protection from the ground by swinging a loop of rope so that it is caught by a pre-placed carabiner.
roof

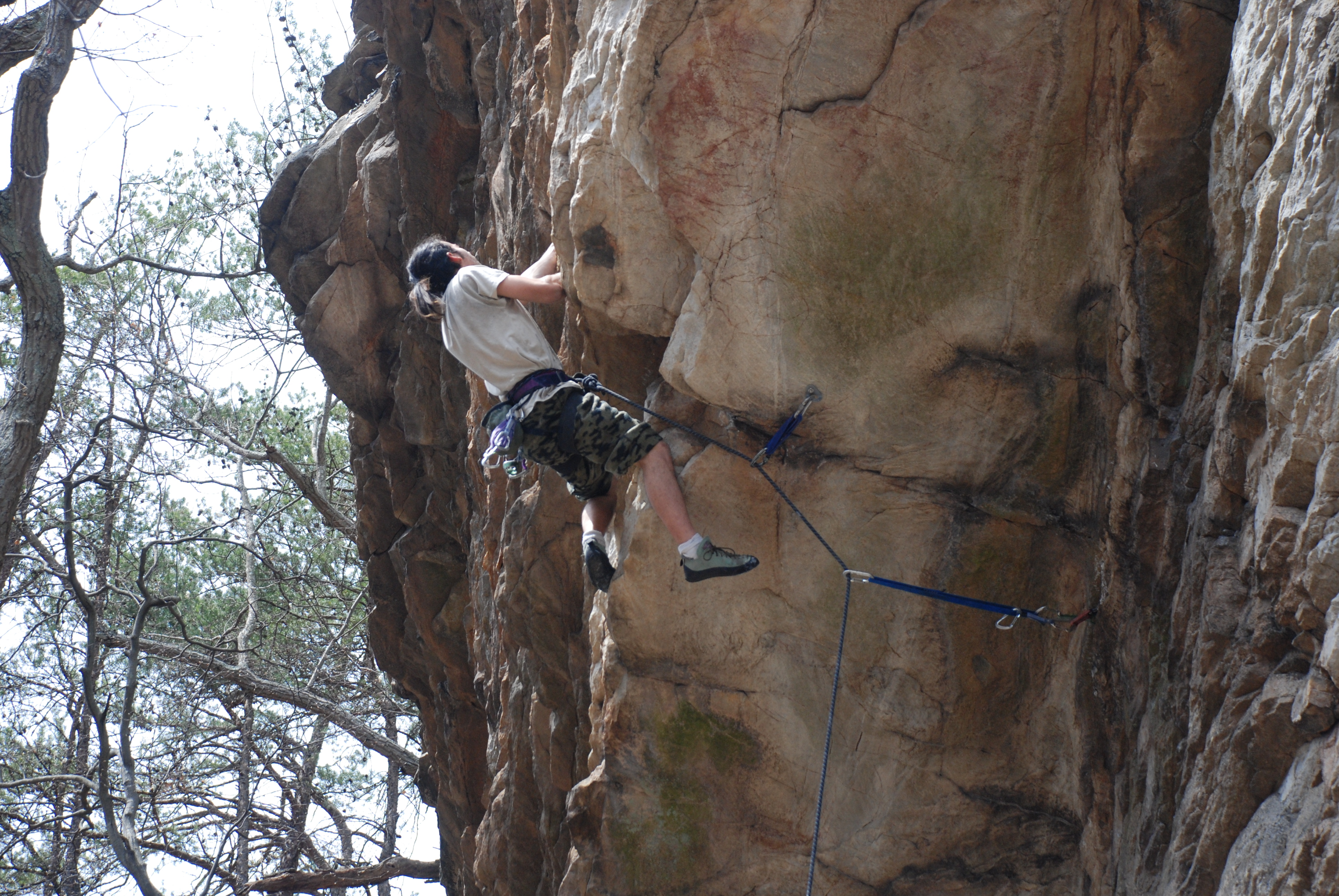
Climbing a roof

An overhang that is so steep, it becomes horizontal.
rope bag
Specialist lightweight but hardwearing bag for carrying a climbing rope.
rope drag
See drag.
rope jumping
Jumping a full rope-length from the top of a rock face with the rope attached to a fixed anchor like a bungee cord.
rope team
See simul climbing.
rose move
A move in which the crossing arm goes behind the other arm and is so far extended that the body is forced to twist until it ends up facing away from the rock. It was introduced by Antoine Le Menestrel to climb a route in Buoux called La rose et le vampire 8b (5.13d) in 1985.
route
See climbing route.
RP
A small protection nut on a wire for tiny cracks with marginal holding power; named after Roland Pauligk.
runner
1. In the US, a sling is made from nylon-blend materials, used by climbers for a multitude of purposes.
2. In the UK, any item of protection placed by the lead climber to reduce the length of a fall.
runout

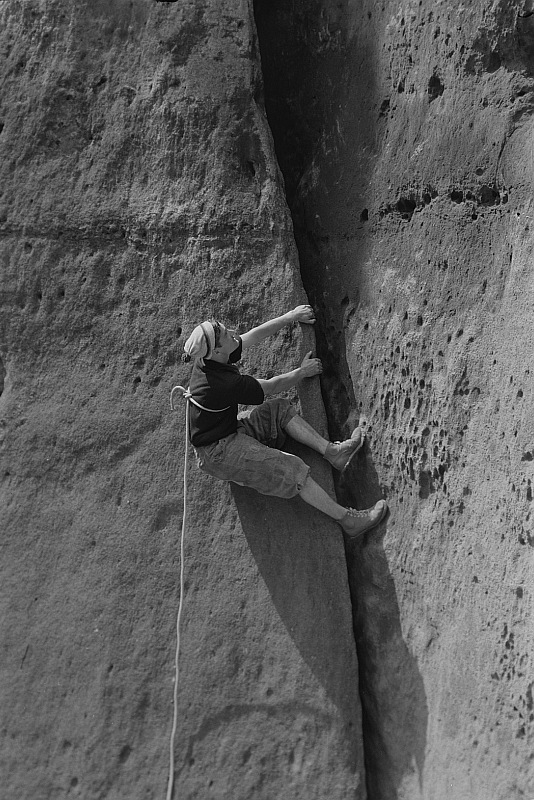
A long runout

In a term in lead climbing for the distance between points of good protection; in the grading of climbs, routes with long runouts have higher adjectival "E" grade (British system), or an R/Xor even X suffix (American system). See ground fall.
RURP

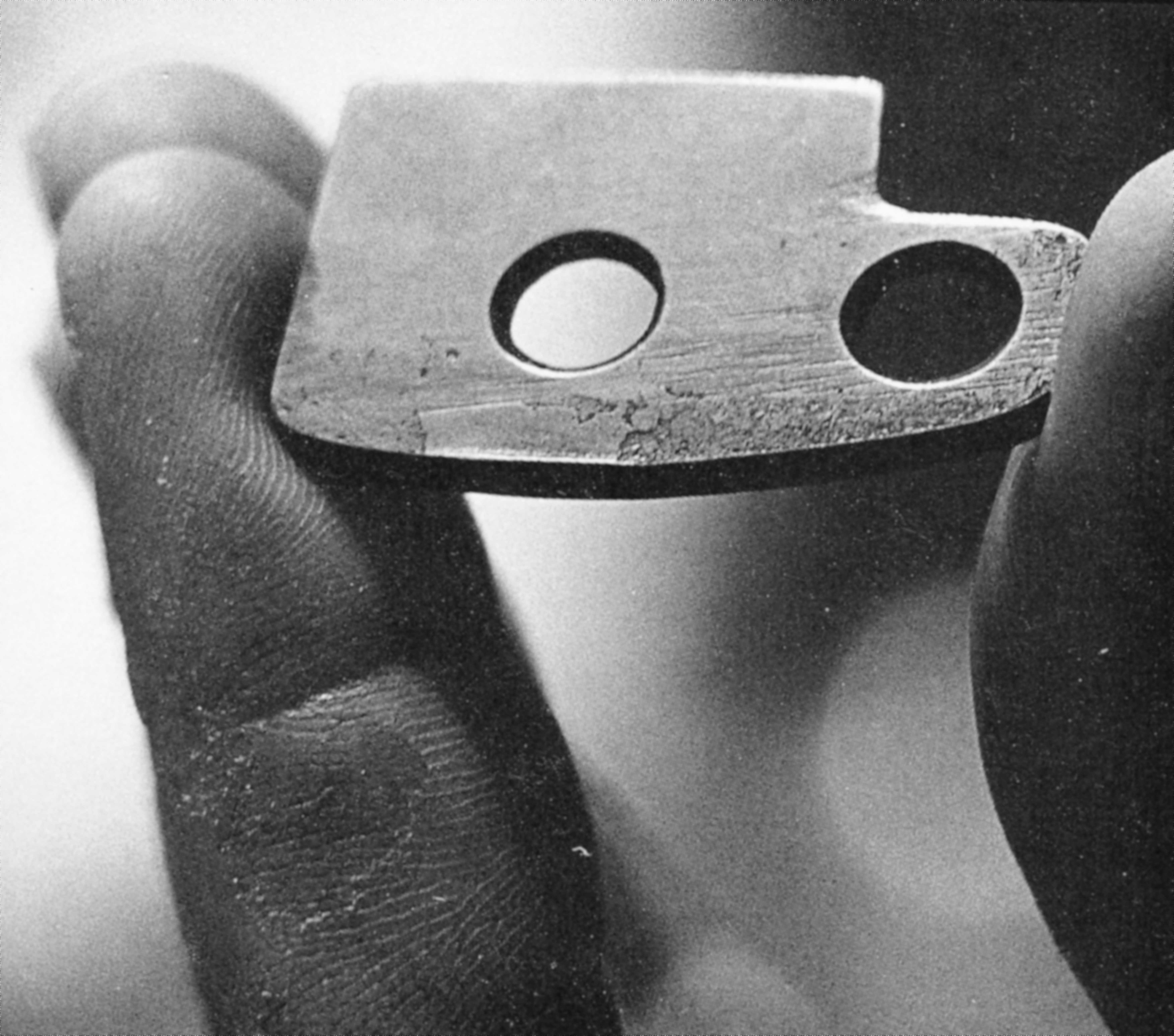
RURP

A miniature, postage stamp-sized chrome-moly square piton, tied to a wire or rope and hammered into cracks; created by Yvon Chouinard in 1960 for extreme aid climbing routes in Yosemite; acronym for realized ultimate reality piton.
R/X
A suffix used in the yosemite decimal system for traditional climbing routes that have poor possibilities for protection where any fall could be serious (e.g. Master's Edge). See X.

== S ==
S-grade

Part of the deep-water soloing system for grading the objective danger difficulty of DWS climbing routes, which goes: S0, S1, S2, and S3. See also X.
saddle
A high pass between two peaks, larger than a col.
sandbag
A rock climb with a much lower official climbing grade than probably deserved; sometimes due to a "trick-move" at the crux that once learned, does make the route easier; or due to overly conservative grading.
scrambling
A type of climbing somewhere between hiking and graded rock climbing; involves climbing the easiest grades.
screamer
1. Shock absorbing sling designed to reduce peak loads in a climbing system. Very commonly used for winter / ice climbing. Made of a nylon webbing structure consisting of one large loop sewn in multiple places to make a shorter length.
2. A British term for a large whipper fall.
scree
Small, loose rocks, at the base of a cliff or slope; distinguished from talus.
screw on

A small climbing hold screwed onto the wall on a climbing wall.
second

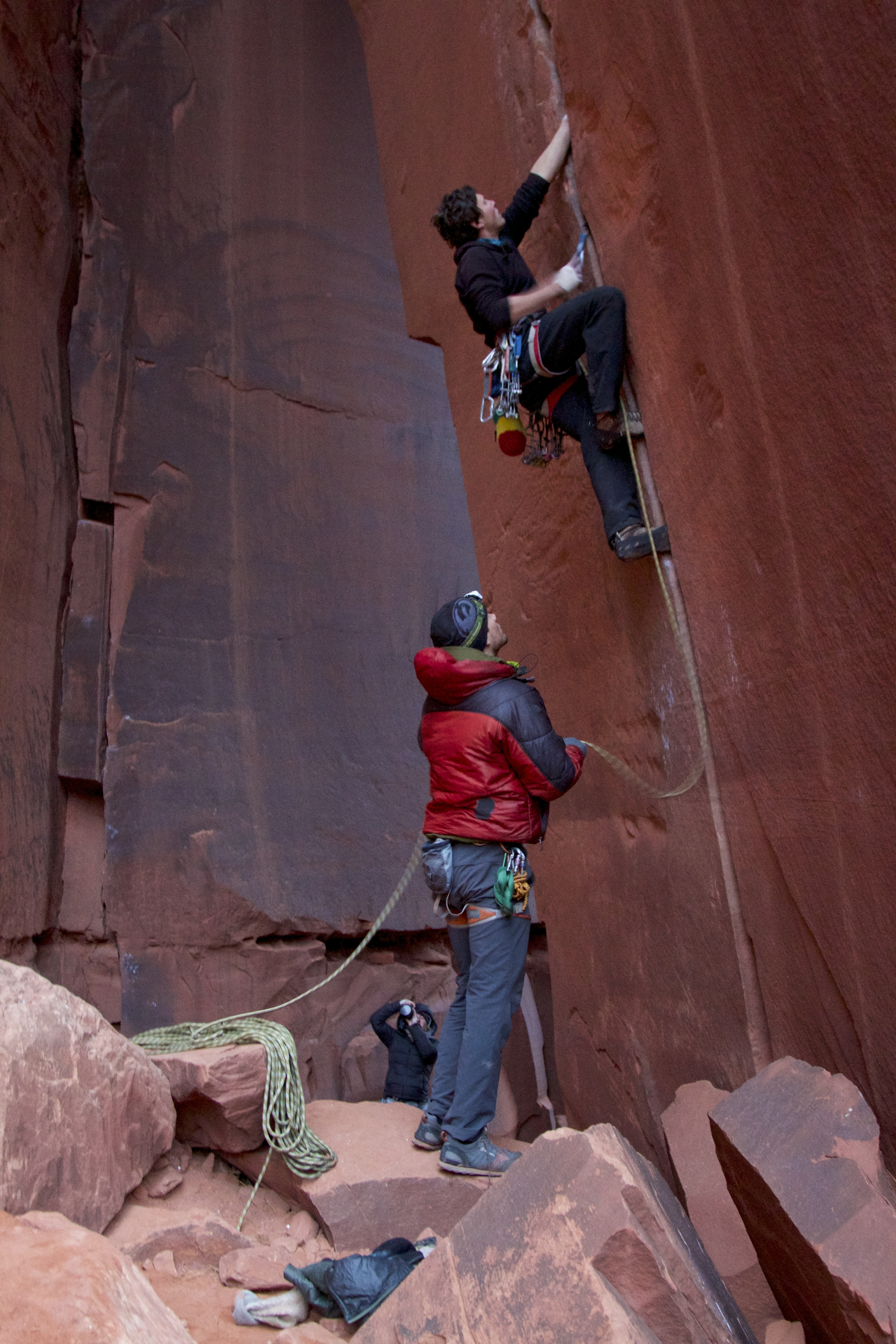
Lead climber (right) and second (left)

A climber who follows the lead climber; often acts as the belayer.
self-arrest
Using the pick of an ice axe to arrest a fall, or to control a glissade.
self-belay

The act of using a mechanical device for belaying in solo climbing. See self-locking device.
self-locking device

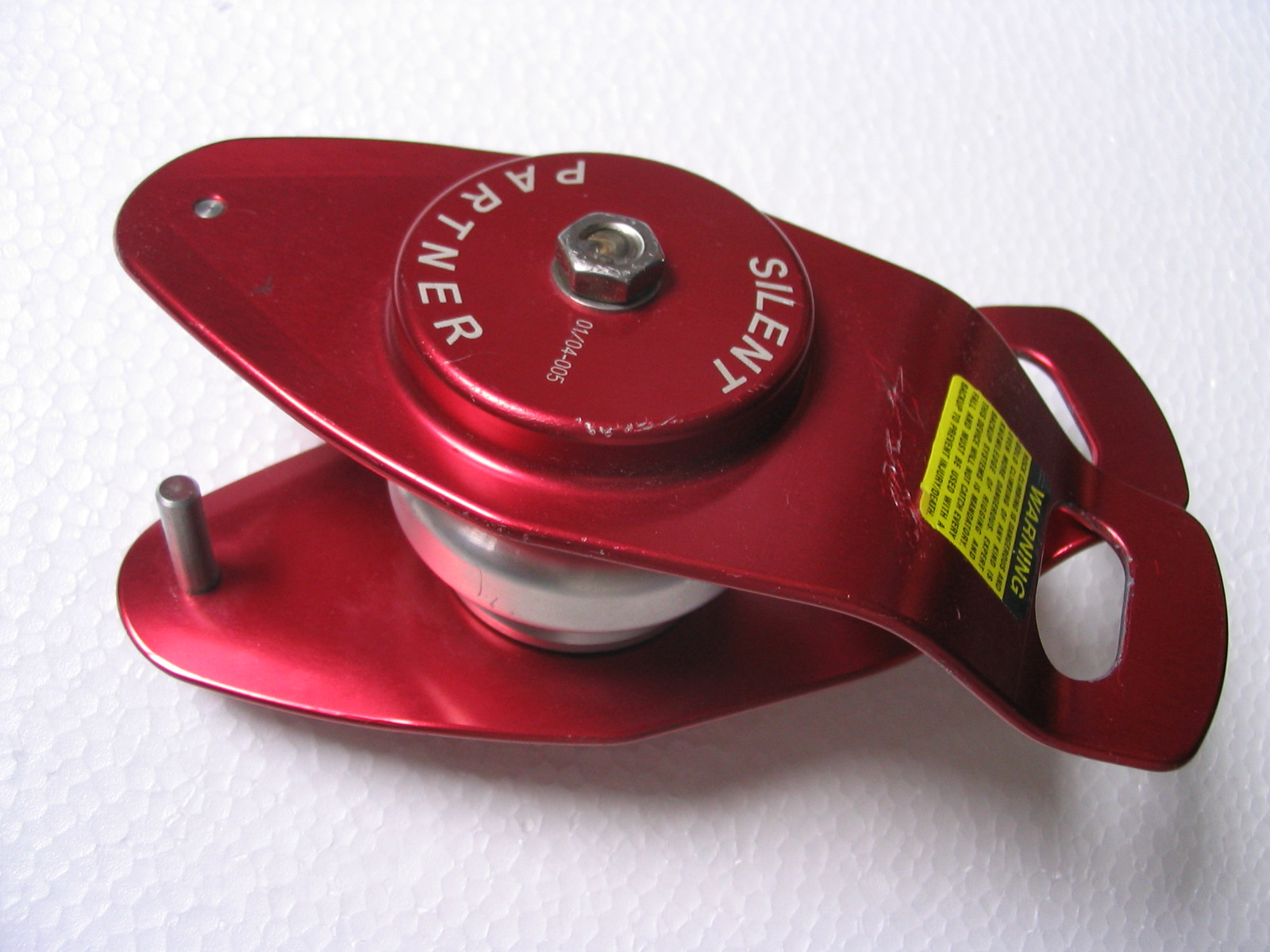
Self-locking device

A device used in solo climbing, and particularly rope solo climbing, to automatically arrest falls. Examples include Wren's Silent Partner. See also progress capture device. Compare automatic belay.
self rescue
Actions taken by a climber(s) to execute their own rescue or recovery from a difficult or dangerous situation.
send
To free climb a route, via an on-sight, flash, or redpoint.
serac
A large tower of ice on the surface of a glacier; falling seracs are a serious hazard to mountaineers.
SERENE
Acronym for building anchors; stands for Strong, Equalised, Redundant, Efficient, No Extension. See also ERNEST.
sewing-machine leg

The involuntary vibration of the leg due to fatigue and/or panic and stress.
shadow match
A rock climbing move to quickly switch hands on a hold that can only fit one hand at a time.
sharp end
The end of the rope that is attached to the lead climber, to denote the more serious activity they are undertaking compared to the belayer.
short fixing
An advanced big wall climbing technique where the lead climber fixes the rope at an anchor to allow the second to ascend using jumars, while the leader climber then continues to ascend in a rope solo climbing fashion; unlike simul climbing, neither is belaying the other.
side pull

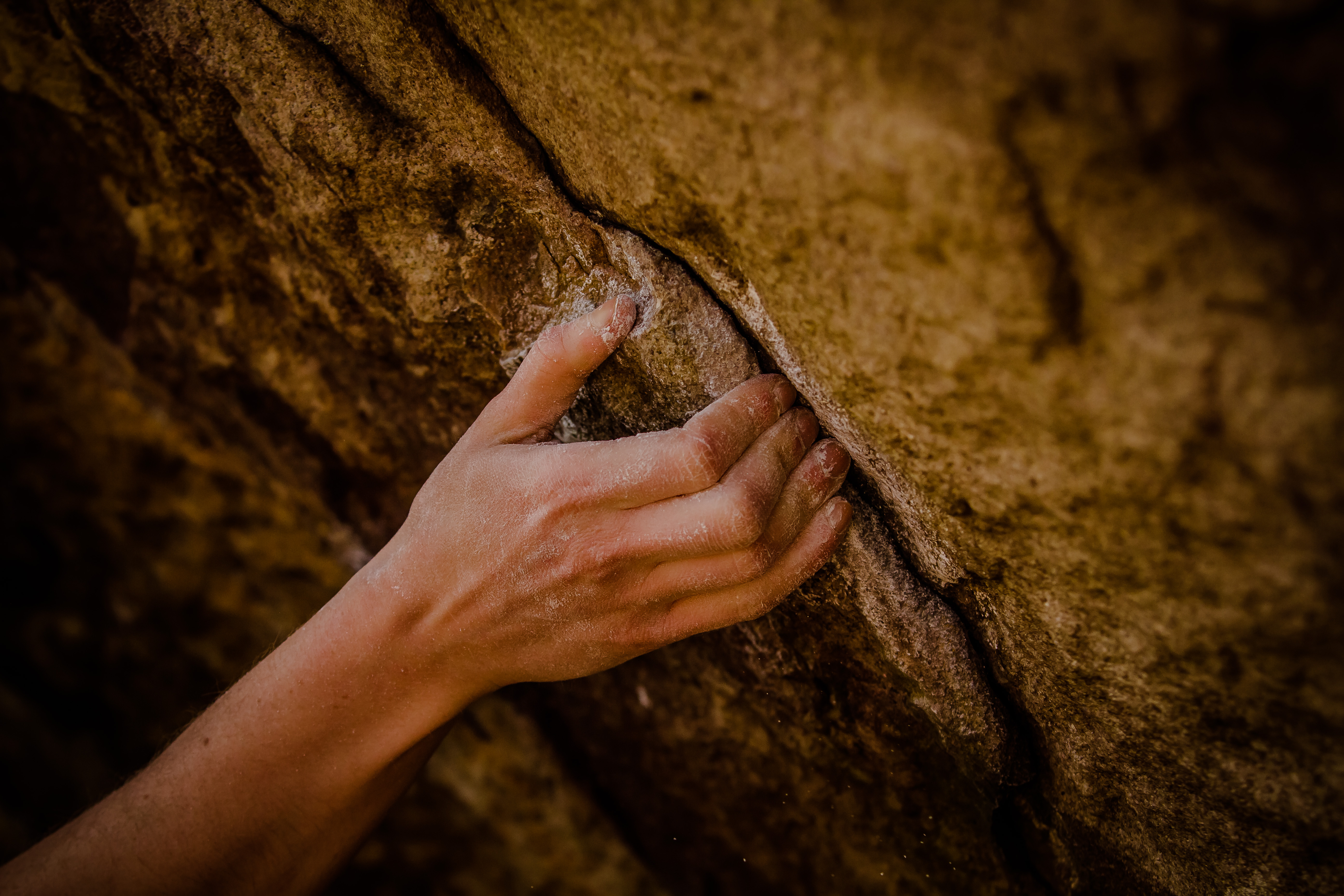
A side pull

A vertical hold that needs to be gripped with a sideways pull towards the body.
simul climbing

An advanced technique in which two climbers move simultaneously upward, with the leader placing protection that the second removes as they advance. A protection capture device (PCD) may also be used.
single-rope technique
The use of a single rope where one or both ends of the rope are attached to fixed anchor points. See fixed rope.
sit start

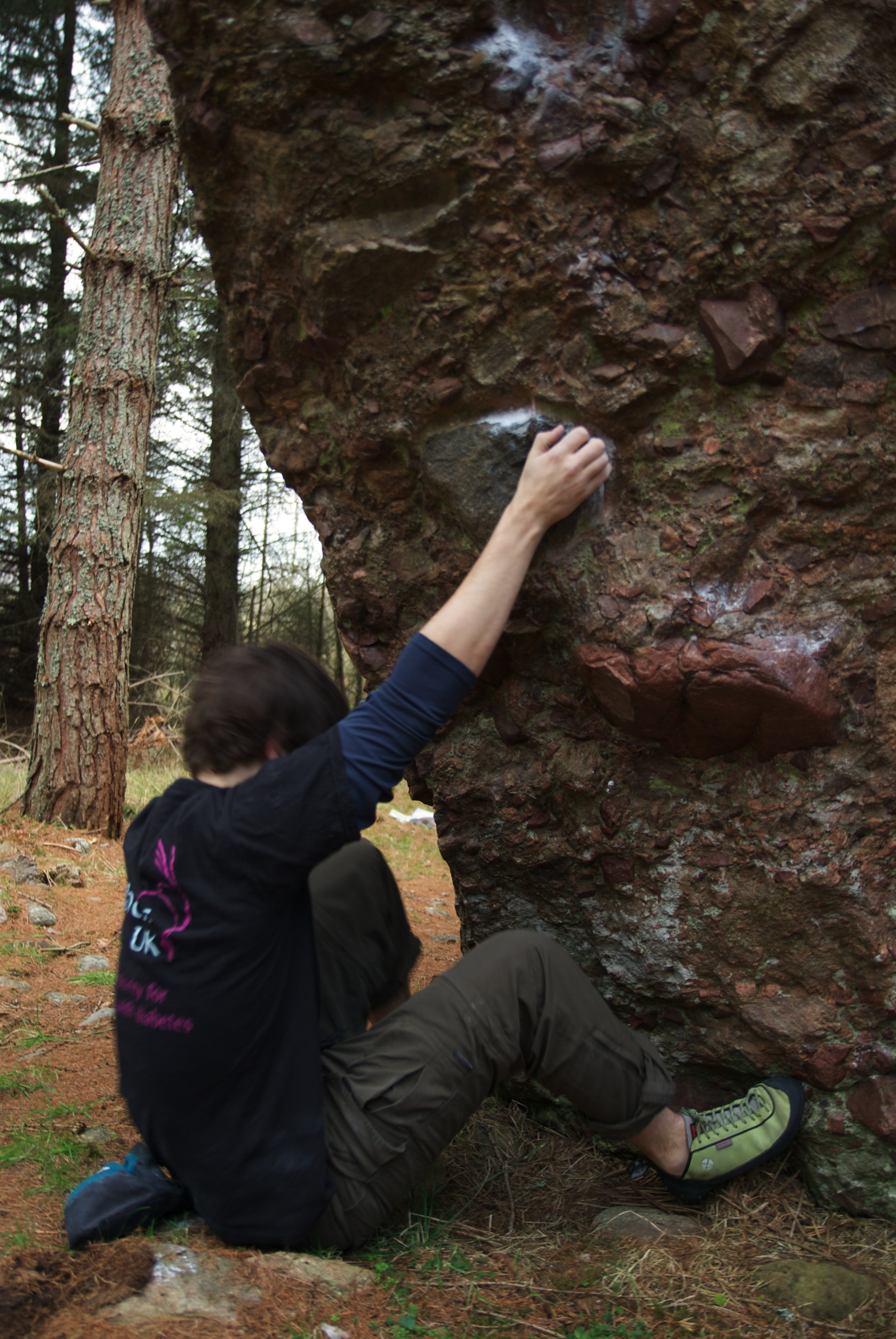
A sit start

Bouldering term for a route that must be started from a seated position on the ground with hands and feet on prescribed holds; acronyms are SS (sit-start), SDS (sit-down-start), or assis (french); concept invented by John Yablonski.
skyhook

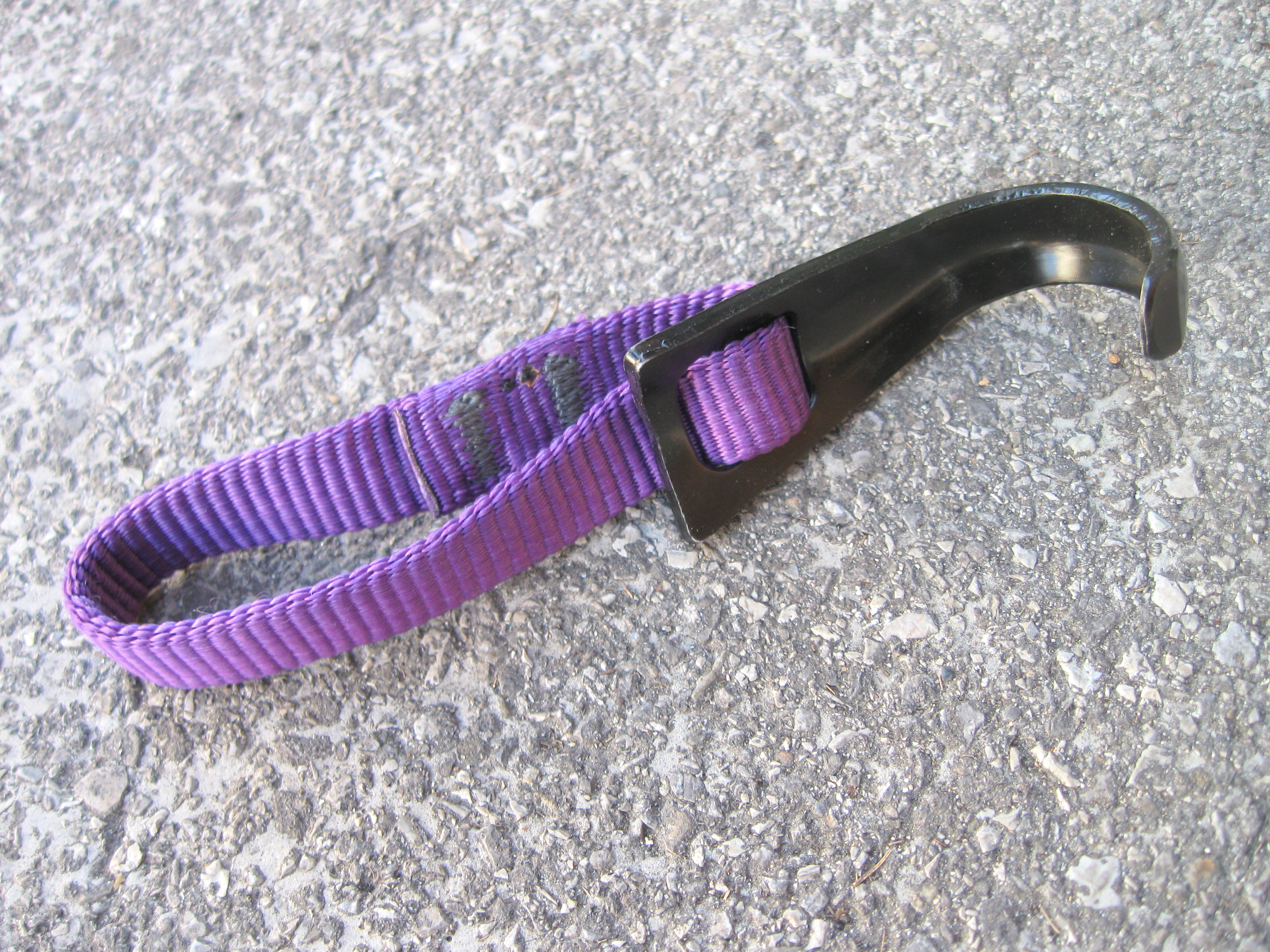
Skyhook

A metal hook inserted on a horizontal hold for protection in traditional climbing, or in aid climbing.
slab
A low-angle — significantly less than vertical — rock face that requires slab climbing techniques.
slab climbing
A type of climbing on slabs that usually emphasizes balance, footwork, and smearing.
slack
In lead climbing and in top rope climbing, it is the amount of additional rope that the belayer has allowed; slack increases the distance of any fall before the protection begins to hold the rope, but is needed to reduce rope drag or aid.
sling
A closed loop of webbing.
sloper

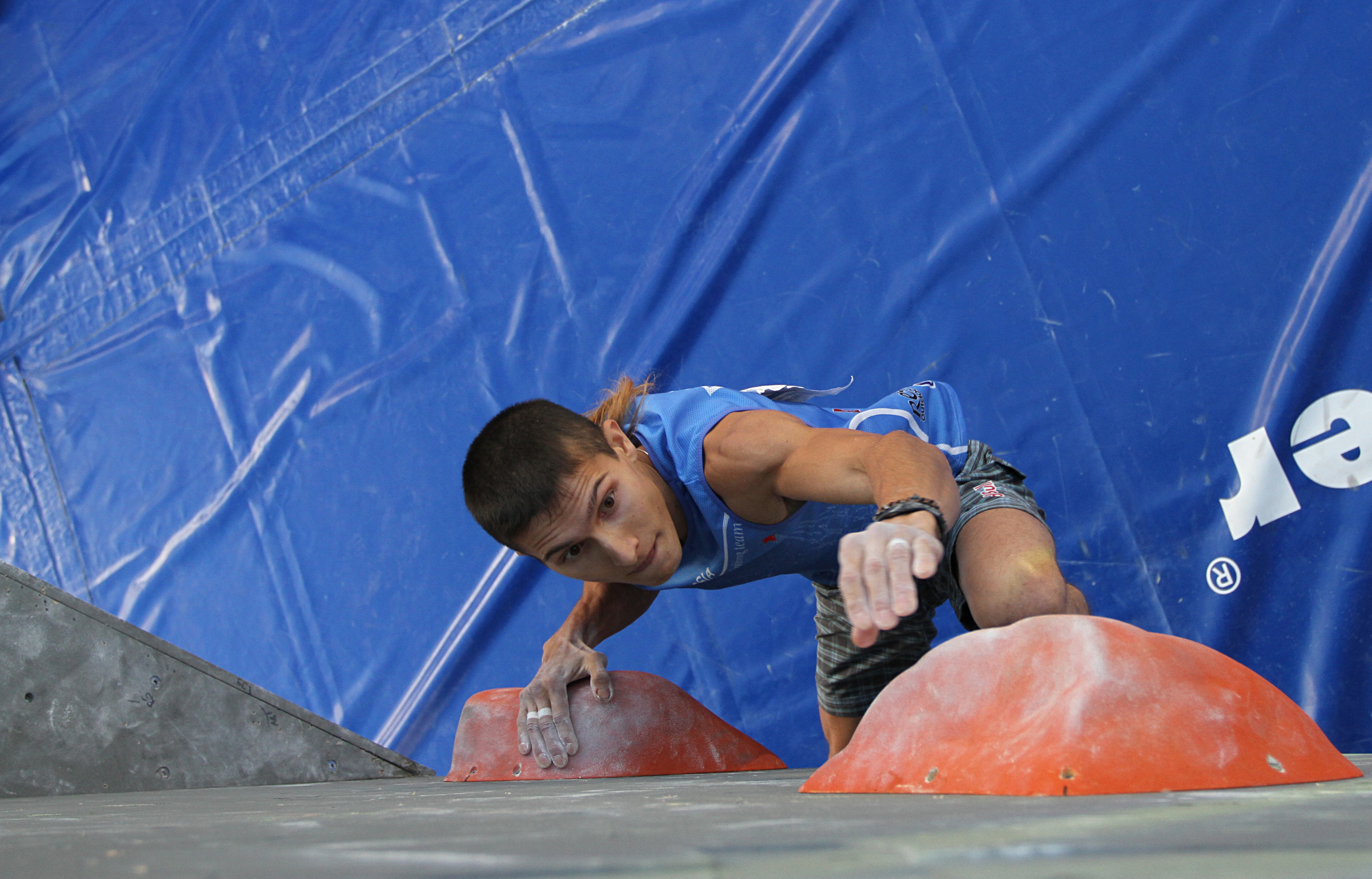
Sloper hold

A hold where the surface slopes down toward the ground, with very little positive surface or lip.
smearing
To make use of friction on the sole of the climbing shoe in the absence of good footholds.
snarg
A type of tubular ice screw that is inserted by hammering with an ice hammer.
snow cave
A temporary shelter constructed by digging out snow to form a cave.
snow fluke

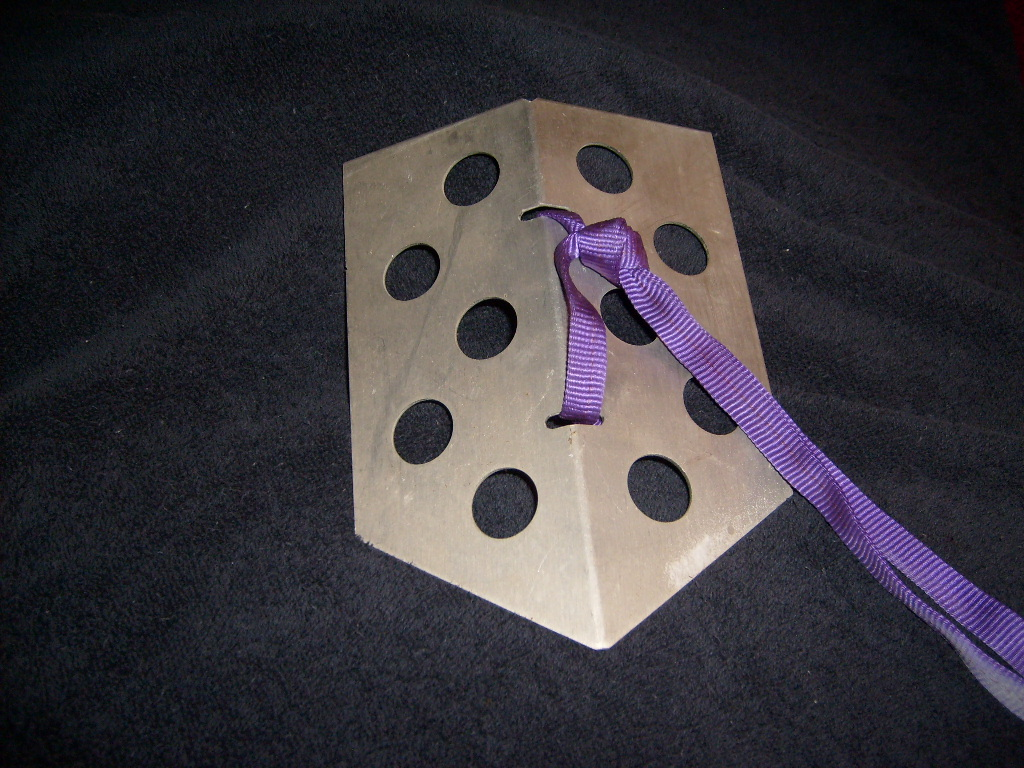
Snow fluke

An angled aluminum plate attached to a cable or rope that is buried into the snow to create a deadman anchor.
solo climbing
When the climber is alone (with no second); if also without protection is free solo climbing. See rope solo climbing.
speed climbing
A competition climbing discipline where competitors race in pairs up a standardized climbing wall.
spinner
In indoor climbing, a hold that is not secure and spins in place when weight is applied.
splitter

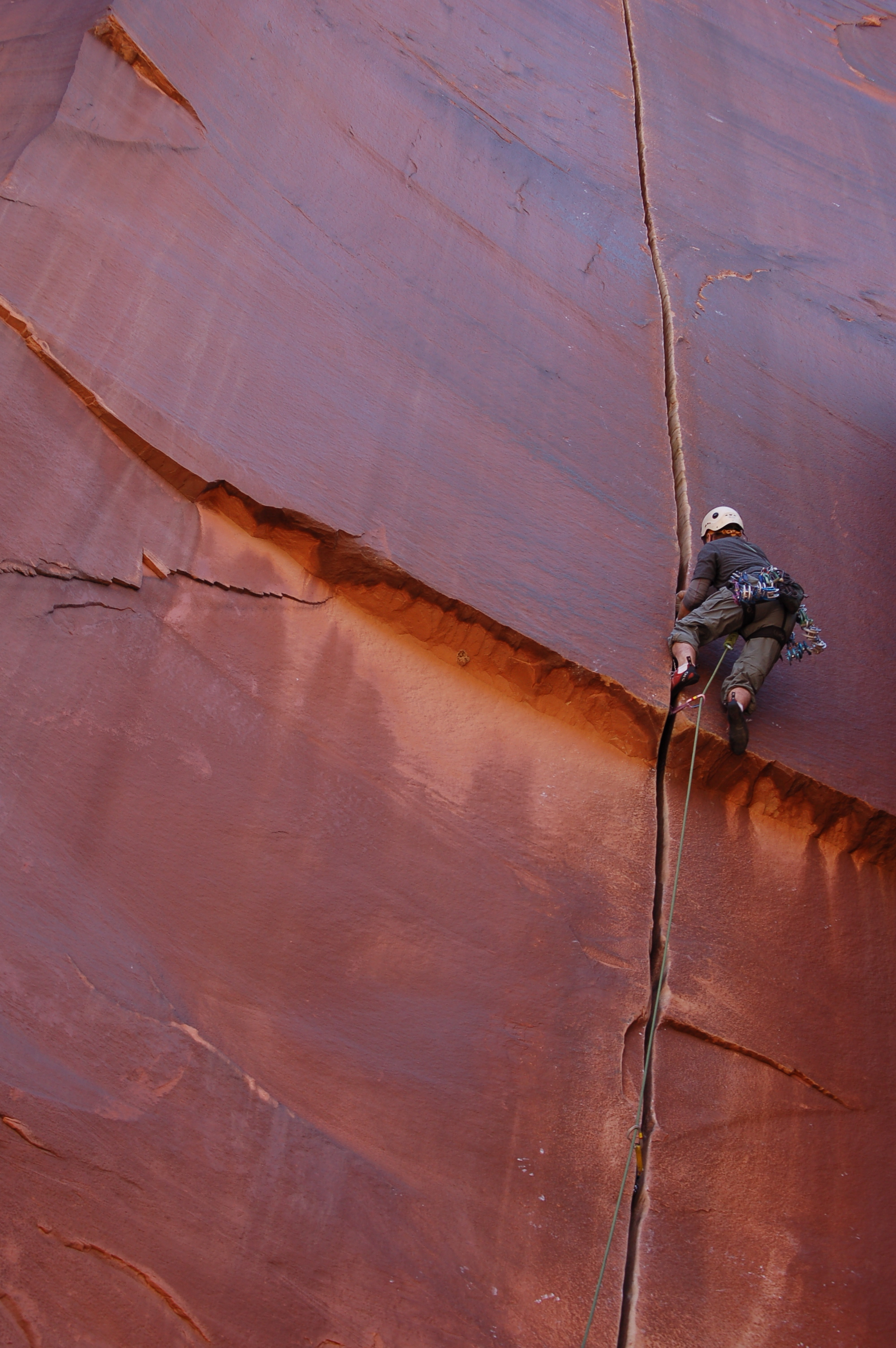
A splitter crack

A crack with perfectly parallel sides, often in an otherwise blank face.
sport climbing
A style of lead climbing where the protection is via pre-placed fixed bolts; opposite of traditional climbing. Confusingly, competition climbing (which includes bolted lead climbing, but also free solo bouldering and top-roped speed climbing) is sometimes called "sport climbing".
spotting
People standing beneath a lead climber or bouldering climber ready to absorb the energy of a ground fall.
sprag
A type of hand position where the fingers and thumb are opposed in a tiny crack.
spring-loaded camming device

A type of active protection device used in crack climbing. See cam.
static rope
A non-elastic climbing rope used for abseiling or jumaring (as a fixed rope), but not lead climbing. Compare dynamic rope.
stein pull
A technique in mixed climbing and dry-tooling where the ice axe is inverted and the blade wedged into a crack above the climber's head, who then pulls down on the handle of the axe to gain upward momentum. See also undercling pull.
stemming

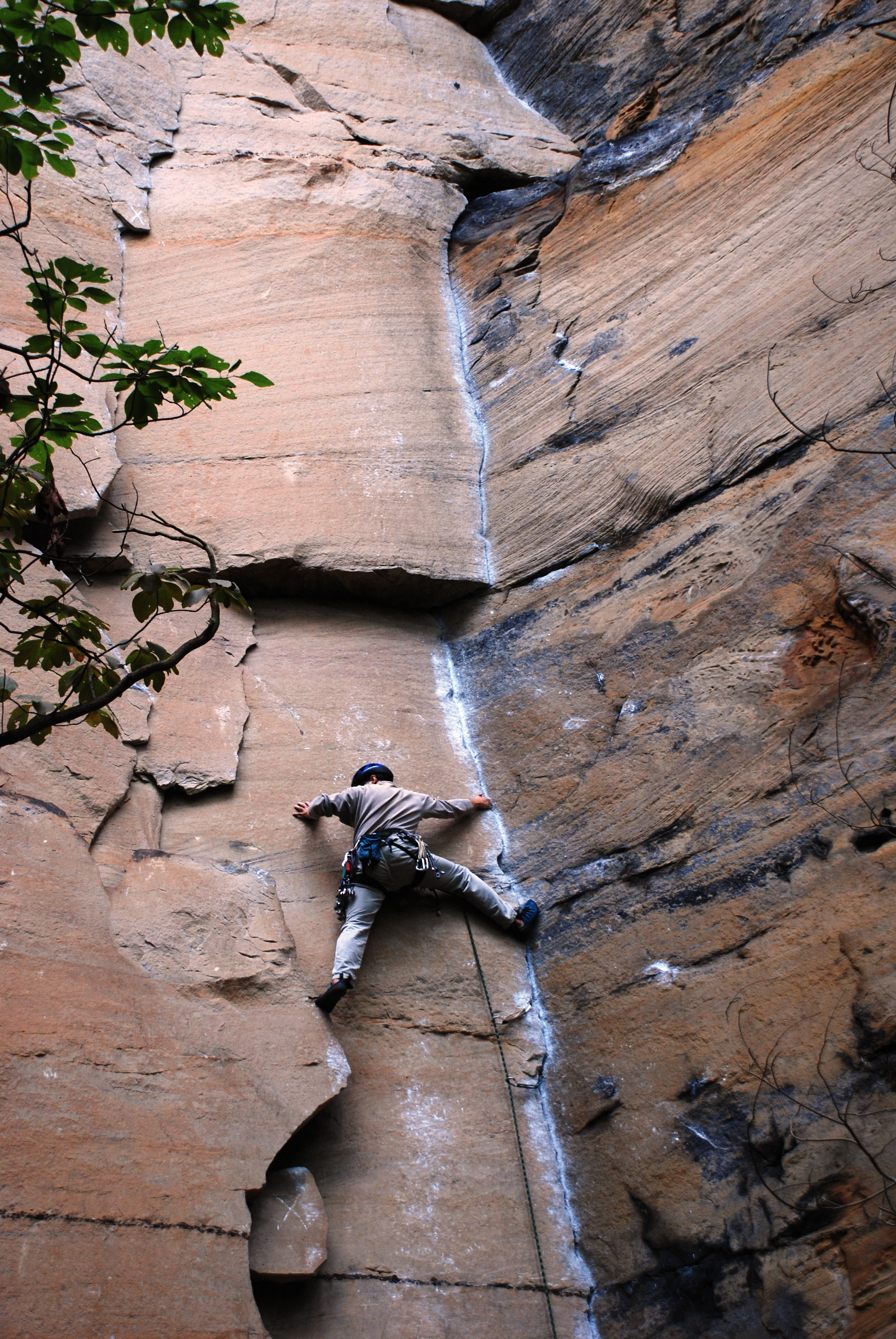
Stemming

Technique for climbing opposing corners by pushing in opposite directions with the feet and hands. See chimneying.
step cutting
Scooping steps out of snow or ice with the adze of an ice axe.
step kicking
Scooping and stamping steps out of soft snow with the feet.
Sticht plate
A belay device consisting of a flat plate with a pair of slots, named after the inventor Fritz Sticht. See also GiGi.
stick clip

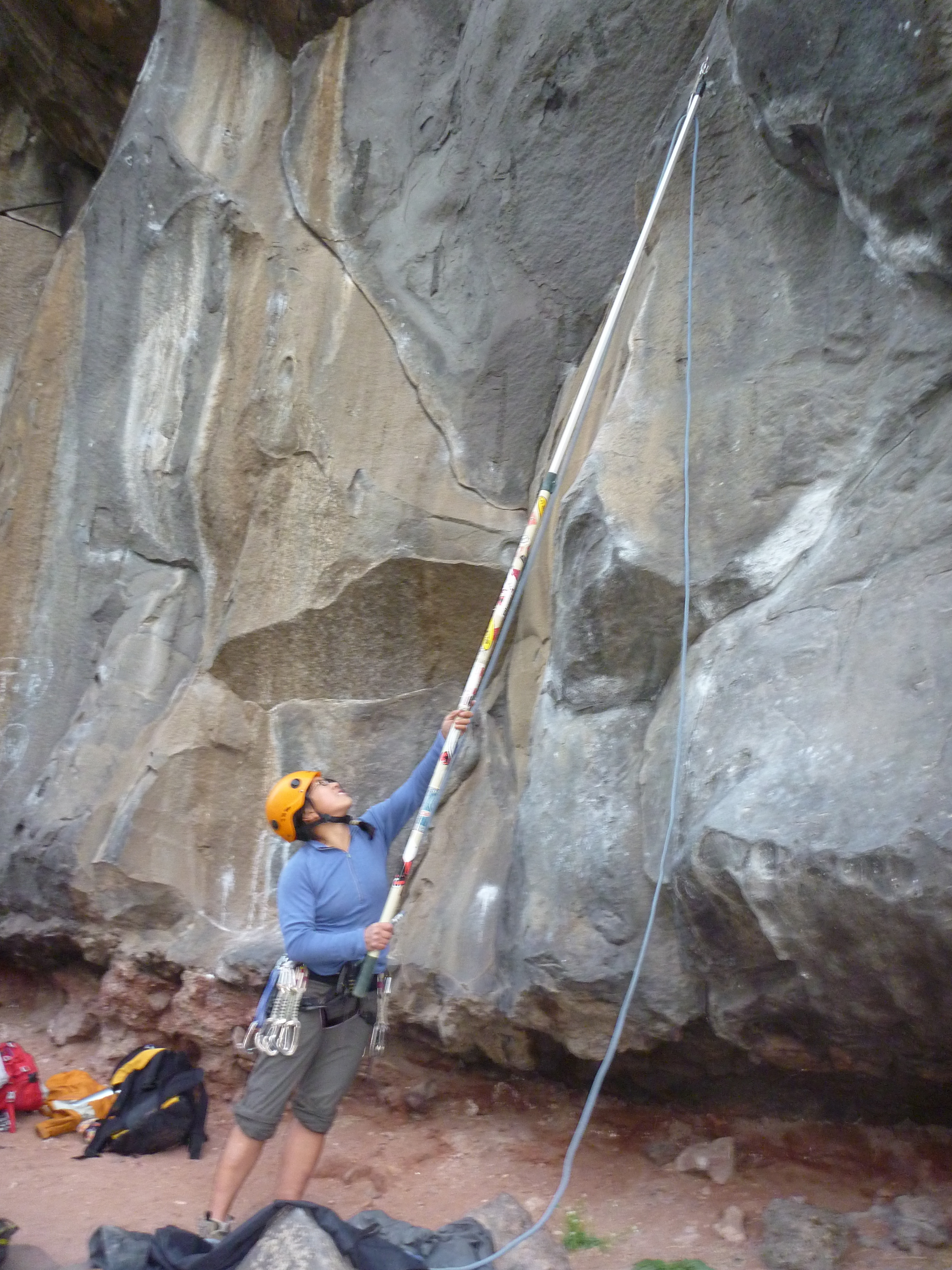
Using a stick clip

A long pole with a quickdraw that can be clipped into the first bolt of a route from the ground.
stopper
1. A wedge-shaped nut made by Black Diamond.
2. A knot used to prevent the end of a rope from running through—and detaching from—a piece of gear.
sure-footedness
Sure-footedness is the ability when hiking or mountain climbing, to negotiate difficult or rough terrain safely.
swami belt
A type of simple climbing harness

== T ==
tat
Term to describe pieces of webbing or cord left on a climb (e.g. "I found some old tat") often as part of an irretrievable anchor point that was part of an abseil station.
take

The act of taking the slack out of a rope; also a climbing command by a lead climber to the belayer.
talus

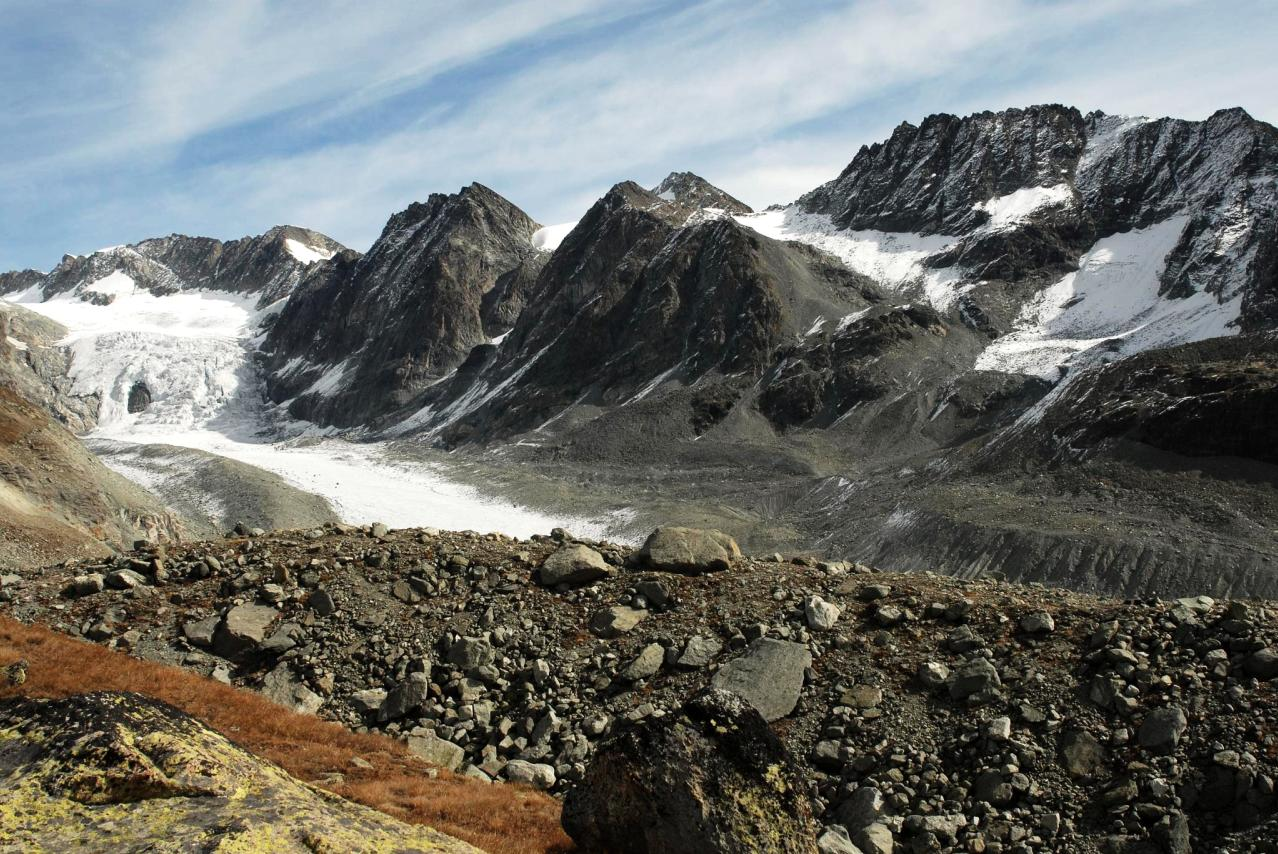
Talus rocks

An area of large rock fragments on a mountainside where the rocks are stable and not loose like scree.
talon hook
A type of three-pronged climbing hook used for securing the climber to a horizontal edge in the rock face. Each prong contains a curved hook of differing widths for securing onto respective edge sizes when aid climbing.
tape

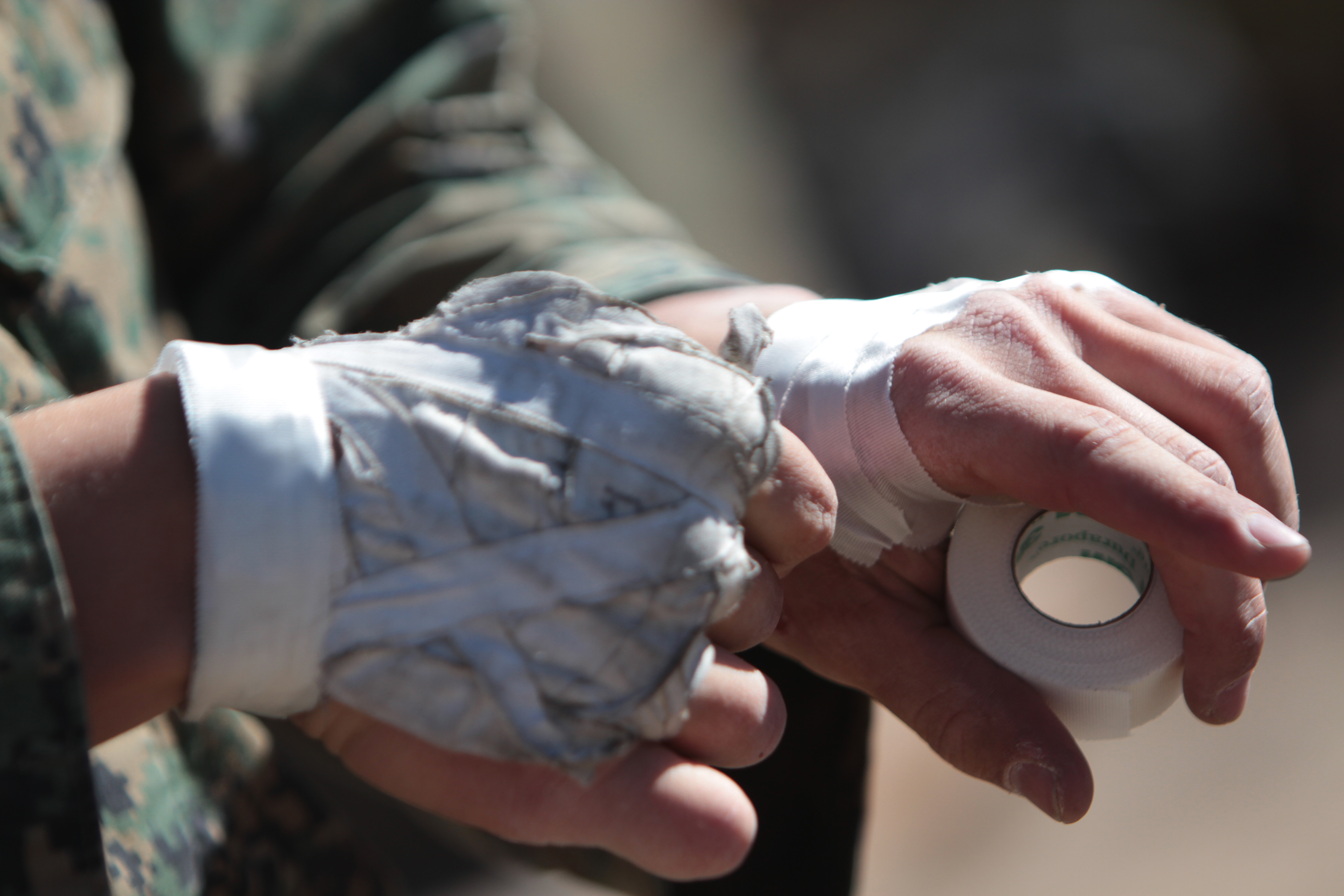
Applying tape

Adhesive tape that is wrapped around the fingers and hands to protect the skin; particularly useful in crack climbing.
technical grade
See grade.
testpiece
A route that is representative of the hardest climbs in an area at a particular grade (e.g. Action Directe for grade 9a).
tie in

To physically attach the harness to the climbing rope, usually via a figure-eight knot. See clip in.
thread
A runner created by "threading" a sling around a jammed block or through a hole in the rock.
toe hook

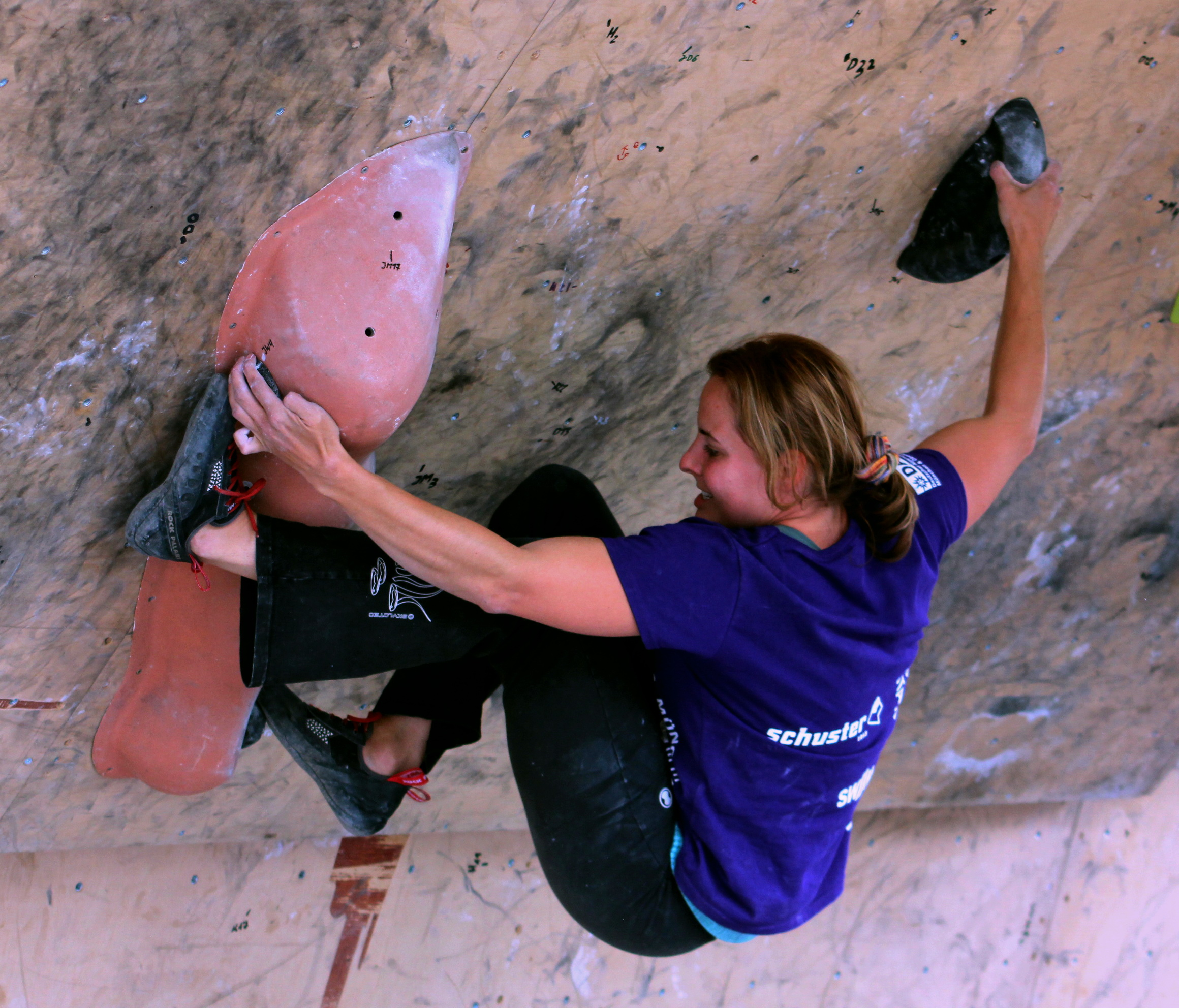
A toe hook

Act of pressing the upper side of the toes under a hold to pull the climber inwards; used on overhangs.
topo
The graphical representation – drawing or photograph – of a climbing route, with the main obstacles marked.
top rope climbing

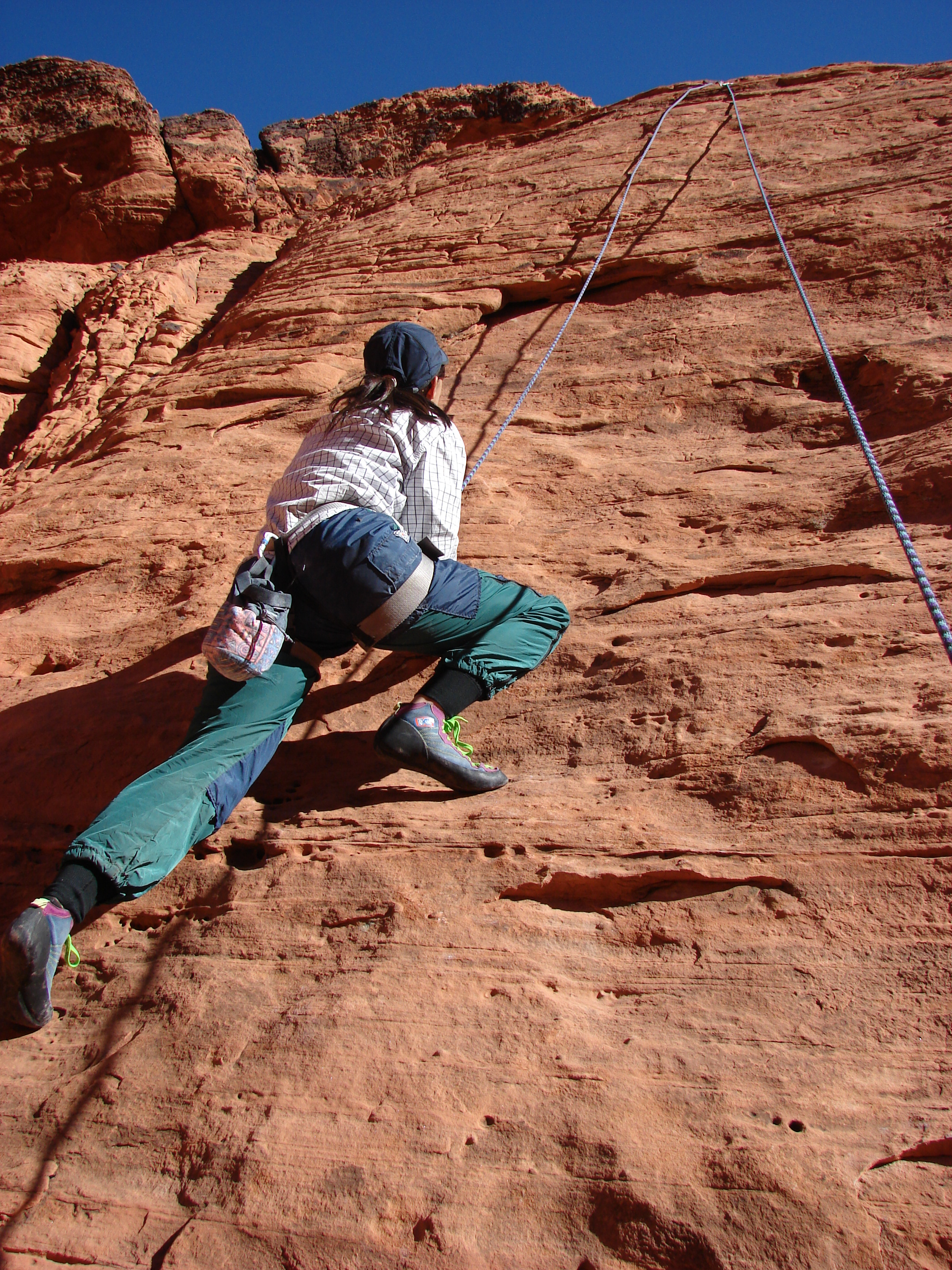
Top roping

To belay from a fixed anchor point above the climb; if the climber falls, they just hang. See hangdogging.
top-out
To complete a route by ascending over the top of the climb to safety.
torque pull
A technique in mixed climbing and dry-tooling where the ice axe is wedged into a crack and twisted to generate torque to aid upward momentum. See also undercling pull and stein pull.
tracking
See feet follow.
traditional climbing

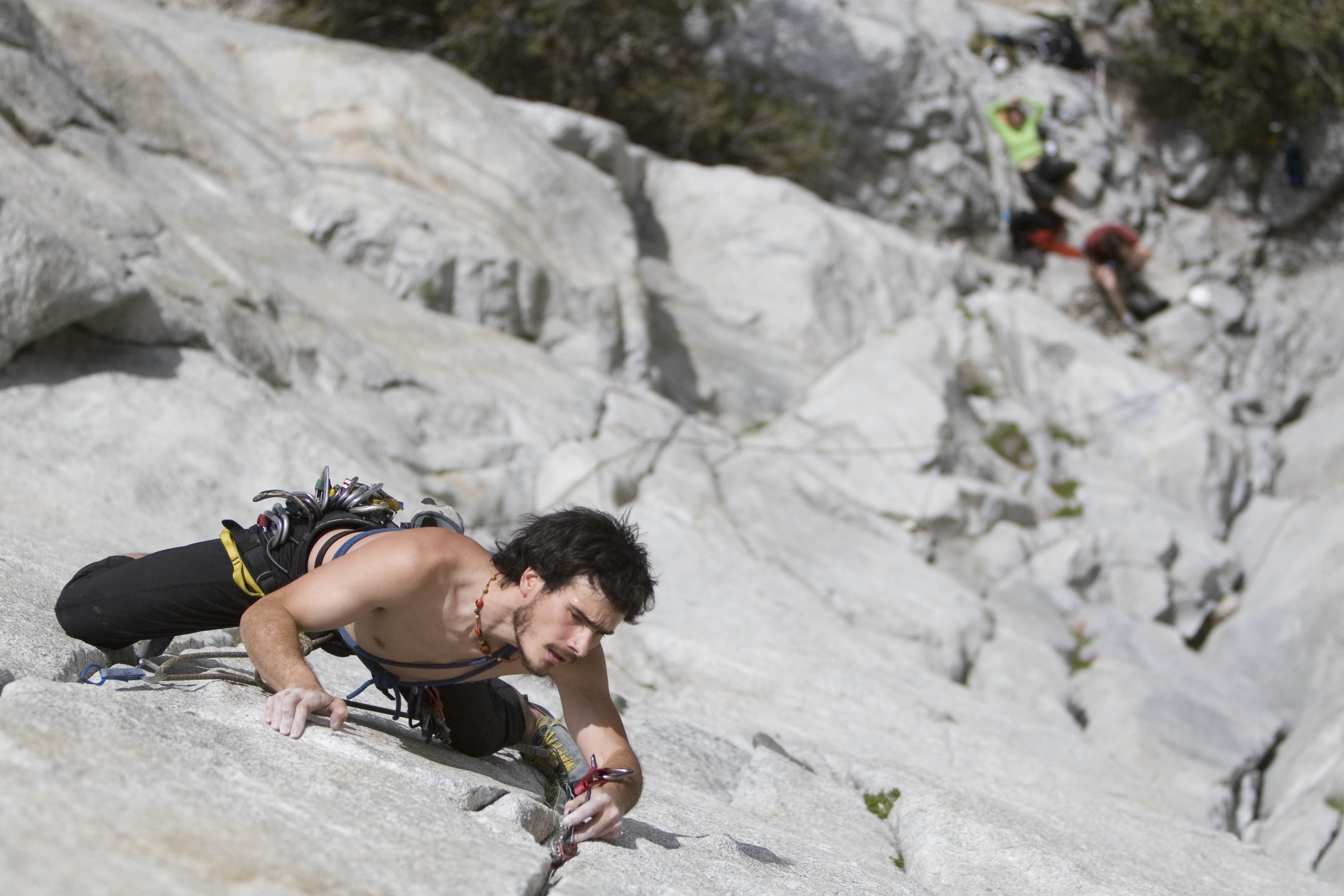
Traditional climbing

A style of lead climbing where protection is placed as the lead climber ascends; opposite of sport climbing.
trail rope

A big wall climbing technique where the lead climber carries an additional static rope (in addition to their dynamic climbing rope) that hangs (or "trails") behind them as they ascend; the trail rope enables the belayer to pass equipment to the leader during the ascent, and for the leader to haul up equipment as the belayer ascends.
traverse

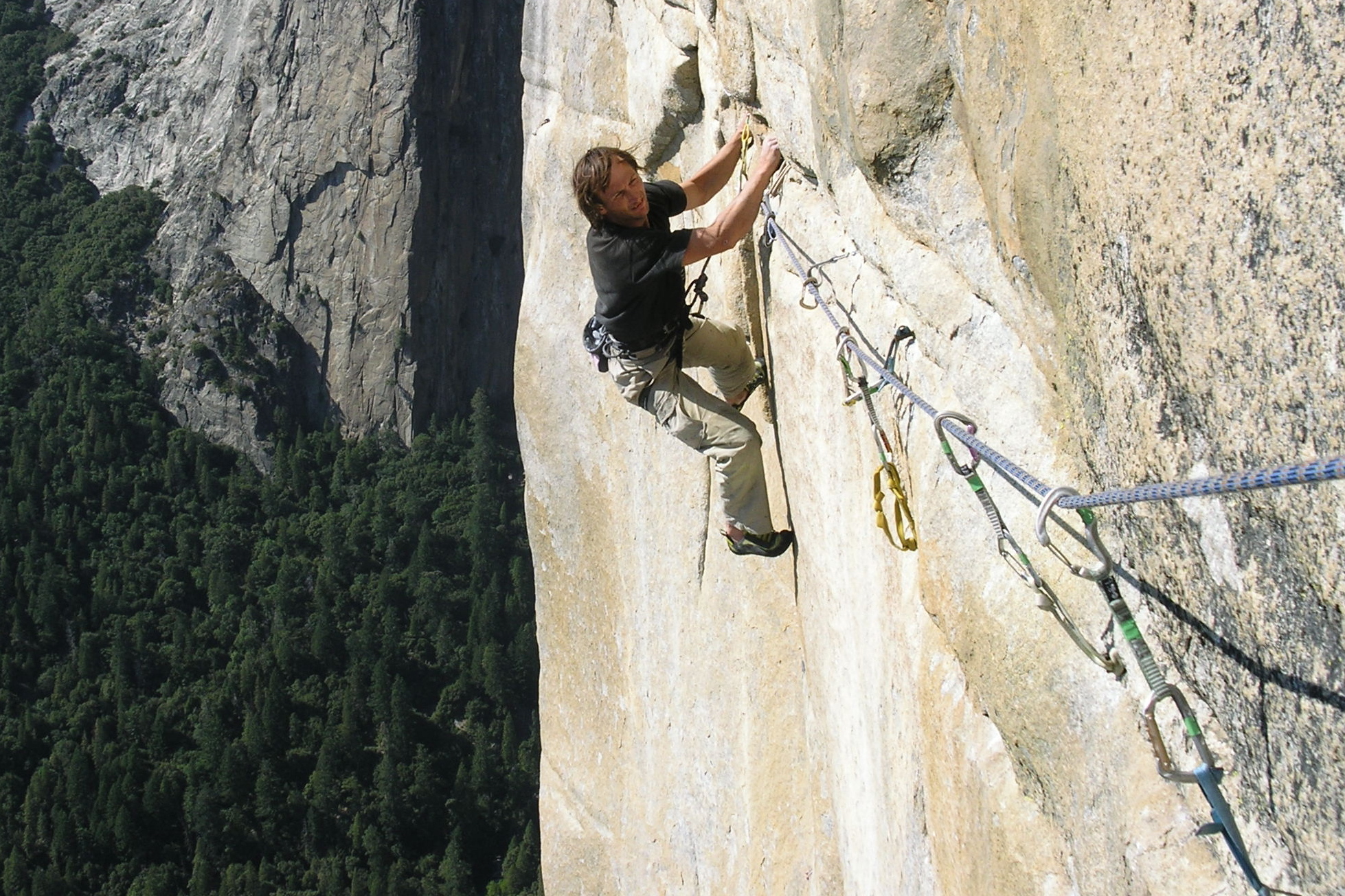
Traversing

1. A section of a route that requires progress in a horizontal direction.
2. A Tyrolean traverse is crossing a chasm using a fixed rope anchored at both ends.
3. A pendulum traverse is swinging across a wall suspended from a rope anchored above the climber.
4. A tension traverse is a static version of a pendulum traverse where rope tension is used to control movement.
tricam

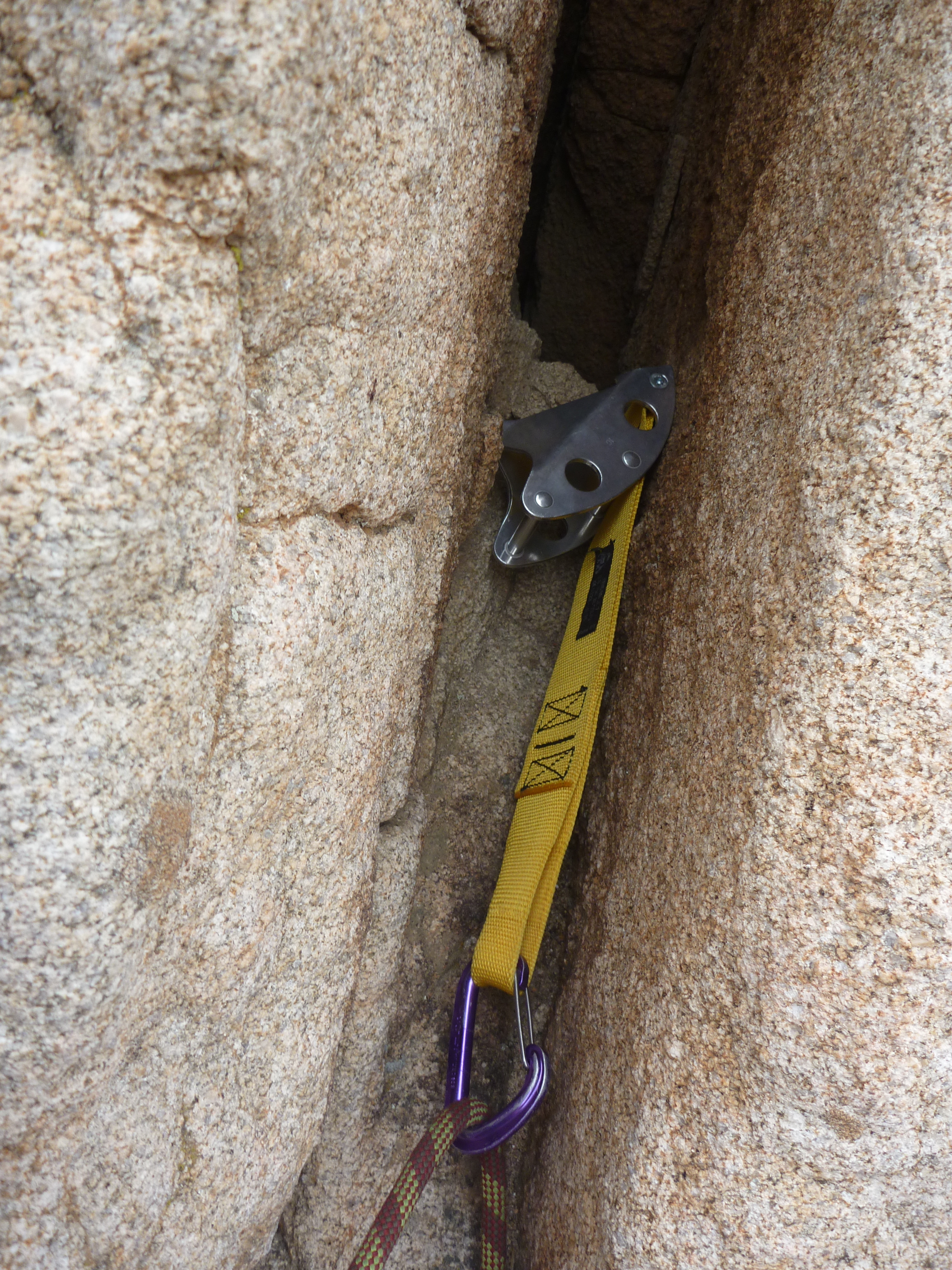
Tricam

A simple camming protection device that has no moving parts (e.g. it is passive protection).
tuber

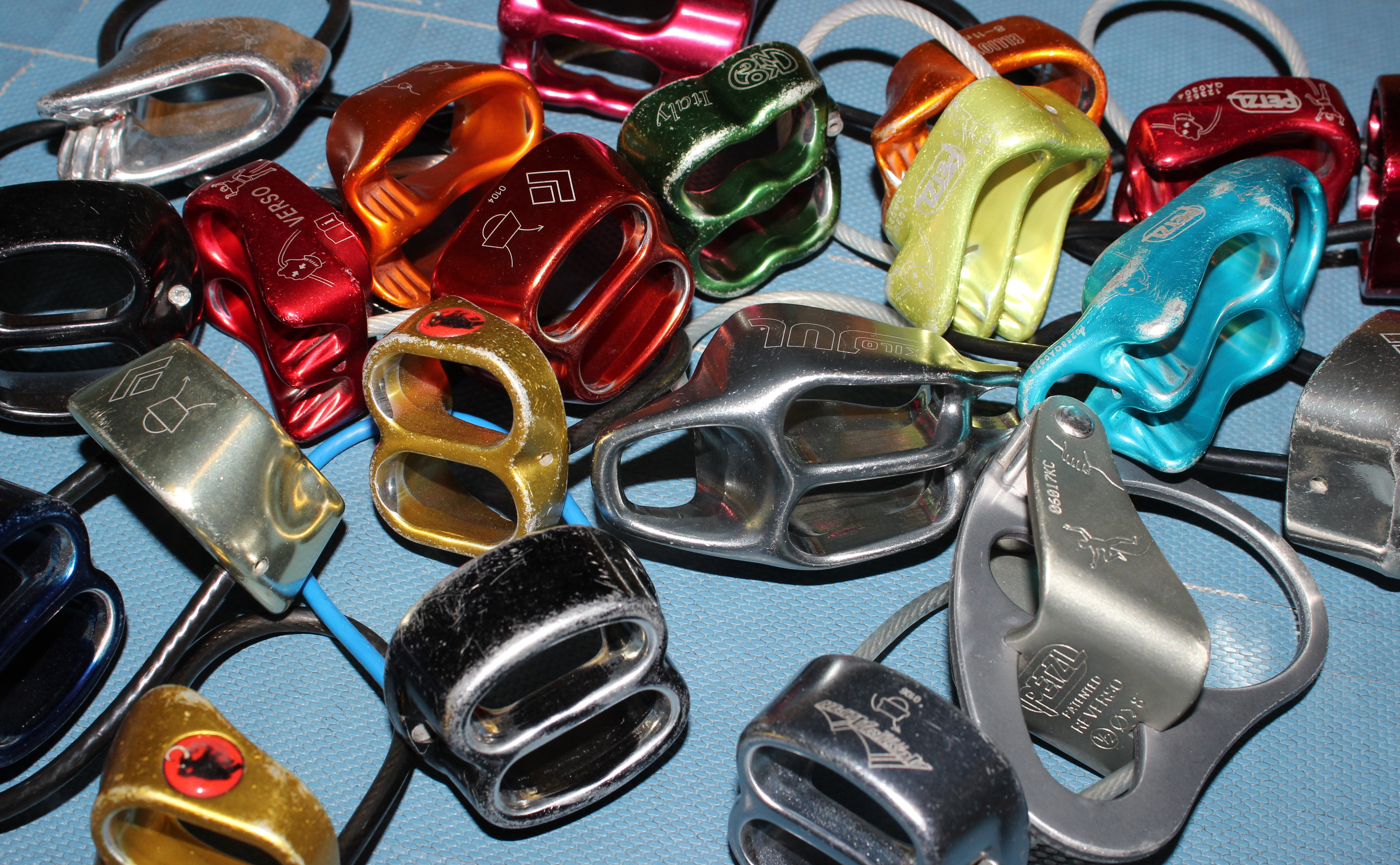
Tubers

A type of belay device.
tufa

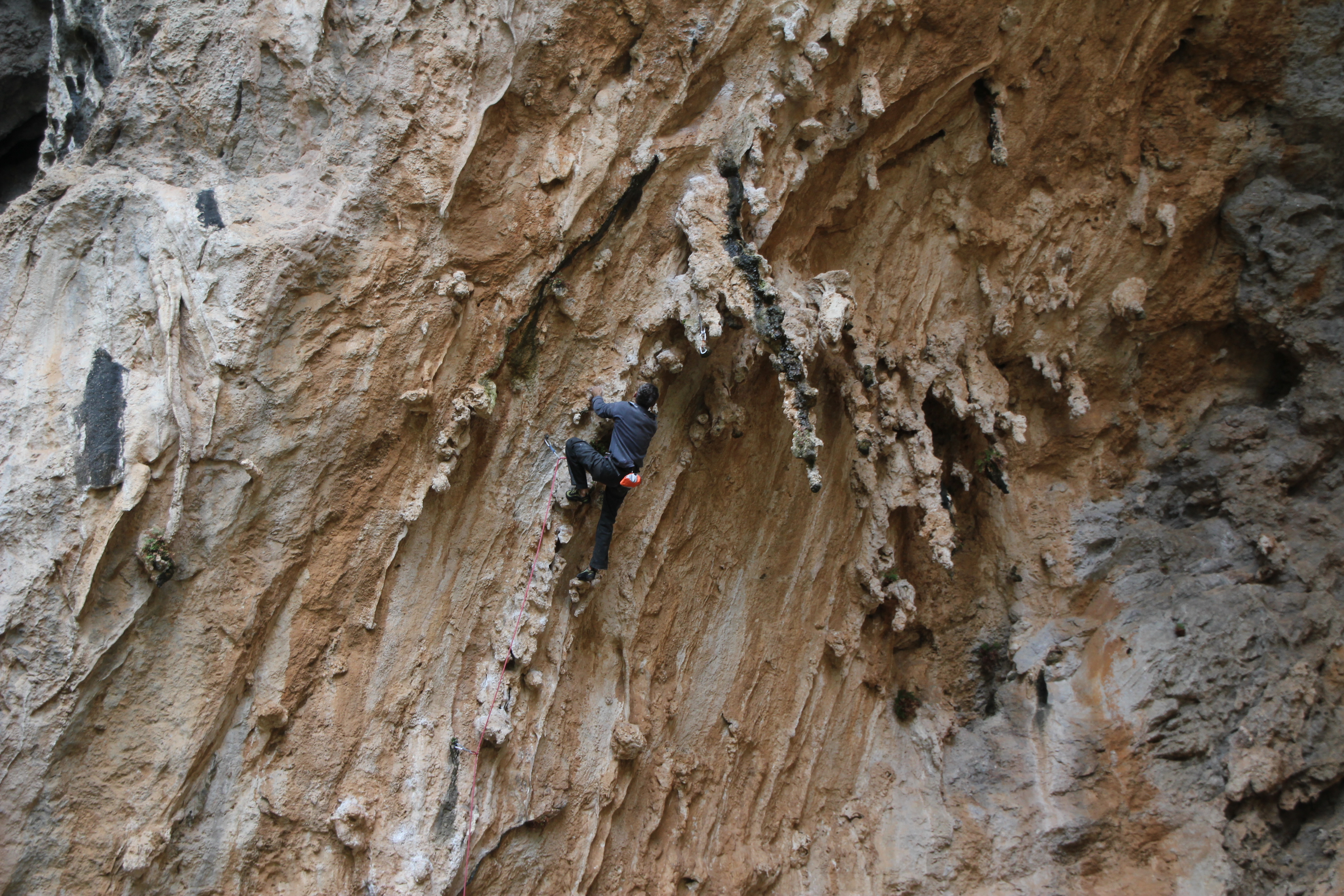
Climbing on tufas

1. A limestone rib formation that protrudes from the wall which climbers can pinch-grip.
2. A plastic bolted-on bouldering hold to replicate such a formation on a climbing wall.
twin ropes
In lead climbing, using two ropes that are even thinner than double ropes, both of which need to be clipped in at each point of protection; sometimes used in long alpine climbing routes with major abseiling descents.
twist lock
A climbing move where the hips "twist" perpendicular to the wall, the inside arm is "locked" on an upper hold, the outside arm holds the body against the wall, and the feet press down to propel the body higher.

== U ==
UIAA
Acronym for the international governance body for mountaineering and other types of climbing; UIAA also regulates competition ice climbing. See also IFSC.
UIAA grade

The UIAA grade system for rock climbing, which goes: ... VI, VII, VIII, IX, X, XI, .... , to XII; is less common than the French grade system or the American YDS grade system, but still used in Germany and parts of Eastern Europe.
UIAA Scale of Overall Difficulty
See Alpine-grade.
undercling

A downward hold which is gripped with the palm of the hand facing upwards.
undercling pull
After a stein pull is completed, the undercling pull is a mixed climbing technique for continuing to use the hold to gain upward momentum by using the hold to pull into the rock; requires a lot more energy than a stein pull.
undercut
See undercling.

== V ==
V-grade

A grading system for bouldering problems invented by John Sherman, which goes: V0, V1, V2, V3, V4, V5, V6, V7, ... , to V17. The V-scale and the French font scale are the most common boulder grading systems in use worldwide.
V-thread

A type of abseiling point used especially in winter and in ice climbing.
verglas
A thin coating of ice that forms over rocks when rainfall or melting snow freezes, which is hard to climb on as there is insufficient depth for crampons to have penetration. See also clear ice and glaze ice.
via ferrata

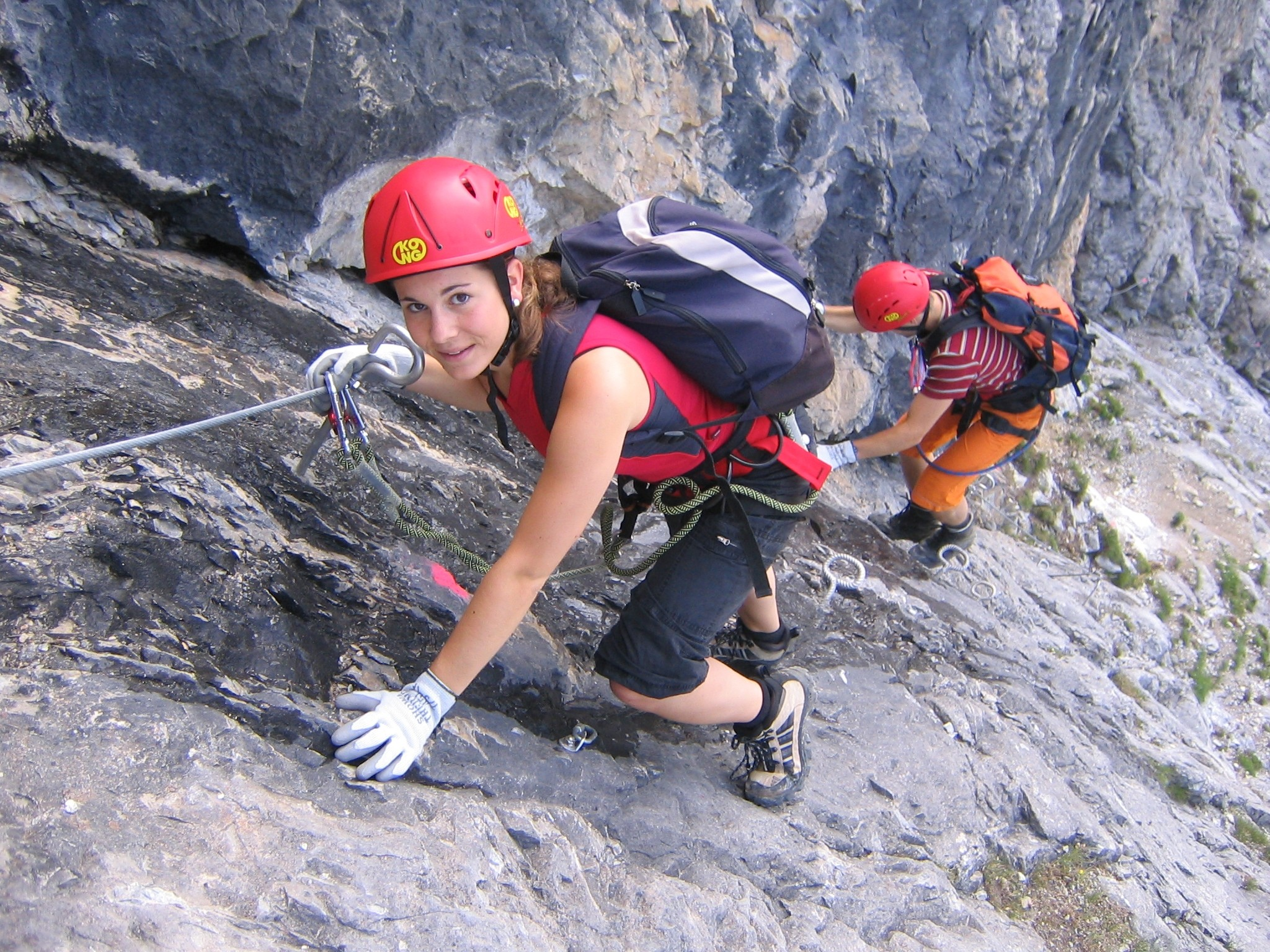
Climbing a via ferrata

An alpine route where protection is from permanent steel fixed ropes or chains, with progression aided by artificial steel steps or ladders; commonly found in the Dolomites. See also lanyard and energy absorber.
volume hold

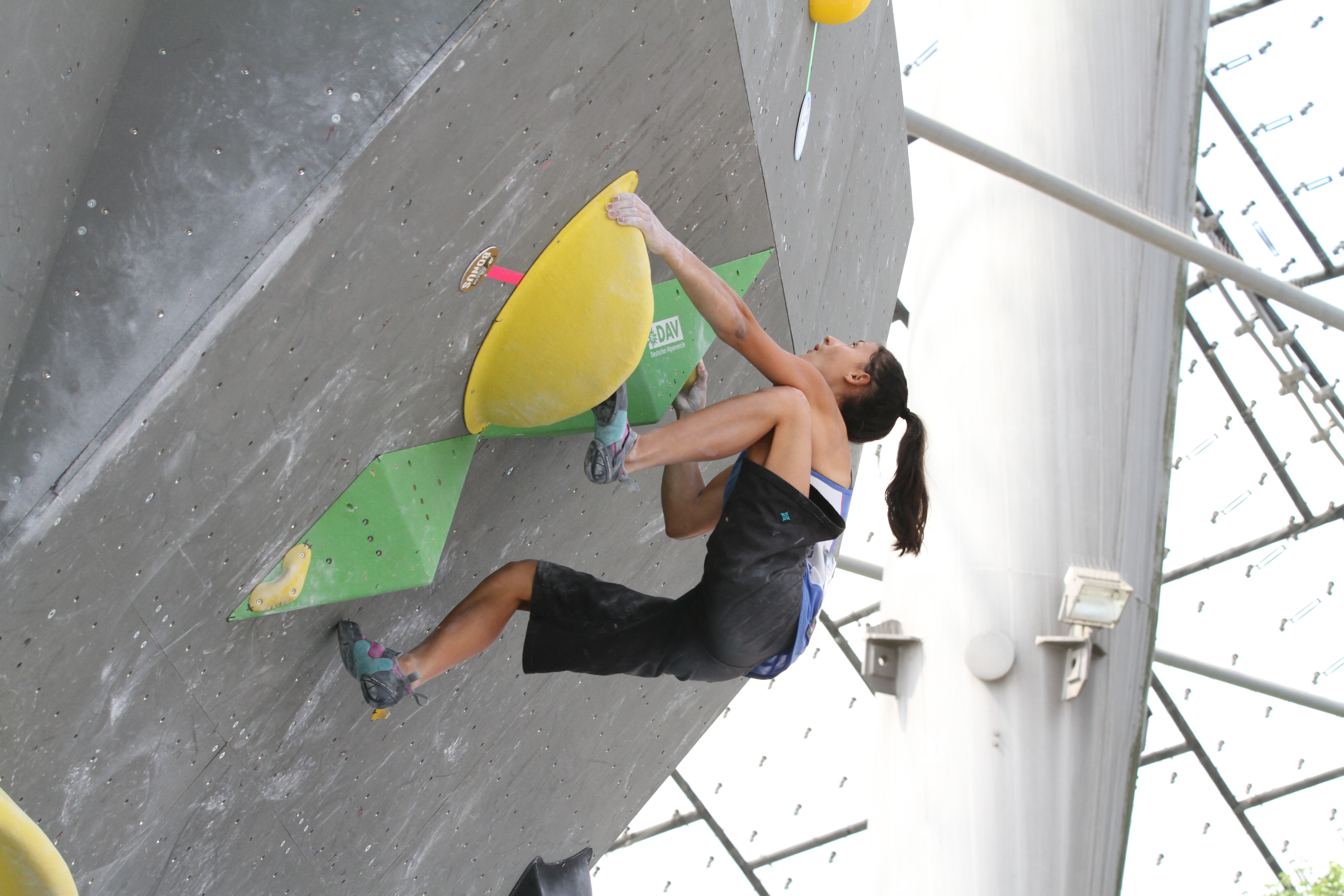
Volume holds

A large, hollow, bolted-on hold, for indoor climbing walls; it may itself contain individual holds

== W ==
WI-grade

Part of the ice climbing system for grading the technical difficulty of ice climbing routes, which goes: WI1, WI2, WI3, WI4, WI5, WI6, and up to WI13. See also M-grade.
webbing

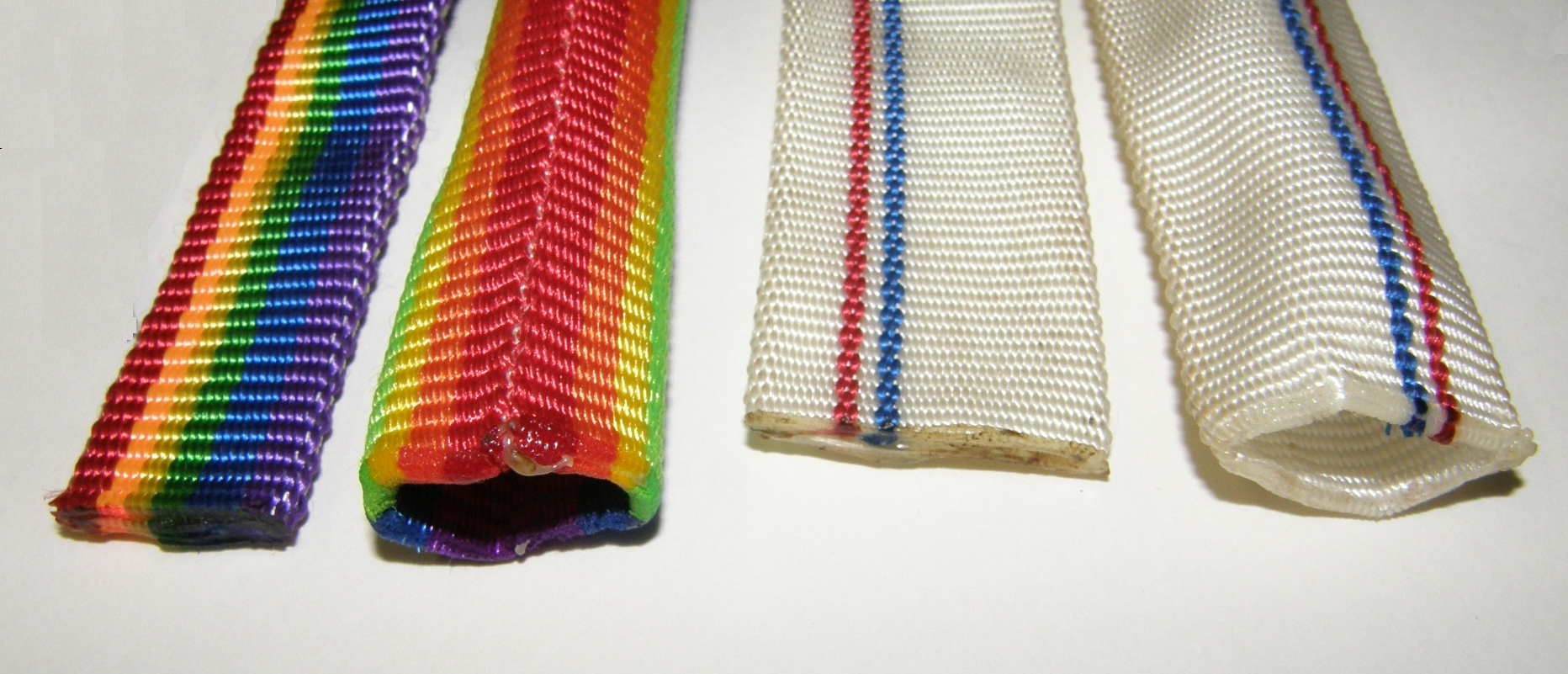
Round webbing

A hollow and flat nylon strip mainly used to make slings.
webolette
A piece of webbing with eyes sewn into the ends which can be used in place of a cordelette.
weighting
Any time a rope sustains the weight of the climber, e.g. "weighting the rope". This can happen during a minor fall, a whipper (long fall), or simply by resting while hanging on the belay rope. See also hangdogging.
whipper

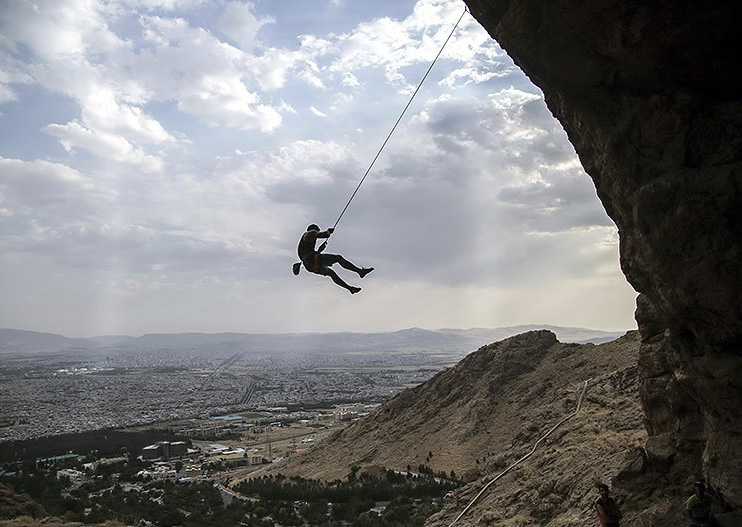
Climber on a whipper

A large fall by a lead climber as they were well beyond the last piece of protection. See screamer.
wire brushing
Cleaning a rock climbing route with a wire brush before an attempt; has ethical issues due to rock damage and possible chipping.
wired
See dialled.
wires
See nuts.
WC
Acronym for the international body that organises and regulates competition climbing. See UIAA.

== X ==
X
A suffix used in the Yosemite decimal system for highlighting traditional climbing routes that have poor or even no possibilities for protection, where any fall could be fatal (e.g. Indian Face and Gaia). See R/X and chop route.

== Y ==
yaniro
French term for a figure-four move which came from American climber Tony Yaniro's use of it on Chouca 8a+ (5.13c).
yo-yo
A free climbing term pre-redpointing, where a falling lead climber returns to the ground to restart, but leaves their rope clipped into the protection — in redpointing, the rope is pulled free from all protection before re-starting the climb.
Yosemite Decimal System
American system for grading walks, hikes, and climbs; the rock climbing (5.x) goes: 5.7, 5.8, 5.9, 5.10a, 5.10b, 5.10c, 5.10d, 5.11a, .... , 5.14a, 5.14b, 5.14c, 5.14d, 5.15a, etc., and with the French grade system, is the most widely used grading system worldwide for sport climbing.

== Z ==
z-clipping
While lead climbing, clipping into protection with a segment of rope from beneath the previous piece of protection, resulting in rope drag.
z-pulley

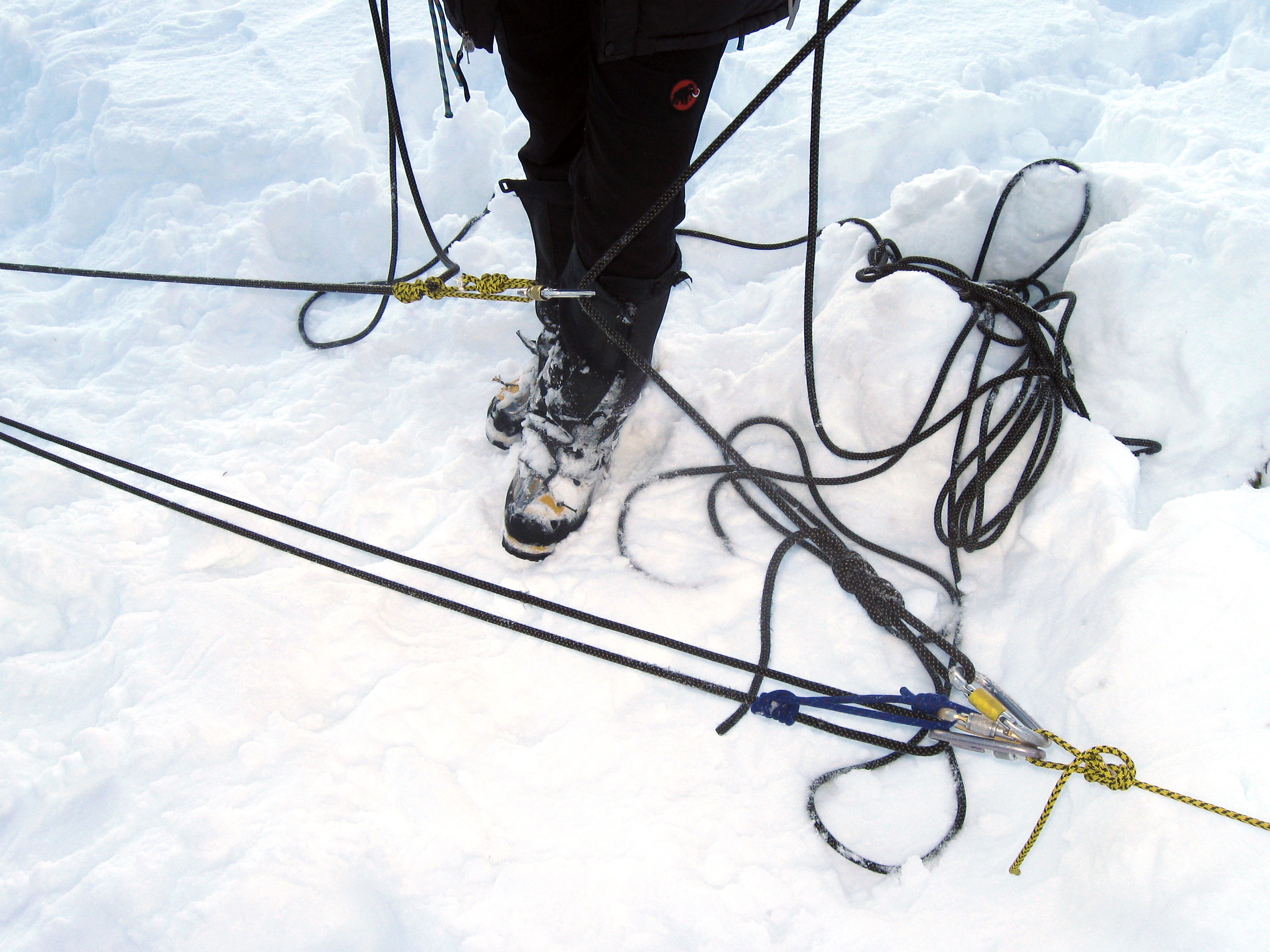
Z-pulley system

A system of rope, anchors, and pulleys; is typically used to extricate a climber after falling into a crevasse.
zawn

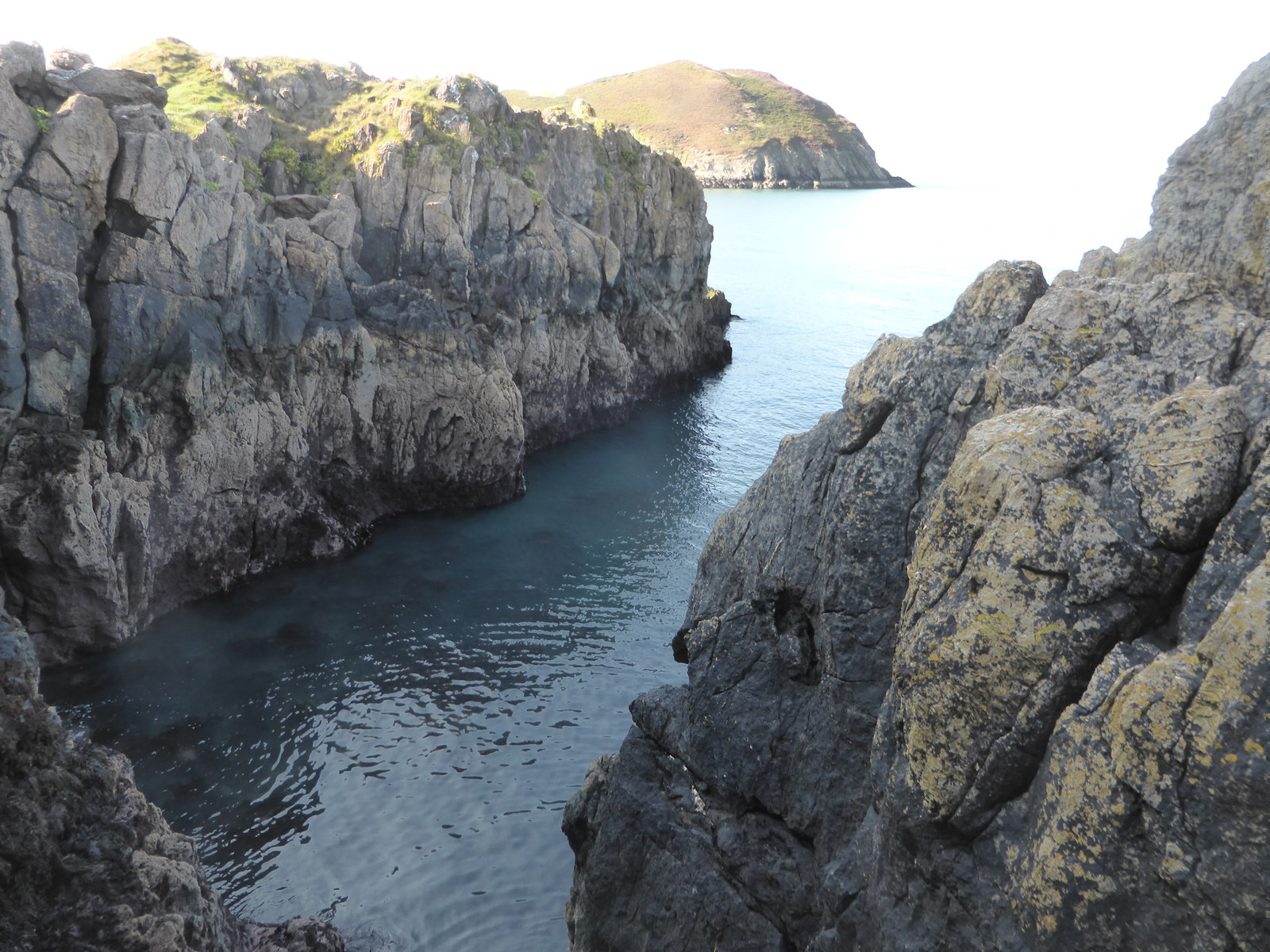
A zawn in Wales

In Britain, a deep, narrow inlet in a sea cliff that is filled by the sea at high tide.
zipper fall

A traditional climbing ground fall where all the protection gear fails in sequence (i.e. opens like a "zip").
zone hold

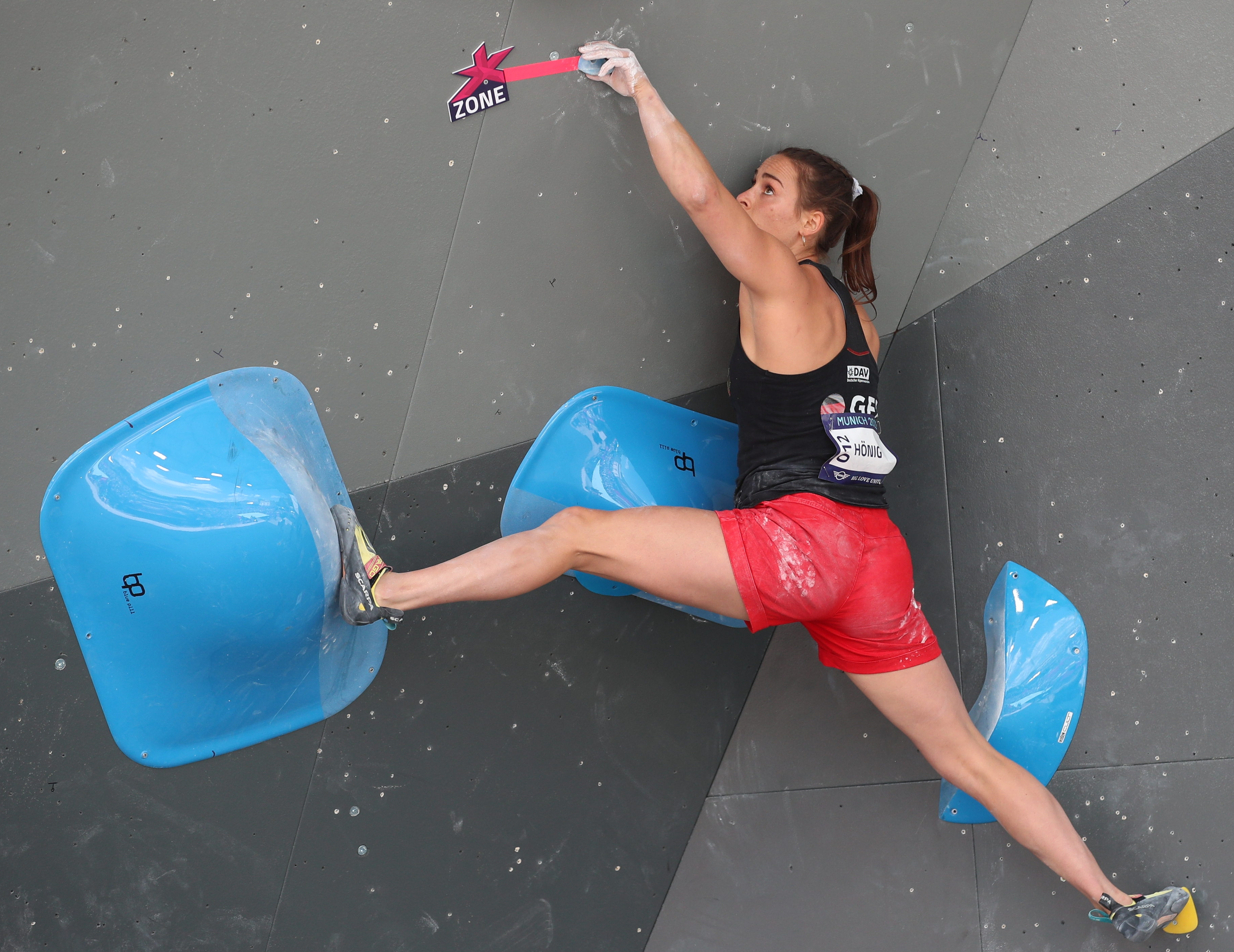
Zone hold

In competition bouldering, a hold roughly halfway up that counts towards scoring; formerly (up to 2017) "bonus hold".

== See also ==
- Climbing equipment
- Glossary of caving and speleology
- List of climbers and mountaineers
- Mountaineering: The Freedom of the Hills
